= List of countries by guns and homicide =

Multiple studies show that where people have easy access to firearms, gun-related deaths tend to be more frequent, including by suicide, homicide, and unintentional injuries.

Created by combining List of countries by intentional homicide rate, Estimated number of civilian guns per capita by country and List of countries by firearm-related death rate as of. Check the respective articles for source information and caveats regarding the quality of the data.

Note: Asterisk (*) after location is for "Crime in LOCATION" links.

Homicide rate. Firearm ownership. Death rate from firearms (all causes).
Location	Region	Subregion	Intentional homicide victims per 100,000 inhabitants	Estimate of civilian firearms per 100 persons	Total firearm-related death rate per 100,000 inhabitants
Afghanistan *	Asia	Southern Asia	6.7	12.5	?
Albania *	Europe	Southern Europe	2.1	12	?
Algeria	Africa	Northern Africa	1.3	2.1	?
American Samoa	Oceania	Polynesia	?	0.7	?
Andorra	Europe	Southern Europe	2.6	14.1	?
Angola	Africa	Middle Africa	4.8	11.2	?
Anguilla	Americas	Caribbean	28.3	?	?
Antigua and Barbuda *	Americas	Caribbean	9.2	5.4	?
Argentina *	Americas	South America	5.3	7.4	5.72
Armenia *	Asia	Western Asia	1.8	6.1	?
Aruba	Americas	Caribbean	1.9	2.6	?
Australia *	Oceania	Australia, New Zealand	0.9	14.5	0.88
Austria *	Europe	Western Europe	0.7	30	2.75
Azerbaijan *	Asia	Western Asia	2.3	3.6	0.23
Bahamas	Americas	Caribbean	18.6	18.8	?
Bahrain *	Asia	Western Asia	0.1	12.8	?
Bangladesh *	Asia	Southern Asia	2.4	0.4	?
Barbados	Americas	Caribbean	14.3	3.5	7.36
Belarus *	Europe	Eastern Europe	2.4	6.1	?
Belgium *	Europe	Western Europe	1.7	12.7	1.4
Belize *	Americas	Central America	25.7	10	?
Benin *	Africa	Western Africa	1.1	0.3	?
Bermuda	Americas	Northern America	0	4.6	?
Bhutan *	Asia	Southern Asia	2.5	0.8	?
Bolivia *	Americas	South America	7	2	?
Bosnia and Herzegovina	Europe	Southern Europe	1.3	31.2	?
Botswana	Africa	Southern Africa	15.2	4.1	?
Brazil *	Americas	South America	22.5	8.3	23.93
British Virgin Islands	Americas	Caribbean	8.3	0.8	?
Brunei	Asia	South-Eastern Asia	0.5	1.4	?
Bulgaria *	Europe	Eastern Europe	1	8.4	1.51
Burkina Faso	Africa	Western Africa	1.3	0.9	?
Burundi	Africa	Eastern Africa	6.1	2	?
Cambodia *	Asia	South-Eastern Asia	1.8	4.5	?
Cameroon	Africa	Middle Africa	1.4	2.1	?
Canada *	Americas	Northern America	2	34.7	1.94
Cape Verde *	Africa	Western Africa	6.5	5.7	?
Cayman Islands	Americas	Caribbean	8.2	9.2	?
Central African Republic	Africa	Middle Africa	20.1	1.8	?
Chad	Africa	Central Africa	?	1	?
Channel Islands	Europe	Northern Europe	0	14	?
Chile *	Americas	South America	4.8	12.1	2.79
China *	Asia	Eastern Asia	0.5	3.6	?
Christmas Island	Asia	South-East Asia	?	0	?
Colombia *	Americas	South America	22.6	10.1	20.38
Comoros	Africa	East Africa	?	1.5	?
Congo	Africa	Central Africa	?	2.4	?
Costa Rica *	Americas	Central America	11.2	10	7.59
Croatia	Europe	Southern Europe	1	13.7	2.83
Cuba *	Americas	Caribbean	5	2.1	0.5
Curaçao	Americas	Caribbean	19	2.6	?
Cyprus *	Asia	Western Asia	1.2	34	1
Czech Republic *	Europe	Eastern Europe	0.7	12.5	1.64
Denmark *	Europe	Northern Europe	1	9.9	0.91
Djibouti	Africa	East Africa	?	3.1	?
Dominica	Americas	Caribbean	20.8	6.2	?
Dominican Republic *	Americas	Caribbean	8.9	7.4	?
DR Congo *	Africa	Central Africa	?	1.2	?
Timor-Leste	Asia	South-Eastern Asia	4.1	0.3	?
Ecuador *	Americas	South America	7.8	2.4	?
Egypt *	Africa	Northern Africa	2.6	4.1	?
El Salvador *	Americas	Central America	37.2	12	78.52
England and Wales	Europe	Northern Europe	1.2	4.6	?
Equatorial Guinea	Africa	Central Africa	?	12.5	?
Eritrea	Africa	East Africa	?	0.4	?
Estonia *	Europe	Northern Europe	3.2	5	1.34
Eswatini	Africa	Southern Africa	11.6	4.8	37.16
Ethiopia *	Africa	Eastern Africa	8.8	0.4	?
Falkland Islands *	Americas	South America	?	62.1	?
Faroe Islands	Europe	Northern Europe	?	9.9	?
Fiji	Oceania	Melanesia	?	0.5	?
Finland *	Europe	Northern Europe	1.6	32.4	2.41
France *	Europe	Western Europe	1.3	19.6	2.33
French Guiana	Americas	South America	13.2	19.6	?
French Polynesia	Oceania	Polynesia	?	2.5	?
Gabon	Africa	Central Africa	?	3.4	?
Gambia	Africa	West Africa	?	6.5	?
Georgia *	Asia	Western Asia	1.9	10.1	1.44
Germany *	Europe	Western Europe	0.8	19.6	1.04
Ghana *	Africa	Western Africa	2.1	8	?
Gibraltar *	Europe	Southern Europe	3	4.1	?
Greece *	Europe	Southern Europe	0.8	17.6	1.35
Greenland *	Americas	Northern America	5.3	22.3	?
Grenada	Americas	Caribbean	12.4	4.6	?
Guadeloupe *	Americas	Caribbean	5.8	8.5	?
Guam	Oceania	Melanesia	?	11.5	?
Guatemala *	Americas	Central America	17.5	12.1	25.48
Guinea	Africa	West Africa	?	1	?
Guinea-Bissau	Africa	Western Africa	1.1	1.5	?
Guyana *	Americas	South America	20	15.8	?
Haiti *	Americas	Caribbean	6.7	2.6	?
Holy See	Europe	Southern Europe	0	0	?
Honduras *	Americas	Central America	36.3	14.1	29.4
Hong Kong *	Asia	Eastern Asia	0.3	3.6	0.03
Hungary *	Europe	Eastern Europe	0.8	10.5	0.85
Iceland *	Europe	Northern Europe	1.5	31.7	0.07
India *	Asia	Southern Asia	3	5.3	0.3
Indonesia *	Asia	South-Eastern Asia	0.4	0	?
Iran *	Asia	Southern Asia	2.2	7.3	?
Iraq	Asia	Western Asia	10.1	19.6	?
Ireland	Europe	Northern Europe	0.7	7.2	0.87
Isle of Man	Europe	Northern Europe	0	?	?
Israel *	Asia	Western Asia	1.5	6.7	1.38
Italy *	Europe	Southern Europe	0.5	14.4	1.13
Ivory Coast *	Africa	West Africa	?	4.4	?
Jamaica *	Americas	Caribbean	44.7	8.8	35.22
Japan *	Asia	Eastern Asia	0.3	0.3	0.02
Jordan *	Asia	Western Asia	1	18.7	?
Kazakhstan *	Asia	Central Asia	3.2	2.8	?
Kenya *	Africa	Eastern Africa	4	1.5	?
Kiribati	Oceania	Melanesia	?	0.8	?
Kosovo *	Europe	Southern Europe	2.4	23.8	?
Kuwait *	Asia	Western Asia	1.8	16.7	0.36
Kyrgyzstan	Asia	Central Asia	1.7	2.8	0.72
Laos *	Asia	South-East Asia	?	3	?
Latvia *	Europe	Northern Europe	2.6	10.5	1.86
Lebanon	Asia	Western Asia	1.9	31.9	?
Lesotho *	Africa	Southern Africa	43.6	4.8	?
Liberia *	Africa	Western Africa	3.3	2.1	?
Libya	Africa	North Africa	?	13.3	?
Liechtenstein	Europe	Western Europe	2.6	28.8	?
Lithuania	Europe	Northern Europe	3.7	13.6	?
Luxembourg	Europe	Western Europe	0.2	18.9	1.23
Macau *	Asia	Eastern Asia	0.3	3.6	?
Madagascar	Africa	East Africa	?	0.7	?
Malawi *	Africa	Eastern Africa	1.8	0.3	?
Malaysia *	Asia	South-Eastern Asia	2.1	0.7	?
Maldives *	Asia	Southern Asia	0.6	6.2	?
Mali	Africa	West Africa	?	1.1	?
Malta *	Europe	Southern Europe	1.6	28.3	?
Marshall Islands	Oceania	Melanesia	?	0.5	?
Martinique	Americas	Caribbean	2.8	8.5	?
Mauritania *	Africa	West Africa	?	2.8	?
Mauritius *	Africa	Eastern Africa	2.8	8.3	?
Mayotte	Africa	Eastern Africa	5.9	?	?
Mexico *	Americas	Central America	28.4	12.9	11.55
Micronesia	Oceania	Micronesia	?	0.7	?
Moldova *	Europe	Eastern Europe	2.3	3	0.77
Monaco	Europe	Western Europe	0	19.6	?
Mongolia	Asia	Eastern Asia	6	7.9	?
Montenegro *	Europe	Southern Europe	2.9	39.1	8.68
Montserrat	Americas	Caribbean	20.3	5.4	?
Morocco	Africa	Northern Africa	1.3	4.8	?
Mozambique	Africa	Eastern Africa	3.5	4.5	?
Myanmar *	Asia	South-Eastern Asia	28.4	1.6	?
Namibia *	Africa	Southern Africa	11.9	15.4	?
Nauru *	Oceania	Melanesia	?	0	?
Nepal *	Asia	Southern Asia	2.3	1.5	?
Netherlands	Europe	Western Europe	0.6	2.6	0.42
New Caledonia	Oceania	Melanesia	?	42.5	?
New Zealand *	Oceania	Australia, New Zealand	2.6	26.3	1.24
Nicaragua	Americas	Central America	7.9	5.2	7.09
Niger	Africa	Western Africa	4.4	0.5	?
Nigeria *	Africa	Western Africa	22	3.2	?
North Korea *	Asia	East Asia	?	0.3	?
North Macedonia	Europe	Southern Europe	1.2	29.8	?
Northern Cyprus	Asia	Western Asia	?	17.4	?
Northern Ireland *	Europe	Northern Europe	1.2	11	?
Northern Mariana Islands	Oceania	Micronesia	?	2.6	?
Norway *	Europe	Northern Europe	0.6	28.8	1.48
Oman *	Asia	Western Asia	0.3	16.7	?
Pakistan *	Asia	Southern Asia	3.8	22.3	?
Palau	Oceania	Melanesia	?	0.5	?
Palestine *	Asia	Western Asia	1	1.1	?
Panama *	Americas	Central America	11.1	10.8	9.95
Papua New Guinea *	Oceania	Melanesia	?	1	?
Paraguay *	Americas	South America	6.7	16.7	6.32
Peru *	Americas	South America	7.7	2	3.72
Philippines *	Asia	South-Eastern Asia	4.4	3.6	7.72
Poland *	Europe	Eastern Europe	0.7	2.5	0.2
Portugal *	Europe	Southern Europe	0.9	21.3	1.48
Puerto Rico *	Americas	Caribbean	18.5	11.5	?
Puntland	Africa	East Africa	?	12.3	?
Qatar *	Asia	Western Asia	0.4	16.7	0.15
Réunion	Africa	Eastern Africa	1.8	19.6	?
Romania *	Europe	Eastern Europe	1.5	2.6	0.14
Russia *	Europe	Eastern Europe	6.8	12.3	?
Rwanda	Africa	Eastern Africa	2.6	0.5	?
Saint Helena	Africa	Western Africa	0	?	?
Saint Kitts and Nevis *	Americas	Caribbean	18.8	3.4	?
Saint Lucia *	Americas	Caribbean	28.3	3.4	?
Saint Martin	Americas	Caribbean	?	8.5	?
Saint Pierre and Miquelon	Americas	Northern America	15.8	?	?
Saint Vincent and the Grenadines	Americas	Caribbean	17.2	3.4	?
Samoa	Oceania	Polynesia	?	10.1	?
San Marino	Europe	Southern Europe	0	14.4	?
São Tomé and Príncipe	Africa	Middle Africa	3.3	3.4	?
Saudi Arabia *	Asia	Western Asia	0.8	16.7	?
Scotland *	Europe	Northern Europe	1.1	5.6	?
Senegal	Africa	Western Africa	0.3	2	?
Serbia *	Europe	Southern Europe	1	39.1	3.23
Seychelles	Africa	Eastern Africa	10.2	4.1	?
Sierra Leone	Africa	Western Africa	1.7	0.5	?
Singapore *	Asia	South-Eastern Asia	0.2	0.3	0.01
Sint Maarten	Americas	Caribbean	?	4.2	?
Slovakia *	Europe	Eastern Europe	1.2	6.5	1.89
Slovenia *	Europe	Southern Europe	0.5	15.6	1.91
Solomon Islands	Oceania	Melanesia	?	0.2	?
Somalia	Africa	East Africa	?	12.4	?
Somaliland	Africa	East Africa	?	11.9	?
South Africa *	Africa	Southern Africa	33.5	9.7	10.47
South Korea *	Asia	Eastern Asia	0.6	0.2	0.06
South Sudan	Africa	Eastern Africa	14.9	9.6	?
Spain *	Europe	Southern Europe	0.6	7.5	0.57
Sri Lanka *	Asia	Southern Asia	3.5	2.4	?
Sudan	Africa	Northern Africa	5.1	6.6	?
Suriname *	Americas	South America	9.4	15.9	?
Sweden *	Europe	Northern Europe	1.1	23.1	1.31
Switzerland *	Europe	Western Europe	0.5	27.6	2.64
Syria	Asia	Western Asia	0.9	8.2	?
Taiwan *	Asia	Eastern Asia	0.8	0	0.87
Tajikistan	Asia	Central Asia	0.9	0.4	?
Tanzania	Africa	Eastern Africa	6.5	0.8	?
Thailand *	Asia	South-Eastern Asia	2.6	15.1	?
Togo	Africa	West Africa	?	0.8	?
Tonga *	Oceania	Polynesia	?	8	?
Trinidad and Tobago *	Americas	Caribbean	38.6	3.2	?
Tunisia	Africa	Northern Africa	4.8	1.1	?
Turkey *	Asia	Western Asia	2.5	16.5	1.95
Turkmenistan	Asia	Central Asia	4.2	0.4	?
Turks and Caicos Islands	Americas	Caribbean	5.7	3.3	?
Tuvalu *	Oceania	Polynesia	?	1.2	?
U.S. Virgin Islands	Americas	Caribbean	49.3	16.6	?
Uganda	Africa	Eastern Africa	9.7	0.8	?
Ukraine *	Europe	Eastern Europe	6.2	9.9	1.36
United Arab Emirates *	Asia	Western Asia	0.7	16.7	?
United Kingdom *	Europe	Northern Europe	1.1	?	0.2
United States *	Americas	Northern America	6.4	120.5	12.21
Uruguay	Americas	South America	9.7	34.7	11.67
Uzbekistan	Asia	Central Asia	1.2	0.4	?
Vanuatu	Oceania	Melanesia	?	3.9	?
Venezuela *	Americas	South America	36.7	18.5	49.73
Vietnam *	Asia	South-Eastern Asia	1.5	1.6	?
Yemen *	Asia	Western Asia	6.8	52.8	?
Zambia *	Africa	Eastern Africa	5.4	0.9	?
Zimbabwe *	Africa	Eastern Africa	7.5	2.8	0.39

== See also ==
- Percent of households with guns by country
- List of countries by firearm-related homicide rates
