= List of countries by firearm-related homicide rates =

Homicide figures may include justifiable homicides along with criminal homicides, depending upon jurisdiction and reporting standards. Not included are accidental deaths, or justifiable deaths by any means other than by firearm.

Homicide rates from firearms per 100,000 people by country.

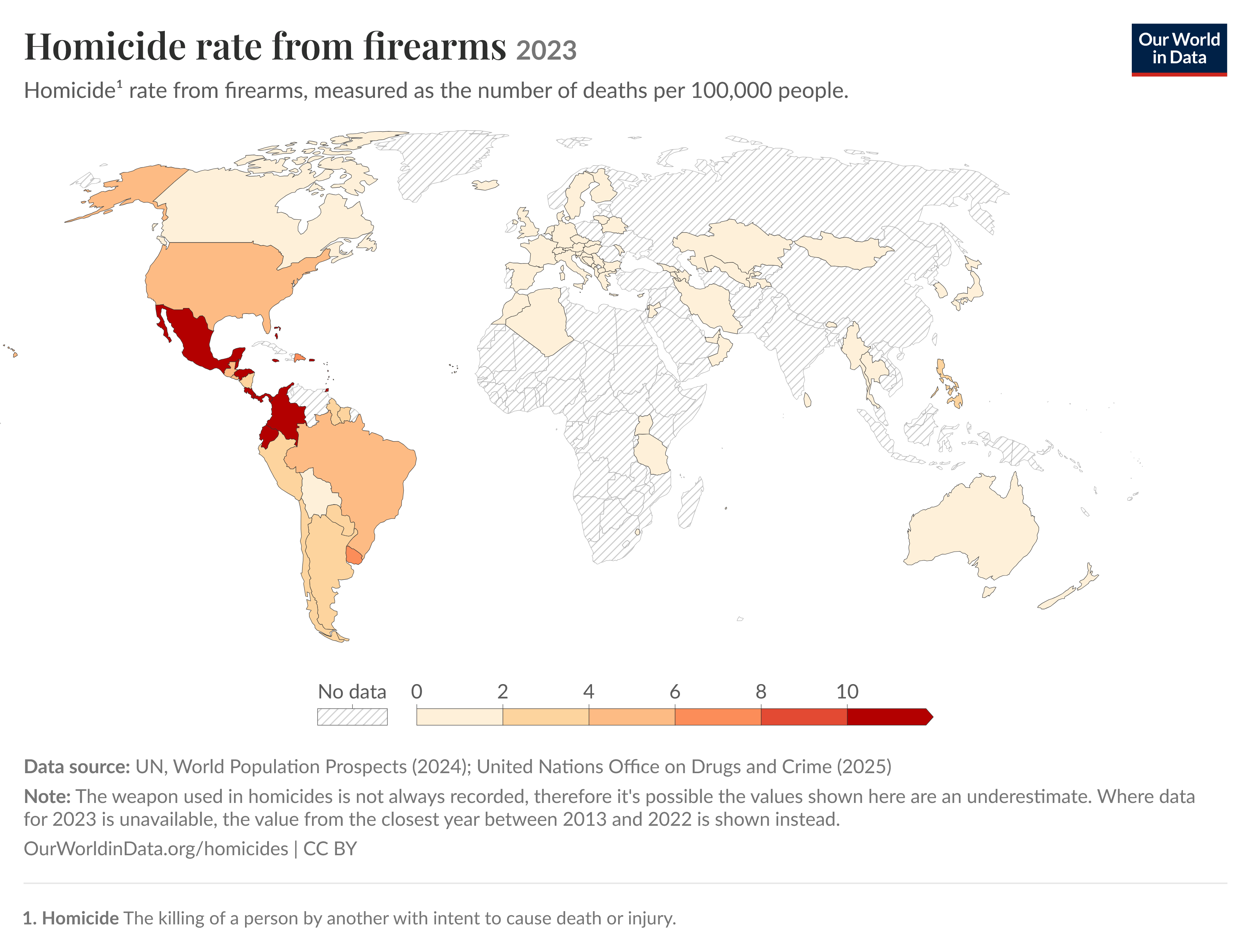
Homicide rates from firearms. Can expand more than the interactive map.

This is a list of countries by firearm-related homicide rate per 100,000 population by year.

== Table of homicide rates from firearms. Latest year ==
All the data in this table is from an Our World in Data (OWID) dataset that is sourced from United Nations Office on Drugs and Crime (UNODC). This latest-year format allows for easier sorting, ranking, and comparison of countries.

Rates are calculated per 100,000 inhabitants. Rates are to the 3rd decimal place in order to separate countries with low homicide rates. World region is according to OWID.

- Asterisk (*) in Location column indicates a Crime in LOCATION article.

Homicide rate per 100,000 population where the weapon was a firearm
Location	Rate	Year	Region
Albania *	0.889	2023	Europe
Algeria	0.108	2023	Africa
Andorra	0.000	2015	Europe
Antigua and Barbuda *	8.573	2023	North America
Argentina *	2.602	2023	South America
Armenia *	0.374	2023	Asia
Australia *	0.095	2023	Oceania
Austria *	0.186	2023	Europe
Azerbaijan *	0.166	2021	Asia
Bahamas	29.431	2022	North America
Barbados	4.959	2023	North America
Belarus *	0.211	2014	Europe
Belize *	22.596	2022	North America
Bermuda	4.641	2021	North America
Bhutan *	0.000	2020	Asia
Bolivia *	0.057	2023	South America
Bosnia and Herzegovina	0.722	2023	Europe
Brazil *	5.809	2023	South America
Bulgaria *	0.240	2017	Europe
Canada *	0.735	2023	North America
Cape Verde *	2.143	2018	Africa
Chile *	3.322	2023	South America
Colombia *	17.851	2023	South America
Costa Rica *	14.239	2023	North America
Croatia	0.180	2023	Europe
Cyprus	0.297	2023	Europe
Czech Republic *	0.259	2023	Europe
Denmark *	0.052	2018	Europe
Dominica	15.035	2023	North America
Dominican Republic *	6.486	2023	North America
Ecuador *	39.533	2023	South America
Egypt *	2.019	2011	Africa
El Salvador *	4.825	2022	North America
England and Wales	0.049	2022	
Eswatini	1.409	2021	Africa
Finland *	0.180	2022	Europe
France *	0.098	2017	Europe
Georgia *	0.843	2018	Asia
Germany *	0.065	2020	Europe
Greece *	0.332	2023	Europe
Grenada	5.979	2023	North America
Guatemala *	4.408	2023	North America
Guyana *	3.025	2023	South America
Honduras *	23.147	2023	North America
Hong Kong *	0.000	2023	Asia
Hungary *	0.041	2023	Europe
Iceland *	0.000	2023	Europe
India *	0.296	2012	Asia
Iran *	0.366	2015	Asia
Italy *	0.170	2023	Europe
Jamaica *	41.869	2023	North America
Japan *	0.003	2019	Asia
Jordan *	0.297	2023	Asia
Kazakhstan *	0.103	2020	Asia
Liechtenstein	0.000	2016	Europe
Lithuania	0.107	2020	Europe
Luxembourg	0.180	2014	Europe
Macau *	0.000	2015	Asia
Malta	0.000	2023	Europe
Mauritius *	0.000	2022	Africa
Mexico *	17.231	2023	North America
Moldova *	0.163	2023	Europe
Monaco	0.000	2015	Europe
Mongolia	0.058	2023	Asia
Montenegro *	0.316	2023	Europe
Morocco	0.008	2023	Africa
Myanmar *	0.144	2023	Asia
Netherlands	0.160	2023	Europe
New Zealand *	0.234	2022	Oceania
Nicaragua	2.062	2021	North America
North Macedonia	0.270	2021	Europe
Northern Ireland *	0.052	2023	
Oman *	0.020	2023	Asia
Palestine *	0.366	2021	Asia
Panama *	10.003	2023	North America
Paraguay *	3.697	2023	South America
Peru *	3.836	2021	South America
Philippines *	2.341	2023	Asia
Puerto Rico *	18.153	2016	North America
Saint Kitts and Nevis *	57.744	2023	North America
Saint Lucia *	31.235	2023	North America
Saint Vincent and the Grenadines	42.439	2023	North America
Scotland *	0.036	2023	
Serbia *	0.384	2023	Europe
Slovakia *	0.109	2023	Europe
Slovenia *	0.000	2023	Europe
South Korea *	0.000	2021	Asia
Spain *	0.111	2023	Europe
Sri Lanka *	0.071	2019	Asia
Suriname *	2.226	2023	South America
Sweden *	0.502	2023	Europe
Switzerland *	0.135	2023	Europe
Tajikistan	0.062	2020	Asia
Tanzania	0.104	2015	Africa
Thailand *	1.459	2016	Asia
Trinidad and Tobago *	21.067	2020	North America
Uganda	0.660	2021	Africa
United Arab Emirates *	0.041	2021	Asia
United Kingdom *	0.051	2022	Europe
United States *	4.421	2023	North America
Uruguay	7.084	2023	South America
Uzbekistan	0.012	2019	Asia
Vatican City *	0.000	2023	Europe

== Table of homicide rates from firearms. Multiple years ==
All the data in this table is from United Nations Office on Drugs and Crime (UNODC).

There are 2 countries in the UNODC dataset that are missing from the table below: Egypt (2.062 rate in 2011) and India (0.297 rate in 2012).

Rates are calculated per 100,000 inhabitants. Rates are to the 3rd decimal place in order to separate countries with low homicide rates.

- Asterisk (*) in Location column indicates a Crime in LOCATION article.

Homicide rates by firearm per 100,000 inhabitants.
Location	2022	2021	2020	2019	2018	2017	2016	2015	2014
Albania *	1.126	1.751	1.430	1.635	1.599	1.528	1.493	1.596	2.427
Algeria	0.096	0.140	0.133	0.084	0.091	0.129	0.136	0.217	0.106
Andorra								0	0
Antigua and Barbuda *	8.532	4.291	3.238	2.171	3.274	10.975	4.417	1.112	
Argentina *	2.305	2.418	2.685	2.521	2.733	2.826		3.655	
Armenia *				0.674	0.212	0.631	0.523	0.903	0.277
Australia *	0.103	0.096	0.078	0.150	0.100	0.094	0.132	0.113	0.153
Austria *	0.145	0.179	0.135	0.101	0.090	0.182	0.103	0.058	0.105
Azerbaijan *		0.165	0.175	0.186	0.148	0.179	0.180		
Bahamas	28.538	25.496	14.269	19.528	20.154	26.816	23.739	28.521	26.983
Barbados	11.717	6.046	9.263	11.064	6.436	8.238	5.742	6.832	6.126
Belarus *									0.206
Belize *	22.454	22.748	20.004	23.388	25.127	21.885	22.324	19.729	20.151
Bermuda		4.674	3.124	0	4.719	4.741	7.928	1.584	3.157
Bhutan *			0	0	0	0	0	0	
Bolivia *	0.384	0.306	0.184	0.272	0.267	0.376	0.169	0.099	
Bosnia and Herzegovina	0.495	0.428	0.362	0.625	0.441	0.669	0.546	0.908	0.644
Brazil *			15.945						
Bulgaria *						0.237	0.152	0.287	0.244
Cape Verde *					1.926	2.124	5.552	2.717	4.761
Canada *	0.889	0.781	0.736	0.704	0.678	0.730	0.617	0.501	0.438
Chile *	3.637	2.221	2.617	1.854	2.016	1.818	1.532	1.466	1.442
Colombia *	18.127	18.252	16.344	16.149	16.470	18.357	18.528	19.682	21.126
Costa Rica *		8.304	7.905	7.474	7.955	8.711	7.765	7.865	6.750
Croatia	0.223	0.172	0.268	0.363	0.120	0.572	0.331	0.165	0.373
Cyprus	0.160	0.402	0.242	0.163	0.164	0.165	0.501	0.505	0.255
Czech Republic *	0.095	0.076	0.047	0.085		0.076	0.066	0.019	0.095
Denmark *					0.052	0.139	0.175		
Dominica		1.381	9.723	9.800	9.884	8.522	2.854	0	0
Dominican Republic *	6.724	6.116	4.409	4.264	4.914	5.767	5.918		11.116
Ecuador *	22.565	10.248	4.588	3.759	2.727	3.025	2.731	3.365	4.355
Egypt *									
El Salvador *	4.782	11.181	14.715	27.929	41.441	47.984	68.106	88.845	48.393
Eswatini		1.426							
Finland *				0.091	0.218	0.109	0.164	0.219	0.201
France *						0.100	0.142		
Georgia *					0.848				0.768
Germany *			0.065	0.048	0.045	0.052	0.069		
Greece *	0.318	0.268	0.257	0.236	0.329	0.206	0.242		
Grenada		0	1.617	0	2.462	0	0.834	0	
Guatemala *		3.436	3.554	6.197	6.712	8.457	33.380		26.270
Guyana *		2.983	3.387	4.131	2.546	2.882	4.216	5.695	
Holy See	0	0						0	0
Honduras *		28.721	26.962	30.194	27.112	29.158	41.868	42.294	53.364
Hong Kong *	0	0	0	0	0.027	0	0	0	0.014
Hungary *	0.040	0.021	0.072	0.031	0.123	0	0.041		0.030
Iceland *		0.270	0	0	0	0	0.298	0	0
India *									
Iran *								0.369	0.543
Italy *	0.202	0.154	0.171						
Jamaica *	44.706	44.206	39.639	39.769	36.097	47.857	39.248	34.855	25.677
Japan *				0.003	0.003	0.002			
Jordan *	0.425	0.242	0.311	0.449	0.335	0.460			
Kazakhstan *			0.105			0.349			0.261
Liechtenstein							0		
Lithuania			0.106	0.070	0.139	0.241	0.102		
Luxembourg									0.180
Macau *								0	0
Malta		0	0.776	0.596	0.203	0.417	0	0.438	0.672
Mauritius *	0	0.154							
Mexico *	17.497	19.333	20.346	20.679	20.723	17.842	13.106	10.654	10.058
Monaco								0	
Mongolia		0.090	0.061	0	0.190	0.065	0.099	0.101	0.276
Montenegro *	1.914	1.115	1.908	2.062	1.109	1.739	2.527	1.577	1.892
Morocco	0.024	0.005		0.094	0.025	0.014	0.009	0.043	0.006
Netherlands	0.216	0.194	0.184	0.190	0.185	0.209	0.152	0.182	0.236
New Zealand *				1.230	0.248	0.232	0.171	0.152	0.133
Nicaragua		2.000		3.286	6.117	2.886	3.302		
North Macedonia		0.238	0.189	0.568		0.758	0.237	0.854	1.092
Northern Ireland *	0.157	0.210	0.158	0.264	0.106	0.107	0.322	0.270	0.109
Oman *	0.066			0.065	0.022	0	0.045	0	
Palestine *		0.370							
Panama *		10.227	9.361	8.624	7.058	6.494	7.078	8.087	11.289
Paraguay *		4.803	4.351	5.360	4.609	5.491	6.670	6.442	5.746
Peru *			2.937	2.288	3.357	3.113	3.312	3.416	4.194
Philippines *				1.103	1.567	3.050	4.286		
Puerto Rico *							18.382	15.898	17.697
Moldova *			0.227	0.289	0.255	0.283			0.120
Saint Kitts and Nevis *		25.207	12.594	18.863	33.500	39.761	60.685		
Saint Lucia *	30.580	26.162	22.317	17.359	12.367	18.062			
Saint Vincent and the Grenadines		20.128	17.203	9.531	20.897	22.738	27.368		
Serbia *	0.235	0.151	0.272	0.351	0.552	0.415	0.173	0.186	
Slovakia *	0.071	0.055	0.055	0.275	0.110	0.184	0.276	0.055	0.240
Slovenia *	0.142	0	0	0.284	0.095	0.143	0.048	0.048	0.193
South Korea *		0							
Scotland *		0.018	0.055	0.018	0.055	0.037	0.019	0.019	0
Spain *	0.105	0.082	0.078	0.112	0.105	0.135	0.084	0.097	0.121
Sri Lanka *				0.074	0.343	0.237	0.224	0.211	0.240
Suriname *	3.398	2.610	2.141	1.666	3.369	1.362	2.580		
Sweden *	0.597	0.430	0.463	0.438	0.423	0.398	0.301	0.335	0.287
Switzerland *	0.137	0.092	0.104	0.128	0.153	0.166	0.191	0.205	0.085
Tajikistan			0.063						
Tanzania								0.103	0.152
Thailand *							1.464	1.805	
Trinidad and Tobago *			20.551	28.488	27.647	25.497		23.285	20.956
Uganda		0.661	0.561			0.426	0.431		
United Arab Emirates *		0.043		0					
United Kingdom *		0.047			0.054	0.048	0.055	0.041	0.037
United States *			4.054	3.152	3.156	3.342	3.178	2.804	2.581
Uruguay	6.807	5.370	6.387	7.175	8.696	4.968	4.745	5.877	4.806
Uzbekistan				0.012	0.009	0.022	0.035		

== Charts and graphs ==
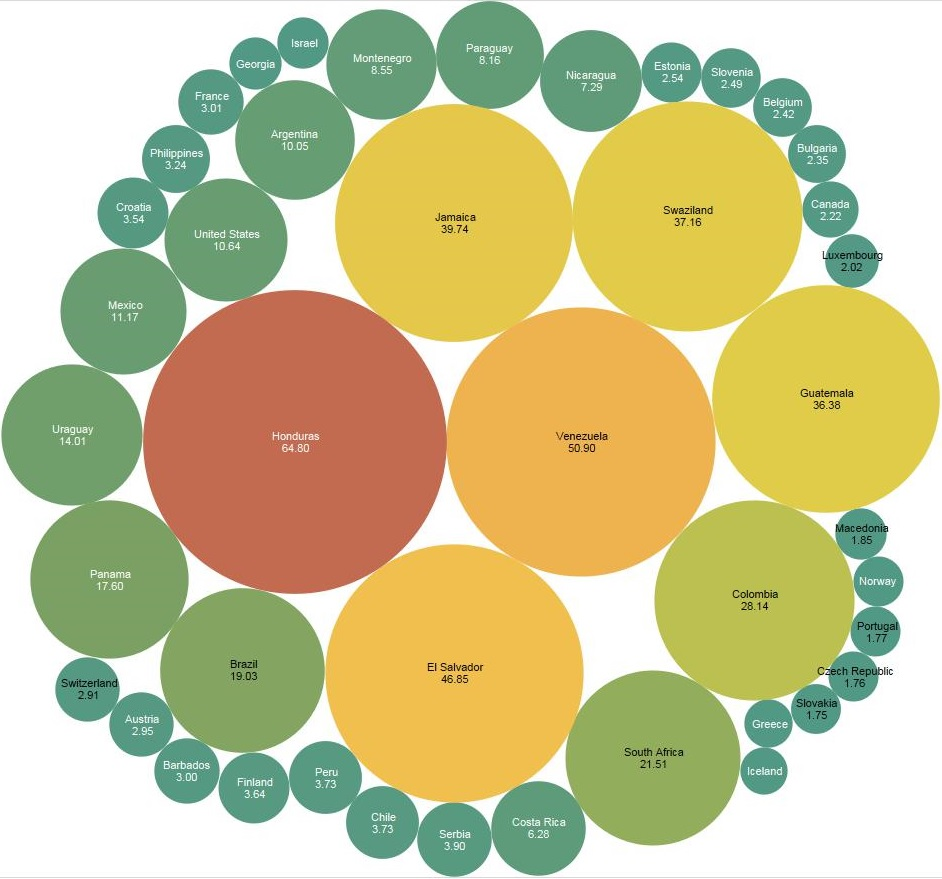
List of countries by firearm-related death rate—including homicides, suicides and accidental deaths.

Gun homicide rates as a function of gun ownership rates.

The U.S. substantially exceeds all other developed countries in mass shooting deaths.

Gun-related homicide and suicide rates in high-income OECD countries, 2010, sorted by total gun-related deaths (suicide plus intentional homicide, plus other)

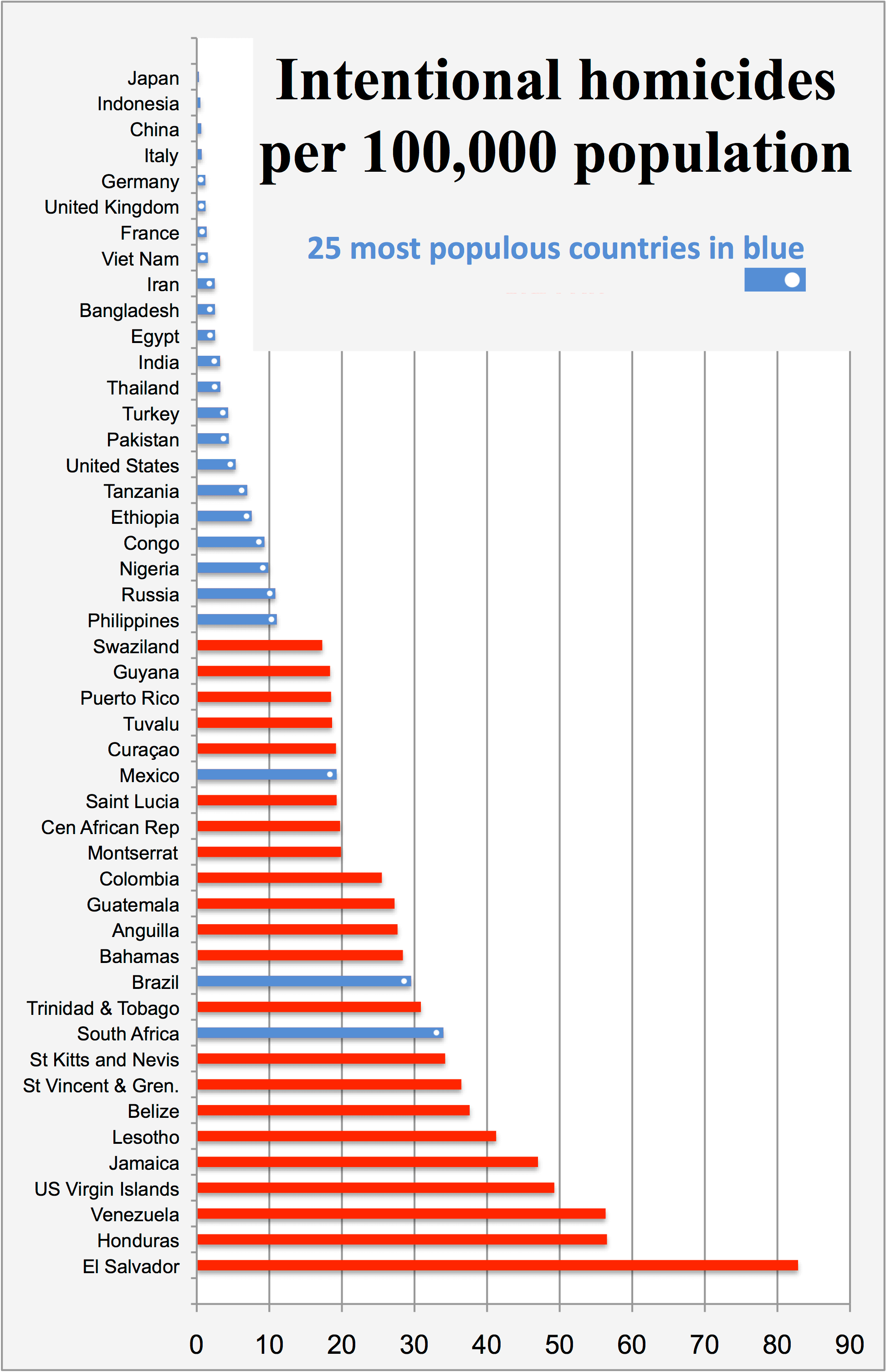
The 25 countries with the highest intentional homicide rates are generally less populous countries. Rates of the 25 most populous countries are shown in blue.

== See also ==
- Firearm death rates in the United States by state
- List of countries by intentional homicide rate
- List of countries by suicide rate
- List of cities by murder rate
- List of U.S. states and territories by violent crime rate
- List of U.S. states and territories by intentional homicide rate
- List of United States cities by crime rate (250,000+)
- Percent of households with guns by country
- United States cities by crime rate (100,000–250,000)
- United States cities by crime rate (60,000-100,000)
- Index of gun politics articles
- Estimated number of civilian guns per capita by country
