= Crime in Palestine =

- Homicide: 0.3 (2024)
- Assault: 13.0 (2023)
- Burglary: 0.3 (2024)
- Theft: 59.6 (2024)
- Fraud: 25.5 (2024)
- Corruption: 16.2 (2018)
- Money laundering: 0.3 (2022)
- Rape: 0.2 (2023)
- Sexual violence: 5.8 (2018)
- reported per 100,000 inhabitants

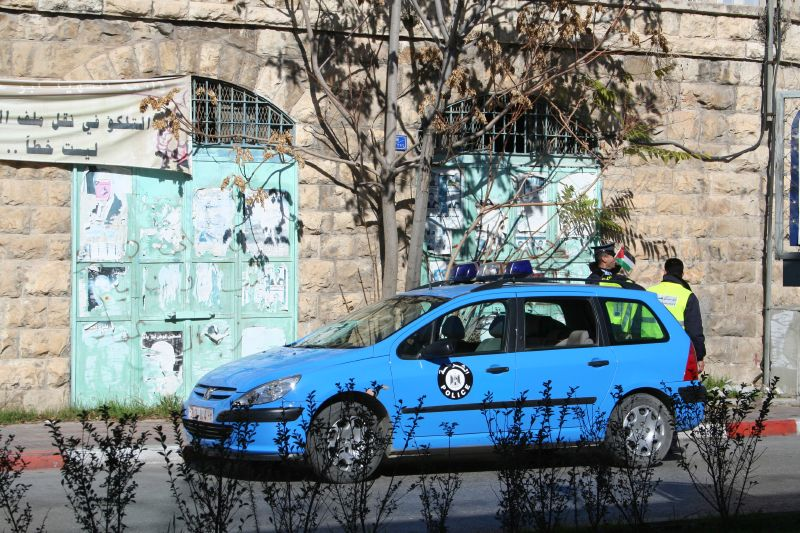
A Palestinian police car in Bethlehem.

Crime in Palestine is present in various forms which include theft, drug trafficking, arms trafficking, burglary, human trafficking and terrorism.

== Legal framework ==
The applicable criminal law differs by territory. In the West Bank, the Jordanian Penal Code No. 16 of 1960 (as amended) remains in force alongside Palestinian legislation on criminal procedure and prisons. In the Gaza Strip, the Criminal Code Ordinance No. 74 of 1936 (British Mandate) applies with local amendments. Administration of prisons in areas under the Palestinian Authority is governed by the Correction and Rehabilitation Centres (“Prisons”) Law No. 6 of 1998 and subsequent decisions placing the Directorate-General of Correction and Rehabilitation Centres within the Police. A reference guide to the Palestinian security and justice sectors provides an overview of this framework and institutions (police, prosecution, courts and prisons).

== Crime statistics ==
The Palestinian Central Bureau of Statistics (PCBS) publishes annual crime tables. The 2024 indicator table shows 1,035.6 reported criminal offenses per 100,000 population (note: Gaza Strip and areas of East Jerusalem annexed by Israel are excluded in the published series).

== Prisons and prison population ==
=== Active prisons in Palestine ===
==== West Bank ====
Between 2010 and 2013, The Netherlands funded the Strengthening the Management of the Palestinian Penitentiary System and the Rehabilitation of Inmates in Civil Prisons Administered by the Palestinian Authority program involving the Palestinian Ministry of Interior, Palestinian Civil Police and Correction and Rehabilitation Centers Directorate (CRCD).

The following prisons are operated by the Palestinian Ministry of Interior and Palestinian Civil Police:

- Jneid Prison (Northern West Bank)
- Jericho Prison

==== Gaza Strip ====
As of 2012, there were 5 prisons in the Gaza Strip, housing some 1,200 inmates. Gaza City central prison currently houses drug smugglers and drug users. The punishment for smoking hashish in the Gaza Strip goes from one year in prison up to execution; where civilians are executed by hanging and members of armed forces executed by firing squad. The prisons in Gaza are administered by authorities under the de facto Ministry of Interior and National Security (Hamas).

The Reform and Rehabilitation Centre for Women is the only female prison in Gaza. It houses a population of 19–50 women, babies, and toddlers. Inmates had to be moved amidst harsh conditions to different locations during 2012 and 2014 Gaza Wars in order to stay safe. At the end of 2016, the inmates were moved to a newer and bigger facility in the same complex.

In September 2022, Gaza authorities announced the execution of five prisoners, including two convicted of “collaboration” and three of murder. Reporting by international bodies and media has continued to document deaths in custody and conditions in Hamas-run prisons in Gaza.

=== Prisoner exchanges (2023-2025) ===
During negotiated pauses in fighting from late 2023 onward, Israel and Hamas conducted staged exchanges involving the handover of Israeli hostages in Gaza and the release of Palestinian prisoners and detainees from Israeli custody.

=== Legal basis and administration ===
Civil prisons in areas administered by the Palestinian Authority operate under the Correction and Rehabilitation Centres (“Prisons”) Law No. 6 of 1998, with the Directorate-General of Correction and Rehabilitation Centres attached to the Police by decision of 1998; UN project evaluations have supported capacity-building in these facilities.

== Crimes by type ==
=== Human trafficking ===
Prostitution in Palestine is illegal, under Palestinian law. Ramallah has prostitution, but long-term abstinence is common, as premarital sex is seen as taboo in the territories.

A 2009 report by the United Nations Development Fund for Women (UNIFEM) and SAWA-All the Women Together Today and Tomorrow, a Palestinian NGO, suggested that an increasing number of women turned to prostitution in the face of poverty and violence.

Recent international reporting continues to identify trafficking risks affecting the West Bank and Gaza within the broader Israel country narrative and in regional UN assessments.

=== Honor killings ===
According to UNICEF estimates in 1999, two-thirds of all murders in the Palestinian territories were likely honor killings.

Subsequent legal changes in the West Bank repealed provisions allowing mitigation of penalties in so-called “honour” cases (notably in 2011 and 2018), while broader penal-code reforms have been discussed in response to high-profile cases.

The Killing of Israa Ghrayeb took place on 22 August 2019 in the Palestinian city of Bethlehem. Israa Ghrayeb, 21 years old, was reportedly beaten to death in an "honor killing" because she posted a selfie with her fiancé a day before they were supposed to get engaged. Her family has denied the accusation, saying that instead she died of a heart attack.

== Torture by Palestinian security ==
Torture in Palestine refers to the use of torture and systematic degrading practices on Palestinians detained by Israeli and Palestinian forces in the West Bank and the Gaza Strip.

== Crimes in Israel by Palestinians ==
=== Property crimes by Palestinians ===
Director of the Latin American Institute of the American Jewish Committee in Washington, D.C. Dina Siegel, criminology professor H. G. van de Bunt, and lecturer in criminology Damián Zaitch claimed in their book Global Organized Crime that a significant amount of crime in Israel, especially property crime, is committed by the residents of the Palestinian Authority (PA).

==== Motor vehicle theft ====
Motor vehicle theft is a major crime committed by Palestinians. Since the early 1990s, there has been an increase in the rate of robberies in Israel. Between 1994 and 2001, the rate of robberies increased from 14.0 to 30.6 cases per 100,000 population. The reason behind this increase in robberies is analyzed as a result of the establishment of the Palestinian Authority in the West Bank and Gaza Strip which according to the book Global Organized Crime "serves as a safe haven for Palestinian offenders". However, the organized crime industry associated with motor vehicle theft involves not only Palestinians, but also Israeli citizens, both Jewish and Arab. The parts of the stolen cars are removed in "chop shops" in the Palestinian territories and then these vehicles are sold in the black market in Israel. Media reports suggest some of these vehicles are even-handed over to high-ranking Palestinian Authority officials. It was reported that since the beginning of 2010 through the end of February 2010, the Palestinian Authority police had destroyed 910 stolen cars.

Although Palestinian criminals are involved in organized crime in the country, Siegel et al. suggested one should not conclude that "organized crime in Israel is dominated by Palestinians. Organized crime committed by Jews or other non-Palestinians has been part of the Israeli crime scene for many years".

=== Arms trafficking by Palestinians ===
Arms trafficking is another form of crime, and it is directly associated with terrorism. There are many links between Israeli and Palestinian gangsters that facilitate these ventures.

== Crimes in Palestine by Israelis ==
According to Palestinian officials, between 2005 and 2015, there were 11,000 attacks on Palestinians by Israelis in the West Bank and in East Jerusalem, including price tag attacks. Between 2010 and 2015, three Palestinians were killed in arson attacks. Arson attacks on property were reported for 15 individual houses, 20 mosques and 4 churches.

== See also ==
- Crime in Israel
- Palestinian terrorism
