= Prostitution in Palestine =

Prostitution in Palestine is illegal under Palestinian law in both the West Bank and the Gaza Strip. A 2009 report by the UN Development Fund for Women (UNIFEM) and SAWA-All the Women Together Today and Tomorrow, a Palestinian NGO, suggested that while like in other places around the world a number of women turned to prostitution in the face of poverty and violence, in Palestine cases mainly stemmed from incidents of sexual violence, and occasionally forced marriage at a young age. The report urged the Palestinian authorities and Palestinian society to acknowledge the existence of the problem.

== History ==
Under Ottoman rule, there were no laws on prostitution. During the era of slavery in Ottoman Palestine, prostitution was connected to slavery. Since the principle of concubinage in Islam in Islamic Law allowed a man to have intercourse with his female slave, prostitution was practiced by a pimp selling his female slave on the slave market to a client, who was allowed to have intercourse with her as her new owner, and who after intercourse returned his ownership of her to her pimp on the pretext of discontent, which was a legal and accepted method for prostitution for centuries in the Islamic world.

After coming under British control during WW1, through 1948, the attitude of the authorities towards prostitution reflected those of Britain. Ordinances issued in 1925 (under High Commissioner Herbert Samuel) and 1927 (under Herbert Plumer) introduced laws on prostitution similar to those in Britain. Soliciting, living off the earnings of prostitutes, and the keeping of brothels were outlawed. There is evidence that in WW2, military authorities regulated brothels for soldiers, including medical examinations.

Prostitution is prohibited by Articles 309–318 of the Penal Code in the West Bank and Articles 161–166 of the Criminal Code of 1936 in Gaza.

== Overview ==
According to a report released in 2009, numbers of women in the Gaza Strip and the West Bank had been forced into prostitution by traffickers and family members. There were legally registered hotels and cleaning companies that offered "double services," which included sexual services for men. The report suggested that while like in other places around the world a number of women turned to prostitution in the face of poverty and violence, in Palestine cases mainly stemmed from incidents of sexual violence, and occasionally forced marriage at a young age. The report "Trafficking and Forced Prostitution of Palestinian Women and Girls: Forms of Modern Day Slavery" was supported by the UN Development Fund for Women (UNIFEM) and researched by "SAWA-All the Women Together Today and Tomorrow", a Palestinian NGO, during the first half of 2008.

The Palestinian laws prohibit forcing women into any illegal sexual intercourse -- as long as “such a woman is not a prostitute and is not known for her immoral character.” Shelters in Palestine refuse to provide assistance to sex workers.

Ramallah has prostitution, but long-term abstinence is common, as premarital sex is seen as taboo in the territories.

== See also ==
- Human rights in Palestine
- Women in Palestine
- Al Haq
- Al Qaws
- Aswat
- Honor killing

== Resources ==
"Trafficking and Forced Prostitution of Palestinian Women and Girls: Forms of Modern Day Slavery" UNIFEM 2008
