= Crime in Albania =

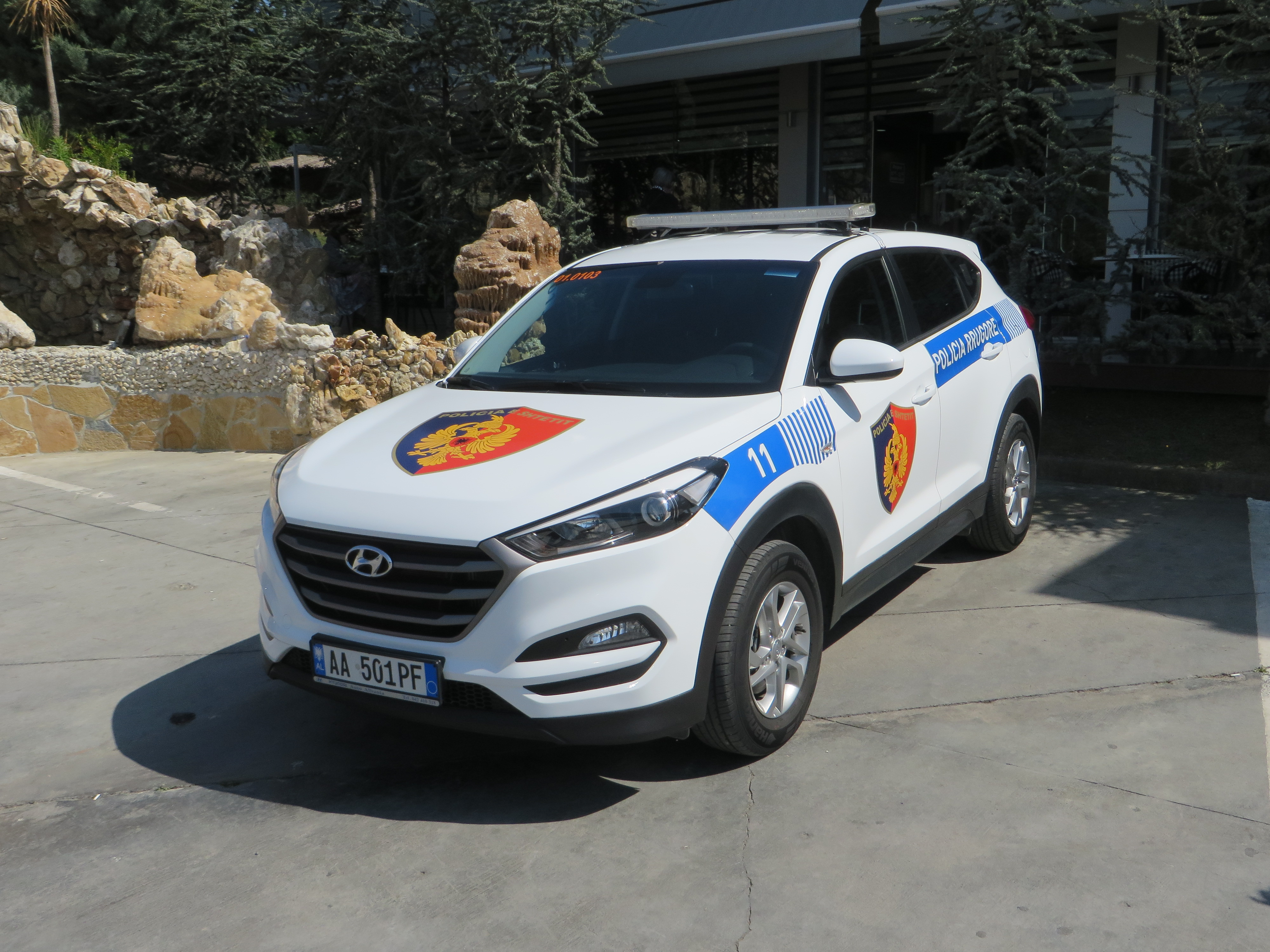
Police vehicle parked in Tirana.

Crime in Albania is moderate, but occurs in various forms. A crime is described as an act against the Albanian Penal Code for which there are judicial consequences such as punishments or fines. The Penal Code is based on the Constitution of the Republic of Albania, with general principles of international criminal law ratified by the Albanian state. Crimes in Albania can only be committed within the territory of the Republic of Albania, land space, maritime waters and air space under the sovereignty of the Albanian state. Albanian law is also applicable to foreign citizens committing crimes against or within the Albanian state. Crimes committed against humanity, which violate the independent and constitutional order are punishable. It is not possible to be punished for a crime through a violation of a law which is not written in the Albanian legal code. Internationally protected civilians are included in the Albanian protective system and can be extradited according to international agreements.

== Causal factors and attributes ==
There are many socio-cultural and socio-political factors connected to the criminal culture and statistics in Albania and amongst Albanians which is based on religious and cultural factors, such family relations and the former Communist system. Studies on the complexity of Albanian honor violence is an area which requires a careful approach as family members involved will often hold onto cultural values passionately, and no single factor can be explanatory. Historical factors, tribalism, warfare and low socio-economical factors, combined with a history of blood feuds, also contribute to crimes statistics. This results in isolation amongst families trapped in blood feuds and a decrease in the belief of the modern justice system. Studies on the Albanian blood feuds phenomena show that poor living conditions, mountainous habitats and low education contribute to isolation. Poverty in low income regions has also led to prostitution and organized crime, with children mostly being the victims. In general, crimes related to honor and masculinity tend to be stronger in Mediterranean countries, like Albania, than in northern Europe. Albanian families tend to feel obliged to take personal matters into their own hands as the trust for the judicial system is rather low.

== Origin ==
The first traces of criminality being handled within a system of codes, in the present day area of Albania, was in the 15th-century where the Kanun law was practiced amongst Albanian mountaineers. Although primitive, the system worked well, was often fast, cheap and left few crimes unsolved, in comparison with other European counterparts. Customary law was considered to be more authoritarian than written laws amongst Albanians.

== Crime during the Ottoman and Medieval period ==
As the Pashaliks of Scutari, Yanina, Berat, and Monastir all strove for decentralized systems of power in the mid-18th to the mid-19th centuries, lawlessness erupted as a central authority was absent. This meant that the Albanian pashaliks were responsible for their region and could personally alter the penal code for the citizens, though most Albanian local lords were still under the jurisdiction of the Sultan. For a period, the Albanian beys negotiated in their favor towards the Sublime Porte which resulted in extended landownership, concentrating power in the hands of a few powerful families. This resulted in a status of extensive lawlessness being imposed on the Albanian provinces, with the local beys fighting each other. The Porte responded with "Divide et impera" hoping to avoid a loss of control. In 1847, during the southern Albanian revolts, the local beys resisted the Porte's taxation system (tanzimat) which risked the feudal relations of merchants and craftsmen. The Albanian highlanders refused to accept the conscriptions of the military law of 6 September 1843.

== Crime in the 20th century ==
Albanian law was first officially applicable to Albanian citizens in 1912 after the Albanian declaration of independence. The government approved the decision of "the new organization of justice" on May 10, 1913. With the decision of the Conference of Ambassadors in London, and with Prince Wilhelm zu Weid becoming the prince of Albania on April 10, 1914, the "Organic Statute of Albania" was proclaimed in Vlore. There was a council of the elderly, judges of peace, first instance courts and courts of appeal. Albanian criminal justice system was the same as of other European socialist countries in 1946 with the model of the People's Republic of Albania in 1946 being taken from the USSR. In 129, the Penal Code of the former Kingdom of Albania was in force. Between 1945 and 1952, the penal law was separated with different enactments and criminal procedures. A new code was adopted in 1952. With the constitutional reform of 1977, the Penal code was reformed and has been practiced since then. An entirely new code was brought to practice at the end of 1990. The code of criminal procedure was first adopted in 1953 and in 1968, a system of advocates was established. In 1991, the Constitution was changed by the new pluralist parliament after the election of March 31, 1991. The gap between the authorities and the population increased after the fall of communism which increased religious practices and nationalism. In the 1990s, religious aids were sent to Albania as an antidote to the crime waves. When the isolation ended, many Albanians settled abroad, and after having gathered information from other groups, an independent Albanian network of organized crime emerged.

== Today ==
Much of the crimes committed today are tied to the Albanian mafia both in Albania, but also in other European countries. The cocaine market in the UK is owned by the Albanian mafia. There are also problems with Albanian media portraying murders as "blood feuds" and many who are arrested suspected of murder use the phrase "I did it for blood feud" thus complicating forensic investigations. There are also signs of "blood feud certificates" where civilians purchase certificates by corrupt officials in order to apply for asylum in European countries with complicated stories of blood feuds. Albanian authorities are however quick to file reports and initiate prosecutions, with serious penalty, thus lowering the murder rate. However, a change of culture is needed in order to eradicate the phenomenon, requiring roughly 25 years.

There is also a cultural phenomenon of how organized crime is portrayed in modern-day media, with Albanians being portrayed as mainly antagonists. Organized crimes is defined by UN as "a structured group of three or more persons, existing for a period of time and acting in concert with the aim of committing one or more serious crimes or offences established in accordance with this Convention, in order to obtain, directly or indirectly, a financial or other material benefit". Albanian organized crime has become a transnational phenomenon with ties in Kosovo, North Macedonia, Montenegro and the Italian and Colombian mafia as well. Much of the organized crimes is based on families with consanguinity belonging to the same clan and village. The networks are made of "people of the village" which discourages dropouts. Organized crime in Albania has also expanded on the European heroin market which has led media corporates displaying Albanian criminals' main objectives as drug trafficking, human trafficking, car trafficking and money laundering. Albanian authorities have been criticized by the international community because they do not hinder criminal activities. In 2013, The U.S. Department of state pointed out in a report the necessity of the implementation of laws and convictions of suspects. The Albanian authorities have decreased anti-trafficking law enforcements as a result of a lack of evidence. Family ties and nepotism and favouritism is seen as a possible factor in the corruption amongst Albanian officials in the court system resulting in difficulties in investigations which has put Albania in the 116th place of 175 countries in accordance to the Corruption Perception Index. Money laundering helps syndicates diversify their revenues, which is a result of the fall of communism, which allowed for organized crime to penetrate into politics. In May, 2019, the Albanian government was criticized for having links to the organized crime.

== See also ==
- Albanian mafia
- Law enforcement in Albania
- List of assassinations in Albania
