= Prostitution in Albania =

Prostitution in Albania is illegal.

Prior to the collapse of the Soviet Union in the early 1990s, prostitution in Albania was virtually unknown. Migration from rural areas to cities, and the economic problems following the Soviet collapse, caused some women to turn to prostitution.

Street prostitution occurs near the centre of the capital, Tirana, mainly by Roma men and women. Some students work as prostitutes from hotels or motels in Tirana and other large cities, where brothels are also found.

The NGO Aksion Plus provides sex workers with advocacy, education and support.

== Legislation ==
Three articles of the Criminal Code of the Republic of Albania outlaw prostitution and related activities:

- Article 113, Prostitution (buying and selling of sex)
- Article 114, Exploitation of prostitution ("encouragement, mediation, or receipt of compensation for exercising prostitution")
- Article 115, Use of premises for prostitution ("managing, utilizing, financing, or renting premises for purposes of prostitution")
- Articles 110(a) and 128(b) prohibit sex and labour trafficking and prescribe penalties of eight to 15 year's imprisonment.

== Sex trafficking ==
Human traffickers exploit domestic and foreign victims in Albania, and traffickers exploit victims from Albania abroad. Albanian women and children are subject to sex trafficking and forced labor within the country, especially during tourist season. Traffickers use false promises such as marriage or employment offers to force victims into sex trafficking. Albanian victims are subject to sex trafficking in countries across Europe, particularly Kosovo, Greece, Italy, Belgium, Germany, Switzerland, North Macedonia, Norway, the Netherlands, and the UK. Foreign victims from European countries and the Philippines were subjected to sex trafficking and forced labour in Albania. Middle Eastern, Central Asian and African migrants who transit Albania to reach Western Europe are also vulnerable.

In 2018, the Albanian State Police arrested 20 suspected sex traffickers on behalf of Italian and Greek authorities.

The United States Department of State Office to Monitor and Combat Trafficking in Persons ranks Albania as a 'Tier 2' country.
