= Crime in Costa Rica =

Costa Rica is a Central American nation that boasts of a noteworthy safety record on crime as compared to its neighbors in the region. It is one of few nations that have abolished their nation's armed forces. Having had a stable past, this country has been successful in developing its economy. However, since 2000 there has been a significant rise in criminal activity. Increase in domestic illegal activity, such as theft, homicide, and organised crime, has overwhelmed the local population. Sebastian Huhn reports that, "In a public opinion poll in 2011, 45 percent of Costa Rican respondents said that crime and insecurity were the country’s biggest social problems." As a consequence of the overall societal changes, domestic-driven crime has been increasing in the environment that extends beyond traditional settings. Illegal activity, including distribution of weapons has been most commonly witnessed during the sporting events by 'barras' or fan clubs. Crime in Costa Rica, thus, is not only due to domestic crime groups but also transnational criminal organisations.

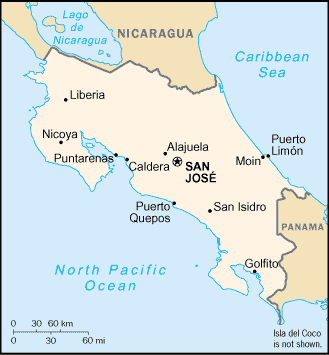
Map of Costa Rica

As Vice President Laura Chinchilla described in March 2008:

"Costa Rica was known in the world as a nation of peace and tolerance. Over the course of our history, we (have) learned to solve our differences and conflicts through dialogue and with respect for others. These distinctive traits have been challenged in recent years by the increase of crime and violence."

== Types of crime ==
=== Crimes targeting tourists ===
"Nearly 3 million people visited Costa Rica in 2017, and overall they spent $3.87 billion during their stay." Crime in Costa Rica that impacts tourists is usually in form of petty theft and occasional armed robberies. Especially at night tourists need to observe a high degree of precaution. Additionally, murder and sexual assault have also been types of crime that have been committed against tourists. Cases of Arancha Gutiérrez and María Trinidad Mathus, both occurring in August 2018, are the most recent examples of tourists suffering from the rise in criminal activity. These cases of murder and assault, respectively, indicate that crimes are escalating and are becoming quite severe. These cases additionally highlight the lack of punishment that offenders receive. For example, the two individuals linked to the Mathus case were arrested; however, one was released due to lack of evidence, and the other was sentenced to three months of pretrial detention. Similarly, in case of Arancha Gutiérrez, the man suspected and linked to the assault was released without any charges, and was transferred to the custody of the immigration police for being in the country illegally.

In August 2018, Tourism Minister María Amalia Revelo commented on the adverse impact that these deaths and assaults could have on tourism and the need for more police presence. The minister also highlighted the restrictions on her office's ability to respond to crimes due to the Costa Rican government's fiscal policy issues. Security Minister Michael Soto also remarked that the nation's image has already been damaged, which is reflected in the decrease in tourism.

=== Homicide ===
"The nation of about five million people, still regarded as being one of the safest as compared to others in Central America, saw 603 homicides last year, according to preliminary data from the police service responsible for investigating them.".

Previously, 2015 was the year in which homicide rates were the highest. Currently, the Costa Rican Star reports that there has been a decline in the rate of homicide in areas throughout Costa Rica. Most notably, this decline is in the areas of San Jose and Guanacaste, wherein numbers have reduced by 19% and 62% respectively. As of early 2018, 48% of the homicides accounted for in Costa Rica were linked to drug-related gang violence, with 25% being related to drug trafficking.

=== Organised crime and drug-related crime ===
Costa Rica's main problem with drug trafficking relates to its geography and its prime maritime network that facilitates drug trafficking on an international scale. Costa Rica's maritime jurisdiction is more than 11 times the size of its land mass, rendering it even more difficult to police and monitor trading activity. It has been reported that “Between 2000 and 2015, the country’s murder rate nearly doubled from 6.3 to 11.5 per 100,000 citizens. Up to 70 percent of the violence has been associated with territorial battles between local drug gangs.”.

Additionally, Michael Porth reported that Costa Rica has had a history of drug trafficking and money laundering since the mid-1980s. This has progressively worsened over the years and has become more reactionary to other international factors such as the United States' increase in border control and anti-drug operations. These operations have caused the drug trafficking organisations to use Costa Rica as their ‘pit-stop’ and preferred laundering area. The geography of the land makes it a prime location for hiding and transporting drugs. For example, the area of Limon that lies along the coast not only holds one of the main seaports but is also the main locale for drug trafficking. Additionally, the areas of the Gulf of Puntarenas and Puerto Quepos, which lie on the Pacific coast, are used as refueling stops for shipments coming from neighboring areas of Colombia and Panama.

This issue has aggravated to the point that the Costa Rican Minister of Public Security, José María Tijerino Pacheco, has stated that without aid and intervention from nations such as the United States, “...the region is going to degenerate into another Mexico.”. The 2017 International Narcotics Control Strategy Report also highlighted the issue of money laundering occurring through banks. In March and April 2011, it was reported that nine Guatemalans who were linked to Mexican drug trafficking organisations were detained at the Paso Canoas and Peñas Blancas border crossings. A common issue that has underpinned drug trafficking is the change of influence of the neighboring nations. Influence has shifted from more group-orientated drug trafficking from Colombia to relatively prevalent independent and smaller groups as per the influence of the Mexican drug trafficker. Lack of resources and defence has been recognized by the government as the key factor in the inability to prevent and weaken the amount of drug trafficking that is occurring in Costa Rica. The Chamber of Commerce officials in Puntarenas outlined that the drug cartels have come to portray themselves as fishing businesses and use strategies of coercion, either with or without weaponry or by paying other fisherman, to get the illicit substances on land. Most legitimate businesses, from farms to transport services, have been bought by Mexican cartels in the attempt to hide and transport cocaine.

Further, production of cannabis is also an issue in Costa Rica, particularly in an area called Talamanca. This remote area has also been highlighted as being involved with the trafficking of cocaine.

== Crime prevention ==
=== Government intervention ===
==== Historically ====
Discourse around crime rates in Costa Rica progressed throughout the late 1990s in an emotive manner and became more evident through the change in leadership, most notably through presidents Figueres, and Rodríguez. For example, in a speech by Miguel Ángel Rodríguez, he highlights the state of the prisons and the need for development of social policy and security.

"The action against crime has made it necessary to expand the capacity of the prisons.... To restore tranquility and seguridad ciudadana it will be essential to reform legislation, to help the police fight criminals and to avoid impunity... The people demand harsher laws against crime, ladies and gentlemen. I therefore ask you with humility and vehemence to answer those demands by passing these laws without delay"

Academics highlight that the perception of crime and its prevalence was to an extent manufactured by the government as a means to support the strict legislation that they put in place. Additionally, it is also suggested that the accuracy of statistics about the criminal activity occurring could be worse due to police violence.

==== Currently ====
===== Anti-drug legislation =====
- General Health Law (Law 5395)
  - Aims to prevent and prohibit the cultivation, production and trafficking of drugs.
- Narcotics And Psychotropic Substances law (Law 8204) now reformed in 2009 to the “Law on Narcotics, Psychotropic Substances, Unauthorised Drugs, Related Activities, Money Laundering and the Financing of Terrorism”.
  - Outlines the crimes in a detailed manner and includes provisions through which penalties are determined and meted out.
  - UNDOC most notably highlights that a key progressive element of the Law 8204 is the reform of Article 77 which accounts for a gender perspective. In this, it does not set a minimum punishment, but rather relies on judicial discretion to set a sentence for women. This reform recognized the prevalence and likelihood of women in poverty having to participate in drug trafficking out of necessity or as an escape from threatening circumstances.

A recent study conducted by Oya Dursun-Özkanca outlined five key problems with the reforms made to the Security Sector. These include the size of the police force, lack of resources, adequate training, especially for security matters that extended beyond their normal jurisdictions and fragmentation among organisations.

In an interview with the New York Times, it was reported by the coast guards in Puntarenas that they lacked adequate boating equipment to stop and search most of the skiffs that cross the waters. This problem exists across all key ports in Costa Rica, as out of the 26 boats involved in the maritime security, only 14 function (as of 2011)

=== Cost of crime ===
"Violent crime costs Central America an estimated $6.5 billion a year, equivalent to 7.7 percent of gross domestic product in the region, according to the study carried out in El Salvador...In total, the costs of violence amounted to $2.29 billion in Guatemala, $2.01 billion in El Salvador, $791 million in Costa Rica and $529 million in Nicaragua."

It has been outlined that due to multiple decades of social programs and the allocation of funding towards more progressive social change, Costa Rica, in comparison to other nations in Central America, incurs lower cost when it comes to negating the consequences of crime.

=== Partnerships and bilateral agreements ===
==== UNODC-WCO container control program and regional training ====
In 2013, in collaboration with UNODC and the World Customs Organization, Costa Rican Government "joined the Container Control Program after signing a memorandum of understanding with UNODC". The main purpose of this project was to target illegal drug trafficking, smuggling and any main illegal activity taking place at the Port of Caldera (Puerto Caldera).

In July 2013, the United Nations Office on Drugs and Crime (UNDOC) and the World Customs Organisation (WCO) provided training to Costa Rican customs officials with the intention of enhancing the ability of border patrol to recognize illicit substances immediately. This aided in creating an infrastructure for governments to detect illicit materials and increase responsiveness of certain maritime ports, which was the core aim of the Container Control Program. The Program was originally signed in 2010 and was supposed to be upheld only for three years. Due to the positive results that became evident from the program, an extension of this period was requested. “.... Since its beginning in 2010 through July 2013, this Unit has achieved seizures of 1.6 tons of drugs, 9 containers with counterfeit goods of major brands and 2 containers of tax fraud.”.

==== Cooperation program between Latin American, The Caribbean and the European Union on Drug Policy (COPLAD) ====
Purpose of this partnership is to improve the impact and the consistency of drug policy among nations. In 2017, the Costa Rican Drug Institute (Instituto Costarricense sobre Drogas, ICD) hosted the first meeting of the working group of Latin American countries which was aimed at establishing a criterion on prevention. The meeting was successful in the sense that the attendees incorporated individual drug policies and strategies across multiple nations and were able to become more uniform in their public policy. In 2018, it was announced that the COPLAD organisation has and will be working with other organisations such as WHO, PAHO, EMCDDA and the UNODC, to support new plans to provide improved health services for those who use drugs. This plan will be implemented in all CELAC states, including Costa Rica.

==== Aid from the United States of America ====
Previously, the American Drug Enforcement Administration has aided in some of the largest seizures of illicit substances.

As of 2018, the U.S. Embassy in San Jose, Costa Rica, has announced funding to be integrated over the next two years. This funding is aimed towards enhancing and supporting US government objectives, and to this effect, it focuses on the enhancement of security and government organization. An element of this is a part of a preexisting project, namely Central American Security Initiative (CCARSI), which partners with nations within Central America to reduce organised crime.
