= Crime in Benin =

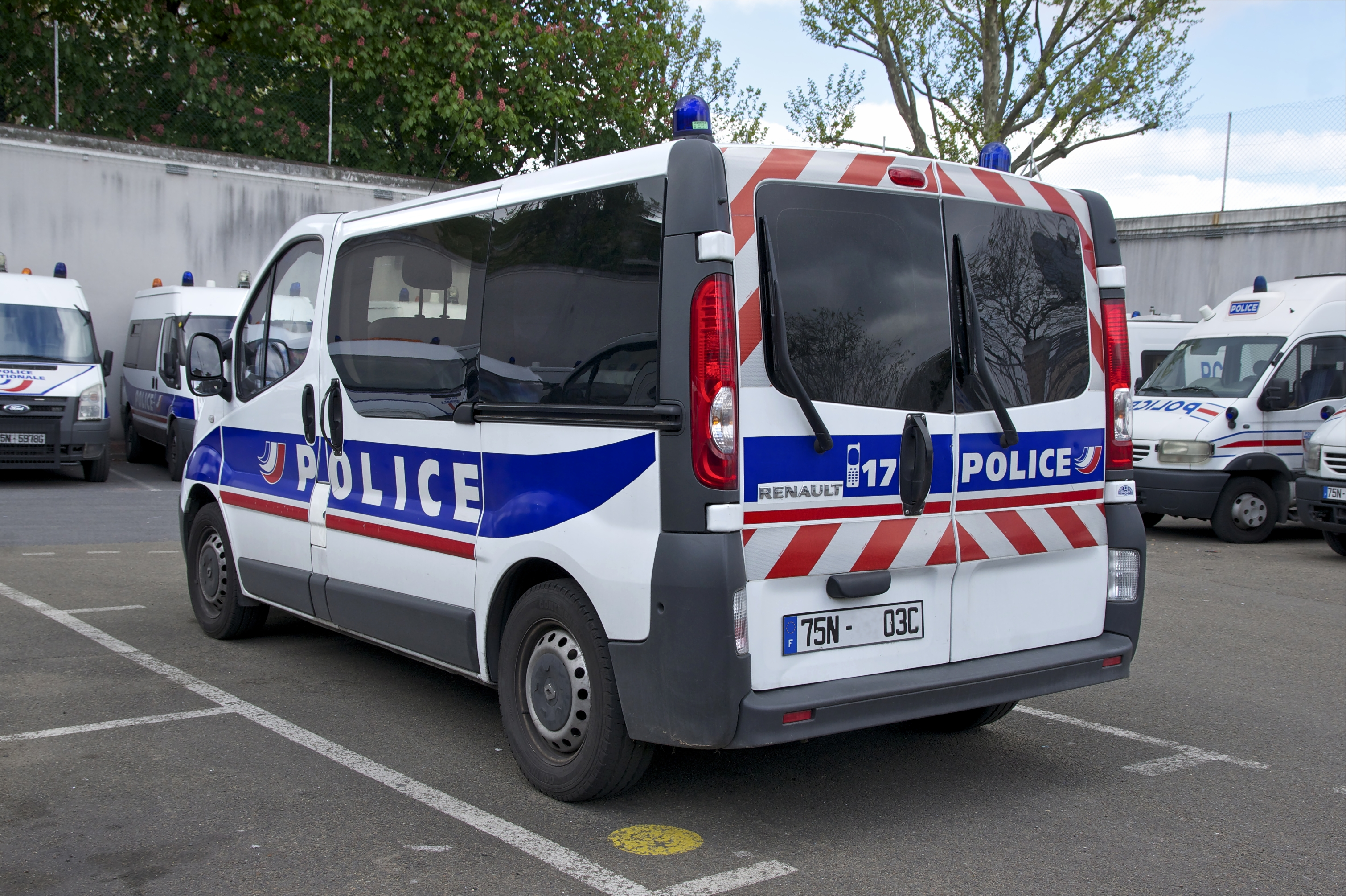
Police vehicles of the Benin Police parked.

Crime in Benin is high and especially targets visitors.

== Crime by type ==
=== Robbery ===
Petty crime is common throughout Benin. Street robbery is a significant problem in Cotonou. Robbery and mugging occur along the Boulevard de France (the beach road by the Marina and Novotel Hotels) and on the beaches near hotels frequented by international visitors. Most of the reported incidents involve the use of force, often by armed persons, with occasional minor injury to the victim. Even in daylight hours, foreigners on the beach near Cotonou are frequent victims of robberies.

There has been a continued increase in the number of robberies and carjacking incidents after dark, both within metropolitan Cotonou and on highways and rural roads outside of major metropolitan areas. Overland travel to Nigeria is dangerous near the Benin/Nigeria border due to unofficial checkpoints and highway banditry.

=== Drug trafficking ===
Drug trafficking in Benin is increasing, due mainly to the porous borders and lack of government intervention of the illegal drug trafficking. While neighboring countries are making a concerted effort to fight the drug trade, the traffickers are using Benin to traffic drugs from South America into the United States and Europe. Drug use within Benin is low, with marijuana being the drug of choice. Marijuana is grown in the central region of Benin.

=== Fraud ===
There is a high rate of credit card and automated teller machine (ATM) fraud, largely targeting foreigners.

=== Corruption ===
In 2011, Transparency International ranked Benin as 100th of 182 countries on perceived corruption. Benin's score was 3 with 10 being the best possible score.
