= María Amalia Revelo =

Costa Rican businesswoman and minister (1955–2021)

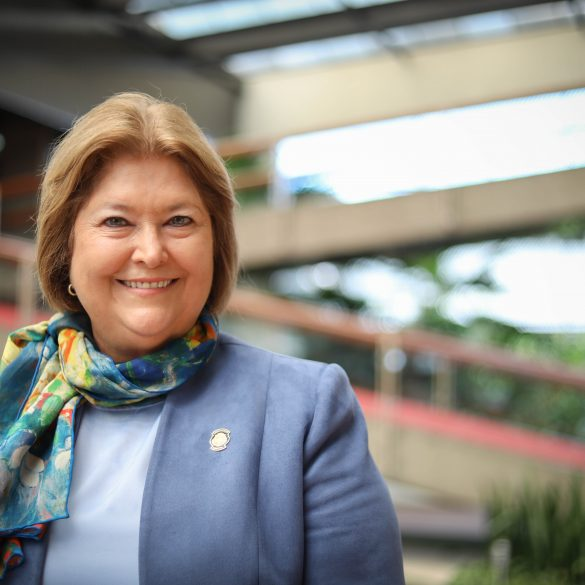
- Revelo in 2018

Minister of Tourism of Costa Rica
- In office 9 May 2018 – 8 July 2020
- President: Carlos Alvarado Quesada
- Preceded by: Mauricio Ventura Aragón
- Succeeded by: Gustavo Segura Sancho

Personal details
- Born: María Amalia Revelo Raventós; 18 August 1955 Catedral, Costa Rica
- Died: 14 May 2021 (aged 65) San Rafael de Montes de Oca, Costa Rica
- Party: PLN

María Amalia Revelo Raventós (18 August 1955 – 14 May 2021) was a Costa Rican businesswoman and government minister. She served as Minister of Tourism from 2018 to 2020 and led the Instituto Costarricense de Turismo.

== Biography ==
Born in 1955 in Catedral, Revelo graduated from the University of Costa Rica in 1978 with a degree in business administration. She earned a master's degree from INCAE Business School in 2006. She was married to Guillermo Martí Volio but divorced him in 1992. The couple had a son, Juan Carlos Martí Revelo.

Revelo began her career in tourism at an early age and spent more than 46 years in the field, 23 of them in the airline market, six in the hospitality sector, five in airports, and eight promoting Costa Rica internationally. At the age of 20, she began working for LACSA, which later became Avianca Costa Rica. In 1995, she began working for the Ministry of Tourism under the government of José María Figueres. She became sales director of TACA. Afterwards, she became a consultant at the International Center for Human Development, where she sought to raise awareness for the Central American Integration System.

From 2008 to 2012, she was deputy manager of the Instituto Costarricense de Turismo and served on numerous boards of directors. She was also Vice-President and an honorary member of the Costa Rica Tourism Professionals Association. She worked as commercial director of the Juan Santamaría International Airport from 2012 to 2018, advising the creation of new air routes.

On 9 May 2018, President Carlos Alvarado Quesada appointed Revelo Minister of Tourism following his victory in the 2018 Costa Rican general election. She was a member of the National Liberation Party (PLN) and had originally supported Antonio Álvarez Desanti in the election.

On 30 May 2020, Revelo fell ill after a surgical operation. She submitted her resignation to President Quesada, who accepted it and thanked her for her two years of service to Costa Rican tourism.

María Amalia Revelo died in San Rafael de Montes de Oca on 14 May 2021 at the age of 65.

== Awards ==
- Mejor Promotora Turística (1987)
- Mujer Pionera del Turismo (2007)
