= Crime in the Dominican Republic =

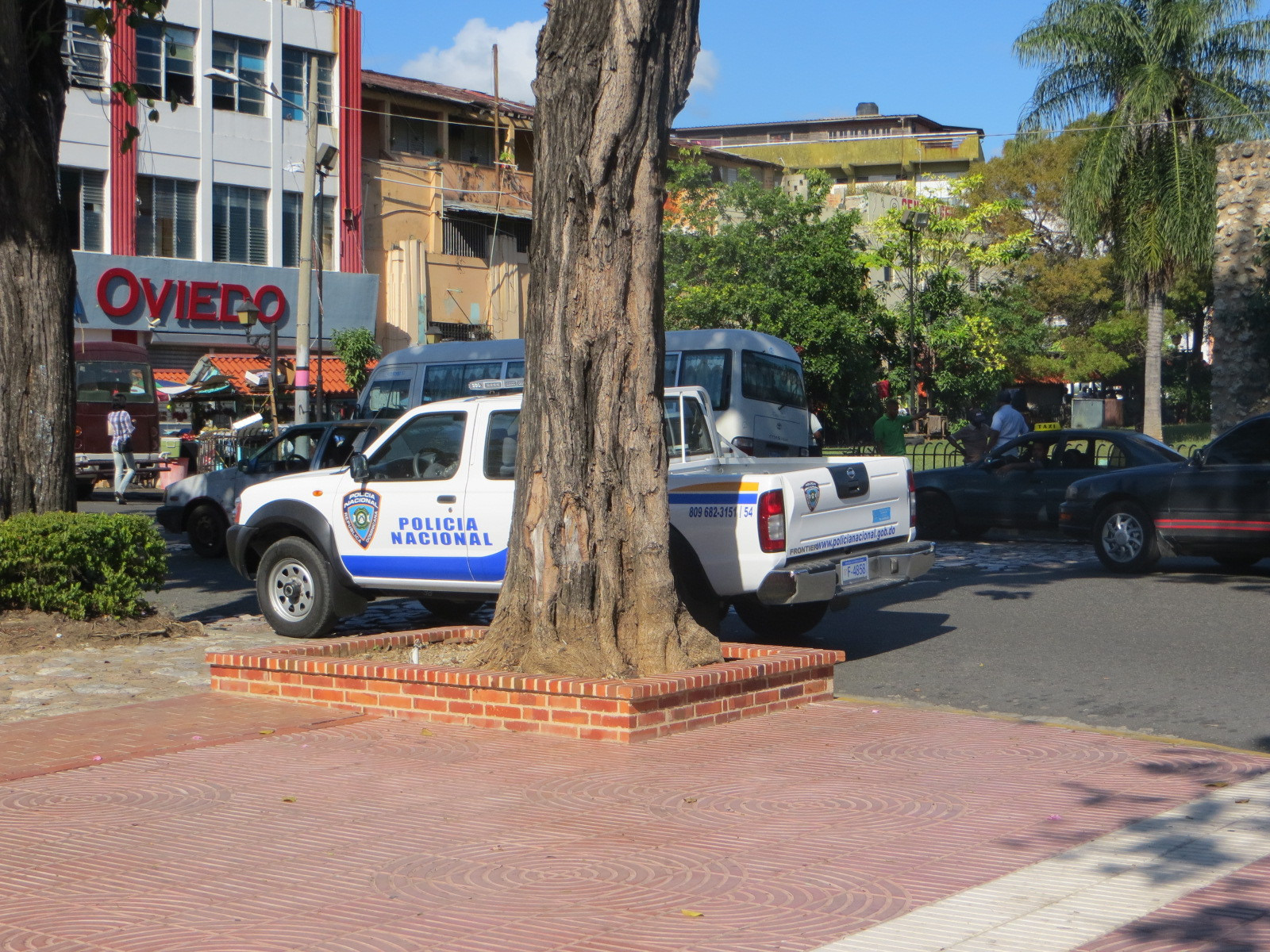
Dominican Republic police pick-up truck.

Crime in the Dominican Republic is investigated by the Dominican Republic National Police. In 2023 there were 1,237 recorded homicides (11.5 per 100,000), a drop of about 152 cases from the previous year. There were 34,293 robberies, averaging around 189 per day, and this was a 17% reduction compared to the same period in 2022. According to database Numbeo, the Crime Index (CI) in the Dominican Republic is 60.30, and the Safety Index (SI) is 39.70, indicating moderate to high crime concerns.

== Crime by type ==
=== Murder ===
As of September 2020, the Dominican Republic recorded 705 murders according to its Citizen Security Observatory, giving the country a projected annual total of 940 killings and a homicide rate of 9.0 per 100,000 (one of the lowest in the region). This continues the nation’s unbroken decrease in homicides since 2011, following 2019’s total of 1,026 homicides. As of 2025 the country's homicide rate was reported at about 8.3 per 100,000 people.

=== Illegal drug trade ===
The Dominican Republic has become a trans-shipment point for Colombian drugs destined to Europe as well as the United States and Canada. Money laundering via the Dominican Republic is favored by the drug cartels for the ease of illicit financial transactions. In 2004, it was estimated that 8% of all cocaine smuggled into the United States had come through the Dominican Republic. The Dominican Republic responded with increased efforts to seize drug shipments, arrest and extradite those involved, and combat money-laundering.

=== Robbery ===
Purse snatchers and briefcase thieves are known to work hotel bars and restaurants waiting for unknowing guests to place these items on chairs or under tables. Pools or beaches are attractive areas for thieves.

The most common type of crime are drive-by robberies that are normally performed by one or two assailants on a motorcycle, scooter, or even a bicycle. The assailant will drive up and grab anything that is in arm's reach: purses, cellular phones, necklaces, etc. In metropolitan Santo Domingo the majority of the motorcycle robberies occurred between 8pm and 11pm, with 85 percent of the motorcycles involved having two riders.

=== Kidnapping ===
There is a low risk of kidnapping in the Dominican Republic. Victims of reported cases include tourists, family members, and common citizens. Some victims have reported being abducted by men in police uniforms or similar clothing, and having been told that their identity needed to be verified. Kidnappers take victims to an undisclosed location and hold them from a few hours to a couple of days.

=== Terrorism ===
The U.S. Department of State has assessed Santo Domingo as being a LOW-threat location for terrorism directed at or affecting official U.S. government interests. There are no known organized domestic terrorist groups. Santo Domingo experienced its first incident of domestic terrorism in 2014, when a male ignited an incendiary device on a crowded subway car, killing one person and injuring dozens. The Dominican Republic is an integral part of the Caribbean, with several international airports. As such, it is a likely transit point for extremists from within the region, Africa, and Europe.

== By location ==
=== Santo Domingo ===
High crime areas in the capital include Arroyo Hondo, Naco, Gazcue, Cristo Rey, Los Mina and Villa Agricola.
