= Crime in Spain =

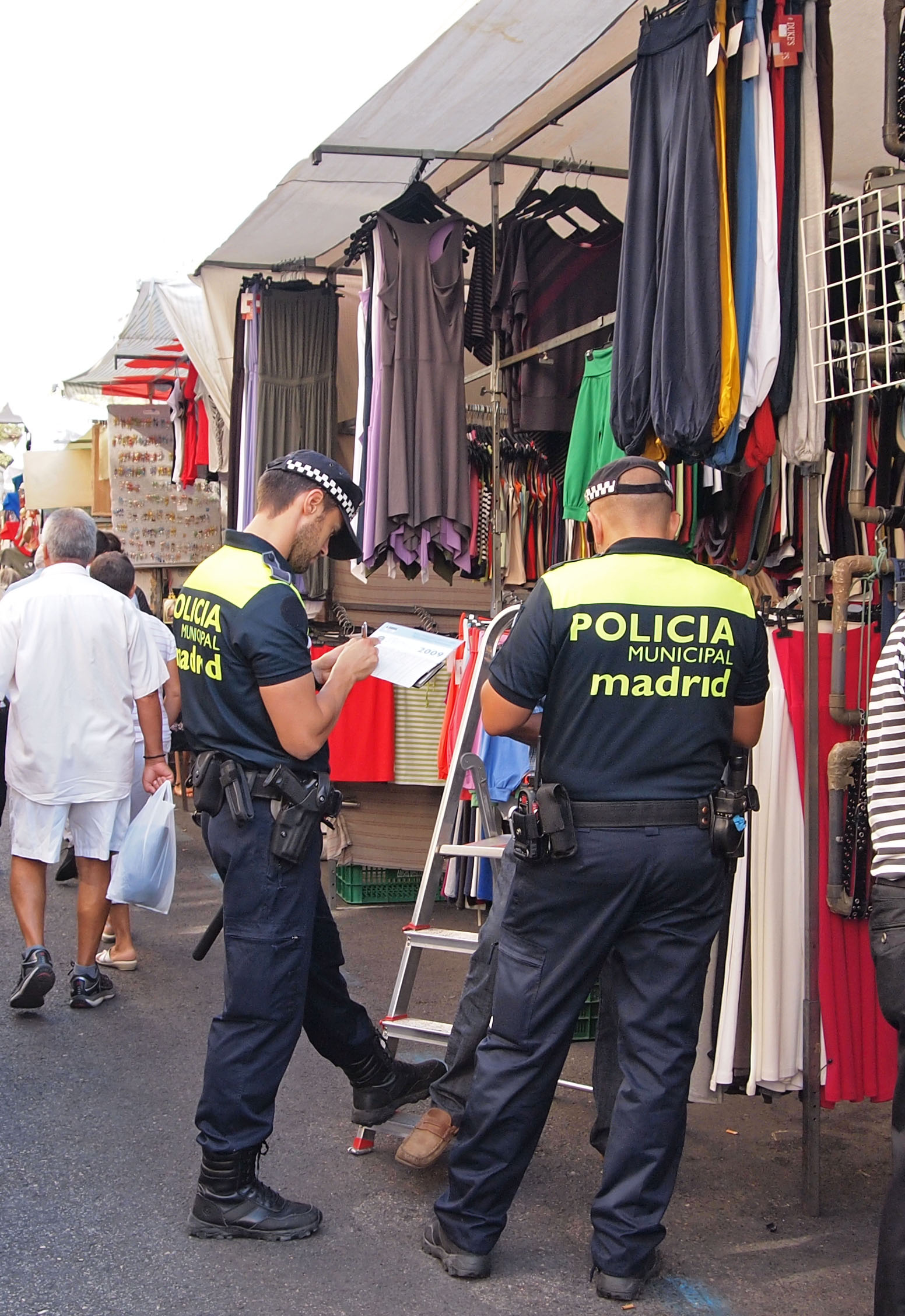
Municipal Police officers in Rastro market, Madrid.

Overall, rates of crime in Spain are relatively low in comparison to other European countries, with the notable exception of robberies. In 2022 it was listed as number two out of 35 states in Europe with regard to the number of police-recorded robberies relative to population size, although in 2020 it had a lower homicide rate than the European Union average.

== Crime by type ==
Crime in Spain
- Homicide: 0.7 (2024)
- Assault: 55.3 (2023)
- Burglary: 297.6 (2024)
- Theft: 457.5 (2024)
- Fraud: 1079.7 (2024)
- Corruption: 3.1 (2024)
- Bribery: 0.2 (2024)
- Money laundering: 1.7 (2024)
- Rape: 10.2 (2023)
- Sexual violence: 39.9 (2023)
- reported per 100,000 inhabitants

=== Theft ===
Instances of robbery are particularly widespread. As of 2020, Spain had the second highest recorded instances of theft in the EU. One of the often cited reasons for this is a deficient national law that states that theft of anything worth less than €400 ($459) is not a crime, but a misdemeanor. Additionally offenses for theft of anything valued less than 400 euro are not accumulated to result in more serious charges.

=== Homicide ===
In 2020, Spain had a homicide rate of 0.64 per 100,000 population, making it the 6th lowest among 30 European countries and lower than the European Union average of 0.9. There were a total of 298 homicides in Spain in 2020. Many terrorist attacks have occurred in Spain, the most deadly of which was the 2004 Madrid train bombings.

Asturias, in Northern Spain, has one of the countries' lowest crime rates. With a population of 1 million people, it registered only 1 homicide during 2021. Its biggest city, Gijón, with more than 250,000 inhabitants, has not registered a homicide since February 2020 (as of June 2022), before COVID-19 lockdown.

=== Drug-related crime ===
Spain is the principal route of entry of drugs and narcotics into the European Union. Indeed, about half of the cocaine found by law enforcement agencies in Europe is found by Spanish police. As of 2005, Spain had the highest rate of cocaine users in the world.

==== Cocaine importation ====
Cocaine usage in Spain is high by world standards. Spain is a major transit point for cocaine entering Europe. After arrival in Spain, much of the cocaine is then trafficked to other countries. In 2005, over 50% of the cocaine found by police in Europe was found by Spanish police. The so-called Galician mafia is the main trafficker of cocaine into Spain and to European countries such as the United Kingdom.

=== Background level of crime against tourists ===
The US Department of State's Bureau of Consular Affairs advised travellers in 2011 that Spain had a "moderate rate of crime". Street crimes against tourists occur in the principal tourist areas. Madrid and Barcelona, in particular, report incidents of "pick-pocketing, mugging, and occasional violent attacks". In Madrid, incidents have been reported in "all major tourist areas, including the area near the Prado Museum, near Atocha train station, in Retiro Park, in areas of old Madrid including near the Royal Palace, and in Plaza Mayor". In Barcelona, the largest number of incidents reported also occurred in major tourist areas.

In 2019, the Embassy of the United States in Spain issued a warning to its nationals against the increasing violent crime in Barcelona. The embassy highlighted crimes, which were recently committed in the most popular tourist places, such as, the theft of jewelry, money and watches. These offenses have physically harmed the victims in some cases.

=== Violence against women ===
Spain has specific a gender-based violence law with its own courts. In 20 years they have dealt with 2 million complaints and convicted 700,000 people.

Since 2003 the Spanish government has been counting gender violence murders, by December 2022 they had reached 1,183 murders. With an annual number between 43 (2021) and 76 (2008) murders a year.

=== Corruption ===
Corruption in Spain is a major concern, with Transparency International's 2013 Global Corruption Barometer showing that surveyed households consider political parties, Parliament, and the judiciary to be the most corrupt institutions. In fact, the Spanish population ranks corruption as their second-biggest problem, eclipsed only by unemployment. According to Politico, 1378 officials were prosecuted for corruption between July 2015 and September 2016.

== Crime statistics ==
Crime statistics for Spain are published annually by the Instituto Nacional de Estadística. Different agencies of Spain and the European Union conduct analysis of the crime data in Spain. Statistics show Spain is one of the European countries with the lowest crime rate, according to a 2005 Gallup Europe research study. The rate of misdemeanours and crimes in Spain was 46 per 1,000 people in 2009. In 2013 Spain had one of the lowest crime rates in Europe.

== See also ==
- Censorship in Spain
- Spain's law enforcement agencies
