= Crime in Trinidad and Tobago =

Crime in Trinidad and Tobago includes significant levels of gang violence, gun crime, and homicide, with trends increasing since the late 1990s. Approximately 605 people were murdered in 2022, the highest number ever recorded. In January 2018, Trinidad recorded 40 killings in the month and nearly 500 murders per year were recorded in 2017. In 2018 and in 2019, the number of murders exceeded 500 according to the official police statistics with 2019 recording the second highest number of murders in the country's history. This trend has continued into the current year as during the month of January and up to 13 February 2020, the country recorded over 67 murders.

Port of Spain and its immediate environs have a higher crime rate than any other part of Trinidad. Homicides countrywide rose from fewer than 50 in the 1980s, to 97 in 1998, then to 360 in 2006 (30 murders per 100,000 persons). It rose to approximately 529 in 2008 but decreased in the following years.

A common explanation is that the outbreak in murders is due to drugs and gang-related problems, especially in the depressed communities of East Port of Spain. Some researchers, while acknowledging the connections between gangs and violence in the area, argue that the role of illegal drugs has been overstated.

The police administration has responded by improving the working conditions of officers, increasing the use of forensic evidence and surveillance technology (CCTV cameras) as well as hiring overseas experts.

Reports of kidnappings for ransom which were on the rise a few years ago have declined dramatically since 2006. However, theft and violent crimes remain prevalent to this date, while crime and the perception of crime continues to hamper the economic prospects of the city.

Laventille has some of the highest crime rates in Trinidad and Tobago, with drugs, gangs, and murders being the main problem in this community.

On 3 March 2026, Trinidad and Tobago declared a new state of emergency in response to a wave of violent crime in the country.

== List of major crimes ==
- Jamaat al Muslimeen coup attempt (1990)
- Murder of Akiel Chambers (1998)
- Murder of Asami Nagakiya (2016)
- Murder of Claire Broadbridge (2017)

== See also ==
- Trinidad and Tobago Police Service
