= Crime in Saint Kitts and Nevis =

Crime in Saint Kitts and Nevis is considerably higher than many other parts of the world. In 2012 Saint Kitts and Nevis had a homicide rate of 33.6 per 100,000 citizens, the 8th highest in the world, and the 7th highest during the period from 2005 to 2014. As of 2011 Basseterre had the highest murder rate of any capital city in the world at 131.6 per 100,000 inhabitants (a total of 17 murders in the city that year).

Most violence and criminal activity in the country is believed to be gang and drug related.

== Context and History ==
Saint Kitts and Nevis gained its independence in 1983. In 2001 the country's homicide rate was at an all-time low with only 6 murders reported that year. Since then however there has been a rapid rise in homicides and other crimes. 2011 was the worst year for homicides in the country with 34 murders reported, giving the country a homicide rate of 67.6 per 100,000 citizens, at that time one of the top three in the world. Since 2011 measures and precautions have been placed by the government that have reduced the number of murders. The Saint Kitts government has also claimed that these measures more than halved crime during that period although this claim has been viewed skeptically by independent organizations.

Generally speaking the courts and police in Saint Kitts and Nevis are considered effective and corruption free, and the legal system is considered effective. However there is a lack of civilian oversight and interaction with the police department, as well as occasional reports of abuse perpetrated by the police. The biggest barrier to fighting crime is seen as the country's outdated prison system, with many, if not all, prisons old and overcrowded. Building new prisons and improving the relationships between the police and community are seen as the biggest improvements the government can make to combat crime.

=== Terrance Drew administration ===
As of December 21, 2023, Saint Kitts and Nevis has witnessed its second fatal shooting incident within three days, bringing the murder count for 2023 to 31. Marius Webbe of Pond Hill was found dead in his pigsty at Brown Hill with gunshot injuries. This incident follows the discovery of Glenville 'Short Boss' Syder's lifeless body on December 18, marking the 30th murder of the year. These incidents have raised concerns about the escalating violence in the region.

Prime Minister Dr. Terrance Drew, who has been in office for the last 17 months, faces the challenge of addressing and curbing this alarming trend. The murder count reflects a worrying upward trajectory, necessitating comprehensive efforts to ensure the safety and well-being of the citizens.

The discontinuation of the PEACE Programme by Prime Minister Drew’s administration has raised concerns for St. Kitts and Nevis' youth. Previously successful under Team Unity, the program led to a 50% crime reduction. However, since its abandonment, almost 21 young lives have been lost to violence, with a surge in robbery and violent crimes. Urgent calls from citizens demand the Drew administration to reinstate the PEACE Programme, mirroring its effective Team Unity model. The program's past success played a pivotal role in crime reduction and community safety.

== Effect on Tourism ==
Tourism plays a significant role in the Saint Kitts and Nevis economy, and despite the levels of crime tourists are not usually victims. A rare instance of tourists being targeted happened in 2010 when an elderly British couple were murdered in a courtyard.

== Role of Firearms in crime ==
Firearms have been increasingly used in crimes on Saint Kitts and Nevis. In 2003 only 63.6 percent of murders were gun-related, while in 2010 it had risen to 85 percent. The global average of firearm-related homicides is 42 percent.

== Drugs and gangs ==
Since the turn of the 21st century there has been an increase in gang and drug-related violence and crime. Cocaine especially is known to be frequently trafficked through the country, although the presence of the drug trade is considered relatively minor compared to other Caribbean and Latin American countries. Transnational gangs are not believed to operate in the country.

Most gang activities relate to drug trafficking as well as petty crime, robberies, and extortion. Many homicides and attempted homicides are believed to be drug and gang-related, many caused by rival factions fighting over turf.

A rivalry starting in 2008 is credited with the escalation of violence in the country. The Saint Kitts and Nevis government eventually arrested several gang leaders, one of which was later executed by hanging.

== BBC controversy ==
In 2015 Saint Kitts and Nevis was named by the BBC in a report as "the most violent place on earth". The BBC's report was widely criticized in Saint Kitts and Nevis for exaggerating the level of violence and crime in the country. The police department of Saint Kitts and Nevis released a report shortly afterwards stating that crime in the country had fallen 60% in the time period from 2011 and 2015, as well as the fact that visitors and tourists to Saint Kitts and Nevis are rarely targeted.
