= Crime in Paraguay =

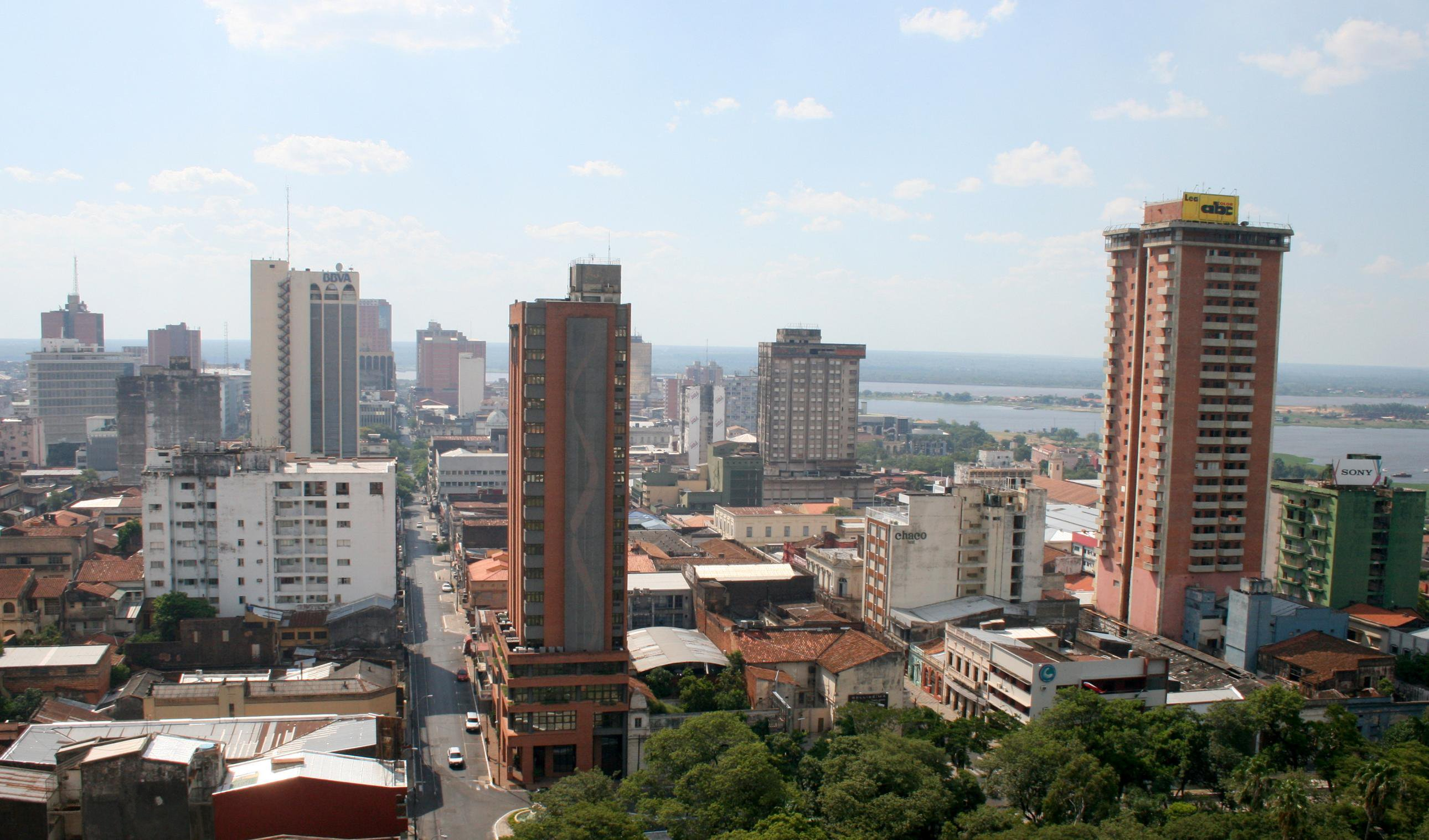
The center of historic Asunción.

Crime in Paraguay has increased in recent years with criminals often targeting those thought to be wealthy. Although most crime in Paraguay is nonviolent, there has been an increase in the use of weapons and there have been incidents where extreme violence has been used.

== Crime by type ==
=== Armed violence ===
The amount of gang violence and other forms of armed violence has increased since the 1954 Paraguayan coup d'état.

=== Cigarette smuggling ===
Due to discrepancies in the cigarette tax rate between Brazil and Paraguay (16% in Paraguay vs. 80% in Brazil), large quantities of cigarettes are smuggled into Brazil via Santa Catarina. Journalists have alleged that the Tabacalera Del Este factory owned by relatives of Paraguayan President Horacio Cartes, is responsible for producing cigarettes for the purpose of being smuggled into Brazil via Ciudad del Este.

=== Corruption ===
Observers maintain that corruption in Paraguay remains a major impediment to the emergence of stronger democratic institutions and sustainable economic development.

=== Domestic violence ===
In 2009, on average one woman was murdered in Paraguay every 10 days, or 11.2% of the overall homicide rate. However, it is not clear exactly how many women are killed in domestic violence situations. Although Paraguay has taken several measures to deal with this problem, including creating special police units for domestic violence victims, lack of adequate laws, as well as conservative attitudes within a male dominated society hinder progress.

=== Illegal drug trade ===
The illegal drug trade in Paraguay is significant in both production of cannabis and trans-shipment of cocaine. In 2011 the United Nations reported that it was the largest cannabis producer in South America, accounting for 15 per cent of world cannabis production. It was also responsible for 30-40 tons of cocaine trans-shipment annually.

=== Murder ===
In 2012, Paraguay had a murder rate of 9.7 per 100,000 population. There were a total of 649 murders in Paraguay in 2012. In 2015, this had decreased to a rate of 9.29 per 100,000, with 617 murders recorded. In 2012, 11.2% of victims were female, while male victims constituted 88.8% respectively. In 2018, Paraguay's homicide rate saw a further reduction to 5.1 per 100,000.

=== Robbery ===
Armed robbery, carjackings, car theft, and home invasions are a problem in both urban and rural areas. Street crime including pick pocketing and mugging is prevalent in cities.

As of 2008, the number of pick pocketing incidents and armed assaults was increasing on public buses and in the downtown area of Asunción. There have been incidents of pilferage from checked baggage at both airports and bus terminals. Unauthorized ticket vendors also reportedly operate at the Asuncion bus terminal, badgering travelers into buying tickets for substandard or non-existent services.
