= Crime in Cape Verde =

- Homicide: 7.0 (2020)
- Assault: 587.2 (2018)
- Burglary: 951.9 (2018)
- Theft: 667.9 (2018)
- Rape: 20.7 (2015)
- Sexual violence: 31.0 (2018)
- reported per 100,000 inhabitants

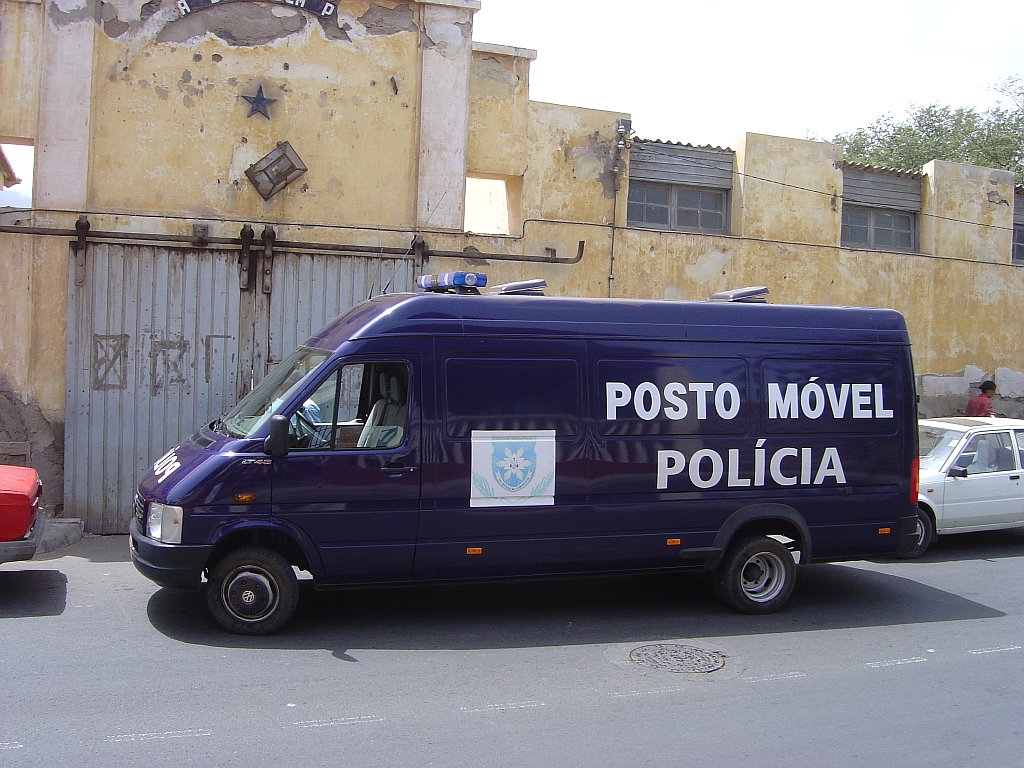
Parked Cape Verde Police car.

Petty theft and burglary are common in Cape Verde, especially in crowded areas, such as market places, festivals, and celebrations. Often the perpetrators of these crimes are gangs of street children. As of 2008, local police statistics reflect an increase in crime in Cape Verde, particularly in the cities of Praia and Mindelo.

As of 2008, muggings occur more often than previously, particularly at night and in more isolated areas, and occasionally violence is associated with them. Crime associated with drugs and drug-use is also on the rise. Due to lack of lighting in many public areas and periodic blackouts, the U.S. government has advised travelers to carry small flashlights, travel with others, keep vehicle doors and windows locked, avoid dark and isolated places, and be especially vigilant in the evenings.

Violent crime is also increasing in Cape Verde as of 2008. There were several murders and attempted murders between May 2007 and May 2008, mostly reported in the urban centers of Praia and Mindelo, although Sal and other islands have not been immune. Allegedly the US has been deporting criminals of Cape Verdean nationality back to their country of origin and gang warfare has begun between the deportees as they are rivals for local distribution and onward transport of illegal drugs coming principally from South America.

Cape Verde is known as a transit site of child trafficking and illicit drugs, such as cannabis and cocaine. Because of its strategic location between South America and Africa, and its proximity to Europe, cocaine is often smuggled through Cape Verde by South American and West African crime groups.

== See also ==
- Cape Verdean organized crime
