= Crime in the United Arab Emirates =

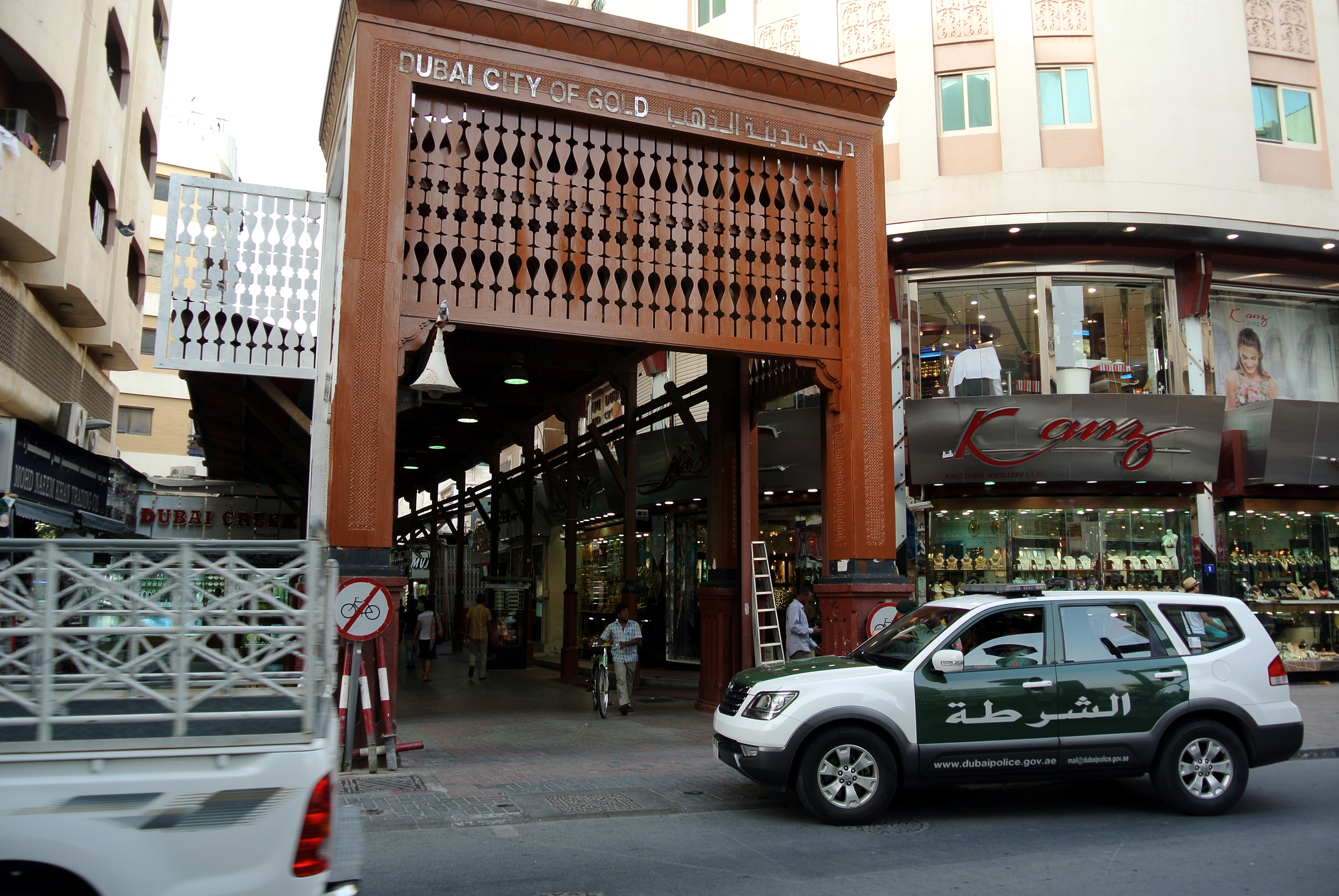
UAE police vehicle

The crime rate in the United Arab Emirates is relatively moderate compared to more highly industrialized nations. Incidents of petty crime such as pickpocketing are low. The United States Department of State states: "Crime generally is not a problem for travelers in the UAE. However, the U.S. Embassy advises U.S. citizens to take normal precautions against theft, such as not leaving a wallet, purse, or credit card unattended. Although vehicle break-ins in the UAE are rare, U.S. citizens are encouraged to ensure that unattended vehicles are locked and that valuables are not left out in plain sight".

== Terrorism ==
The United Arab Emirates has been listed as a place used by investors to raise funds to support militants. Businesses based in the UAE have been implicated in the funding of the Taliban and the Haqqani network. In January 2022, a terrorist attack against three oil tanker trucks and an under construction airport extension infrastructure occurred in Abu Dhabi. The attack was conducted by the Houthi movement and killed 3 civilians.

== Cybercrime ==
Incidents of cybercrime are increasing. In 2002, there was a 300% rise in computer hacking within six months. According to experts, the United Arab Emirates is among the top ten countries which are most vulnerable to attack by hackers. White-collar crime includes embezzlement of funds, fraud and bribery.

== Drugs ==
The UAE is a drug transshipment country for traffickers due to its proximity to Southwest Asian drug producing nations. Drug trafficking is a major form of crime in the UAE, and the nation has a zero tolerance policy towards illegal drug use. Possession of the smallest amount of illegal drugs is punishable by a minimum of four years' imprisonment and a maximum punishment of death.

A drug trafficking “supercartel” run by Edin “Tito” Gacanin of Bosnia and Herzegovina, was found operating via Durban and having headquarters in Dubai. He is a wanted criminal in the Netherlands, of which he holds a passport. On 12 January 2021, a container ship carrying 739.5 kilos of cocaine from Durban was caught in Rotterdam in the Netherlands. In November 2022, Gacanin was arrested in Dubai as a prime suspect in organising, brokering and financing the cocaine consignment from Durban. The Netherlands government raised an extradition requested for Gacanin. However, the Dubai authorities released him from custody two months after the arrest. The US described Gacanin as “one of the world’s most prolific drug traffickers” and imposed sanctions against him. The US Treasury also stated that Gacanin’s cartel is involved in money laundering and has close ties with the Kinahan Organised Crime Group, another drug cartel residing and running operations from Dubai.

== Money laundering ==
The UAE is vulnerable to money laundering due to its position as a major commercial driver in the region. The UAE leadership has taken several measures for combating organized crime. A law was enacted in January 2002 for the purpose of curbing money laundering. However, despite government efforts to combat money laundering, regulation of banking is still developing.

Washington-based Center for Advanced Defense Studies released a report that US sanctioned war profiteers, terror-funders and drug traffickers have been long-using Dubai's real-estate market as a money-laundering haven.

In a report published in April 2020, the Financial Action Task Force (FATF) questioned the UAE’s system despite what it called “significant steps” to strengthen regulations, including new legislation in 2018 and 2019. In its 2020 assessment, FATF called the Emirates' limited money laundering prosecutions a “concern” and urged the country to strengthen its measures. In November 2021, the UAE submitted a report to FATF, but the country failed to achieve a number of thresholds. On 4 March 2022, FATF placed the UAE in its grey list of countries subject to increased monitoring, due to the shortcomings in addressing the issue of money laundering and terror financing. The organization said that the Emirates made “significant progress” in enhancing its systems, but there was still a need for improvements in several areas.

On 16 March 2023, the EU added the UAE to its blacklist of high-risk third countries, over deficiencies in anti-money laundering and funding of terrorism regimes. The FATF removed the UAE from anti-money laundering “grey list” on 23 February 2024. However, the EU continued keeping the UAE on its blacklist, which led the Emirates to question the decision in January 2025. The UAE Economy Minister Abdulla bin Touq Al Marri criticized the EU, stating that it can’t dictate other countries about their labour systems, and that “what works in the UAE works.” On 9 July 2025, the European Parliament voted not to oppose the European Commission's decision to remove the United Arab Emirates (UAE) from its list of high risk third countries with strategic deficiencies in their anti-money-laundering (AML) and counter terrorism-financing (CTF) frameworks, ending the episode.

== Murder ==
According to the Global Study on Homicide, United Nations Office on Drugs and Crime (UNODC), the homicide rate in the UAE in 2012 was 2.6 per 100,000. The average global homicide rate for that period was 6.3 per 100,000 population.

== Human trafficking ==
Porous borders and proximity to war-affected countries like Iraq increase the problem of human trafficking into the UAE. Trafficking into the country is generally of young boys and women. The most usual purpose of such trafficking is involuntary servitude, employment in deceptively undeclared adverse and abusive conditions, and sexual exploitation.

=== Involuntary servitude and abusive labor conditions ===
In 2006, young boys continued to be trafficked into the country for the purpose of being used as camel jockeys. There were many camel jockeys working in the UAE under inhumane conditions; a program to gradually replace exploited child jockeys with robot jockeys was initiated.

The number of human trafficking cases officially notified in the UAE has been falling. In the first half of 2014, reports of three cases of human trafficking were received by the Dubai Foundation for Women and Children (DFWAC) compared to 12 in the same period of 2013.

A report from the US Department of State into Trafficking in Persons: UAE in 2021, concludes that violations of Emirati labor laws in which signs of human trafficking were present, were not routinely investigated by authorities, and "efforts to identify ... forced labor victims and male victims, remained weak and data collection remained insufficient." The report also noted: "The government did not report convicting any labor traffickers during the reporting period and historically has not reported any forced labor convictions."

=== Sexual exploitation ===
According to the United States Department of State's 2021 report into Trafficking in Persons: UAE, the country's most recent annual statistics were prosecutions in nineteen sex trafficking cases, compared to thirty-eight in the year before:

...during the reporting year the government prosecuted 54 individuals in 19 sex trafficking cases, zero individuals for forced labor crimes, and three individuals in one child forced begging case across the seven emirates, compared with 67 individuals in 38 sex trafficking cases the year prior. Officials reported conviction of 15 sex traffickers and administered sentences ranging from one to seven years' imprisonment, with the vast majority of perpetrators receiving three years or more with additional fines and subsequent deportation at the conclusion of sentences. During the previous year, the government convicted 33 sex trafficking defendants under trafficking laws and handed down similar punishments.

Women trafficked into the country for sexual exploitation were reported, in 2007, as being trafficked from: Syria, Iraq, Russia, Azerbaijan, Uzbekistan, Kyrgyzstan, Kazakhstan, Romania, Moldova and its disputed constituent Transnistria, Ukraine, Ethiopia, Somalia, Uganda, Morocco, India, the People's Republic of China, the Philippines, Iran and Pakistan.

== See also ==
- Sex trafficking in Dubai
