= Crime in Israel =

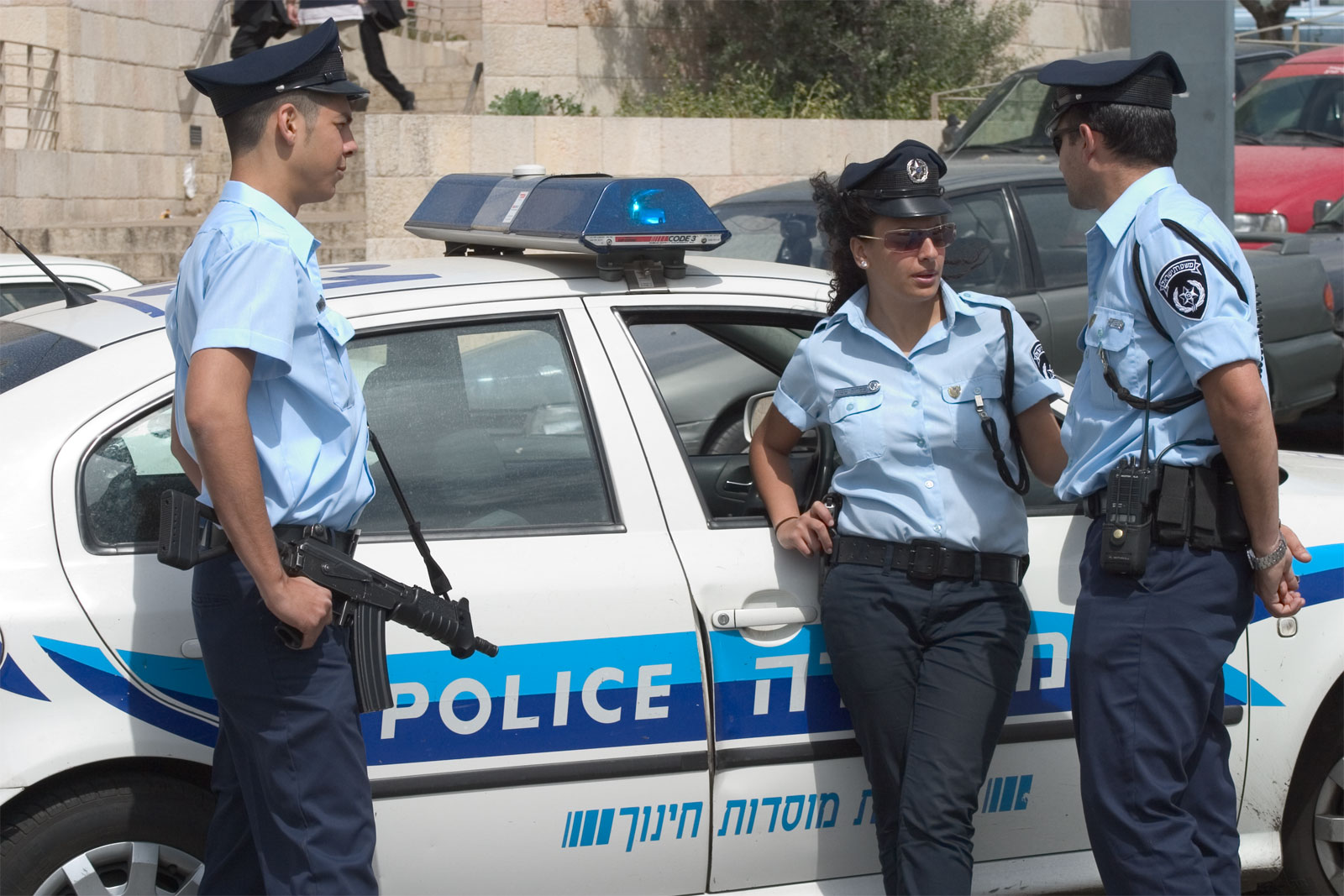
Israeli police officers

Crime in Israel is present in various forms. According to the Israel Police, the general crime rate dropped in 2020, while cyber crimes, hate crimes, domestic violence and sexual abuse incidents rose.

== Homicide ==
In Israel the homicide rate is relatively low: in 2015, there were 2.4 people killed per 100,000 inhabitants (in Switzerland the number is 0.71, in Russia it is 14.9, in South Africa it is 34, in Venezuela it is 49). In 2009, 135 people were murdered in Israel.

Six Israeli women were killed by partners in 2021. Of the victims, 3 were Arab-Israeli, compared to 9 Arab-Israeli women out of a total of 11 women killed by partners in 2009.

According to Israel's police, the number of murders is continually decreasing. In 2018, 103 people were the victims of homicide, compared with 136 people in 2017. The murder rate in 2018 was 1.14 people per 100,000 inhabitants.

The Arab community in Israel has seen a significant increase in violence and organized crime, including a rise in gang-related murders in recent years. A report by the Abraham Initiative highlighted that 244 Arab community members were killed in Israel in 2023, more than double the previous year's count. The report attributed this surge in homicides directly to National Security Minister Itamar Ben Gvir, who campaigned on a platform promising to improve personal security and oversee law enforcement. Prominent organized crime families among Israeli Arabs include Al-Hariri, Bakri, Jarushis, and the Druze Abu Latifs.

== Hate crimes ==
Racist incidents, including violence, continue taking place between the Jewish majority and Arab minority.

In September 2007, eight white supremacists sporting tattoos including the number 88 (code for "Heil Hitler" because "H" is the eighth letter of the alphabet) from Petah Tikva were arrested after a year of being observed desecrating synagogues, giving Nazi salutes in the street, attacking religious Jews, collecting weapons explosives and spreading Nazi propaganda and making a video. They were immigrants from Russia, and only one was fully Jewish. The rest had been allowed to immigrate due to some Jewish ancestry, but were not fully Jewish.

According to Palestinian officials, between 2005 and 2015, there were 11,000 attacks on Palestinians by Jews in the West Bank and in east Jerusalem, including price tag attacks. Between 2010 and 2015, three Palestinians were killed in arson attacks. Arson attacks on property were reported for 15 individual houses, 20 mosques and four churches. In first four months of 2018, there were 13 cases of hate crimes carried out by ultra-nationalists against Palestinians.

== Property crimes ==
Director of the Latin American Institute of the American Jewish Committee in Washington, D.C. Dina Siegel, criminology professor H. G. van de Bunt, and lecturer in criminology Damián Zaitch showed in their book Global Organized Crime that a significant amount of crime in Israel, especially property crime, is committed by the residents of the Palestinian National Authority (PNA or PA).

Motor vehicle theft is a major crime committed by Palestinians. Since the early 1990s, there has been an increase in the rate of robberies in Israel. Between 1994 and 2001, the rate of robberies increased from 14.0 to 30.6 cases per 100,000 population. The reason behind this increase in robberies is analyzed as a result of the establishment of the Palestinian Authority in the West Bank and Gaza Strip which according to the book Global Organized Crime "serves as a safe haven for Palestinian offenders". However, the organized crime industry associated with motor vehicle theft involves not only Palestinians, but also Israeli citizens, both Jewish and Arab. The parts of the stolen cars are removed in "chop shops" in the Palestinian territories and then these vehicles are sold in the black market in Israel. Media reports suggest some of these vehicles are even handed over to high-ranking Palestinian Authority officials. It was reported that since the beginning of 2010 through the end of February 2010, the Palestinian Authority police had destroyed 910 stolen cars.

Although Palestinian criminals are involved in organized crime in the country, Siegel et al. suggested one should not conclude that "organized crime in Israel is dominated by Palestinians. Organized crime committed by Jews or other non-Palestinians has been part of the Israeli crime scene for many years".

== Organized crime ==
Organized crime has increased dramatically in Israel since the 1990s and is described by the BBC and the Israeli Police as a "booming industry". The Israeli organised crime groups have extended their activities in foreign countries like the United States, South Africa, and the Netherlands. According to a report by the Israel Police, drug trafficking, trafficking of women for the purpose of commercial sexual exploitation, illicit gambling, pirate filling stations and real estate are the major forms of crime in the country.

In 2002, the Israel Police documented 464,854 criminal files and non-prosecution cases while the number was 484,688 in 2003. This was an increase of 4.5% over 2002.

Israeli police, according to a Channel 12 report, have claimed there is a conflict of interest between themselves and the Shin Bet when it comes to cracking down on illegal arms and crime in Arab society. The latter works in terms of a mission of "national security" and provides immunity to figures in organized crime who are prepared to act as informants.

== Arms trafficking ==
Arms trafficking is another form of crime and it is directly associated with terrorism. There are many links between Israeli and Palestinian gangsters that facilitate these ventures.

== Juvenile crime ==
Violence against minors is also a problem in Israel. In 1999, approximately 7,000 cases of crimes against minors were documented which included physical assault (54%), molestation (37%) and repeated physical victimization (9%). However, Israeli minors are not solely the victims of crime, they are also sometimes the perpetrators. Teenage violence in schools is a problem in Israel; the first major study on teenage crime in the nation by T. Horowitz and M. Amir in 1981 indicated three major forms of violence in Israeli schools: theft, breaking and entering, and vandalism. Studies have suggested that Israeli Arab youth are more violent than Jews in the country, a fact which academics attribute to cultural, social, and economic differences.

== Sexual offenses against minors ==
According to the 2017 statistical yearbook published by the National Council for the Child, there were 2,514 reported sexual crimes against minors in 2016, leading to 481 indictments. Of the 1,900 sex offenders incarcerated in 2009, approximately 60% had committed acts against children under the age of 13. Israel maintains a sex offender registry that is utilized by law enforcement and other authorized entities.

Advocacy groups have expressed concerns that a lack of background checks for immigration could potentially make Israel a refuge for individuals accused of sexual offenses. According to Jewish Community Watch, between 2014 and 2020, at least 60 Americans accused of sexually abusing children reportedly fled to Israel from the United States.

According to an Israeli pedophile monitoring association in 2020, tens of thousands of pedophiles operate in Israel every year, leading to about 100,000 victims annually.

The Association of Rape Crisis Centers in Israel received 17,484 new complaints of incidents of sex offenses in 2023, but just 6,405 cases of sex offenses and sexual harassment were opened by police. The head of ARCCI said “Closure rates of over 80% of sexual offense cases indicate a systematic and ongoing failure of the system.” Just 41% of complaints received were about offenses against those over 18, 28% were against girls and boys aged 12 and under, and 31% were against those between ages 13 and 18 (59% were minors). The most common type of offense ARCCI complaints were made about was incest, representing 36% of all complaints. When looking at complaints made about crimes against children, 70% were about incest.

Orit Sulitzeanu, director of ARCCI, told the committee that in the year 2023 there were 133 complaints made about alleged sexual crimes committed by police officers, and two-thirds of those were closed without any investigation, while 91% were closed without an indictment. The ages of the victims of police officers were not revealed to the public.

== Prisons and prison population ==
According to World Prison Brief, the total prison population of Israel number 19,756 (as of December 2023) with a rate of 217 per 100,000 population. 2.3% of prisoners were minors (as of 2017), and 38.9% of prisoners were foreigners (as of 2014).

== See also ==
- Jewish terrorism
- Palestinian terrorism
