= Crime in Oman =

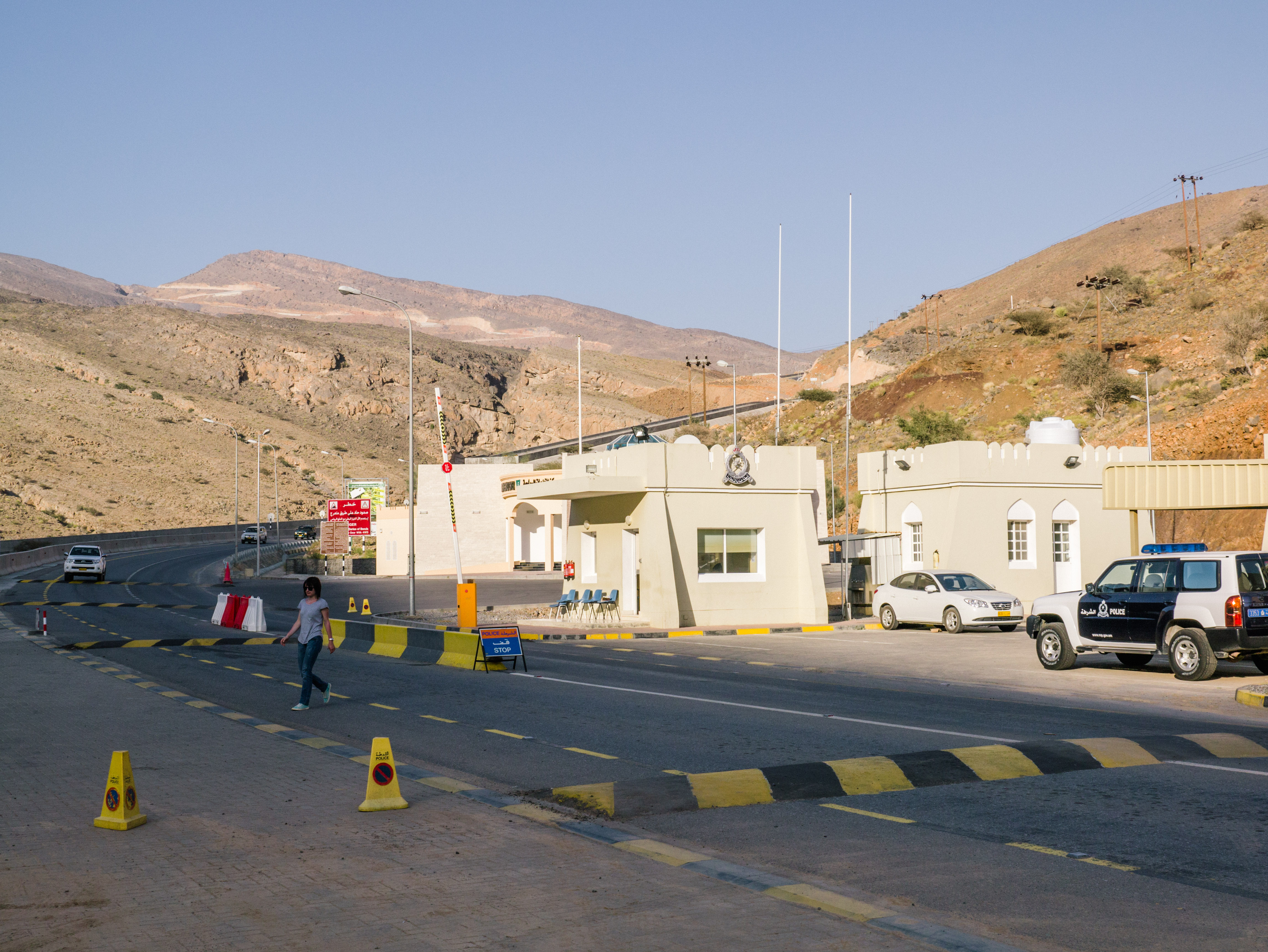
Police checkpoint in Jebel Akhdar

The crime rate in Oman is low compared to other industrialized countries. Incidents of serious crime are rare in the country. Incidents of petty crime are occasionally reported, including burglary and theft of property of foreign tourists. The Foreign and Commonwealth Office (FCO) describes the law and order situation in Oman as "generally good". Incidence of street crime is low. Violent crime occurs, but is extremely low compared to the rest of the Middle East.

== Targeting immigrants ==
Oman is a destination point for men and women mainly from South Asian nations like Bangladesh, India, Sri Lanka and Pakistan who migrate willingly, but some of whom become victims of trafficking when subjected to conditions of involuntary servitude as domestic workers and laborers. Mistreatment includes non-payment of wages, restrictions on movement and withholding of passports, threats, and physical or sexual abuse. Oman is also a destination point for women trafficked from Asia, Eastern Europe and North Africa for the purpose of commercial sexual exploitation.

== Impersonating health officials ==
The Department of Foreign Affairs and Trade (DFAT) of the Government of Australia and the FCO reported there are incidents where individuals presenting themselves as employees of the Ministry of Health have called private houses offering vaccinations against avian influenza (commonly known as Bird flu). But the Ministry of Health does not provide any service like this. Drugs are given to people as "vaccines" to make them unconscious and then they are robbed.

== Terrorism ==
On July 15, 2024, three Islamic State (IS) gunmen opened fire at the Shia Imam Ali Mosque in OMAN'S Wadi Kabir district, marking the first incident of terrorism attack in Oman’s history. The threat of terrorism in Oman was one of the lowest in the world, before 2024. The Institute for Economics and Peace ranks the impact of terrorism in Oman as "0" on the Global Terrorism Index (meaning no impact of terrorism), Oman is the only Persian Gulf or Middle East country to rank as such. Uncovered Al-Qaeda and Islamic State of Iraq and the Levant reports also make no reference to any successful recruitment in Oman.

== Drug trafficking ==
Cannabis is illegal in Oman. Nevertheless Oman is a transit country for cannabis coming from Afghanistan, Pakistan, and Iran.

Drug trafficking in general is low. However the amount of seized heroin in 1995 was 6.2 kg which was an increase compared to 1 kg in 1994. Oman has established an Inter-ministerial committee for the purpose of overseeing drug framework matters. The country has a well-organized Drug Control Unit to deal with drug trafficking. Oman is a party of the Convention on Psychotropic Substances (1971).

== Interpol data ==
According to Interpol data, criminal homicide rate in Oman decreased from 0.94 to 0.91 per 100,000 population between 1995 and 2000. It was a decrease of 3.2%. The rate of rape also decreased by 16.4%. But rate of robbery increased by 108.1%. While the rate of robbery was 1.24 per 100,000 population in 1995, it increased to 2.58 per 100,000 population in 2000. Similarly the rate of aggravated assault, burglary, larceny and motor vehicle theft increased by 10.7%, 57.7%, 317.8% and 112.2% respectively.
