= Crime in Guyana =

Crime in Guyana includes all violent and non-violent crimes that take place in the country. As of 2020, Guyana had a relatively high crime rate in the Americas.

== Crime by type ==
=== Murder ===
In the 20th century, Guyana had one of the highest crime rates in the world, although many crimes at the time were largely undocumented—mostly due to the country's lack of infrastructure. The chart below shows the Guyanese homicide rate from 1990 until 2020, where Guyana reported a peak intentional homicide rate of 28 murders per 100,000 in 2003 and a low of 10 murders per 100,000 in 2000. The 20 murders per 100,000 reported in 2020, was the fourth highest murder rate in South America and the sixth highest in the CARICOM.

=== Domestic violence ===
Domestic violence is a problem in all regions of Guyana. Enforcement of the domestic violence laws is especially weak in the interior, where police do not have as strong a presence and courts meet only once a quarter.

NGOs report a widespread perception that some police officers and magistrates could be bribed to make cases of domestic violence "go away." The government also does not prosecute cases in which the alleged victim or victim's family agreed to drop the case in exchange for a monetary payment out of court. NGOs assert the need for a specialized Family Court.

=== Robbery ===
Armed robberies occur regularly, especially in businesses and shopping districts, especially in the capital Georgetown. Nationally, there were 512 robberies under arms during the period January to October 2012 (a 15% increase from 2011).

=== Drug-related ===
On 10 April 2025, a member of the Guyana Police Force, 31-year-old Sherman Ferguson, was arrested after being found in possession of approximately 34.6 kg (over 70 pounds) of suspected cannabis. The arrest occurred during an intelligence-led operation along the Linden-Soesdyke Highway. Police intercepted the vehicle near Hauraruni and discovered the drugs in the trunk, and Ferguson was taken into custody.

== By location ==
=== Georgetown ===
In Georgetown, high crime areas include Tiger Bay, Albouystown, Sophia, all of south Georgetown, Buxton and Agricola. Robberies are a daily occurrence in the Stabroek Market area. A number of assaults have taken place in the Botanic Gardens.

=== Buxton ===
On 4 April 2025, police responding to a domestic violence report in Buxton, East Coast Demerara, discovered 880 rounds of .22 ammunition at a residence on Library Road. The home belonged to a 26-year-old security officer, who was not present during the search. His 22-year-old wife, also a security officer, was at the scene. The ammunition was collected and processed by the Vigilance Police Station.
