= Crime in Bolivia =

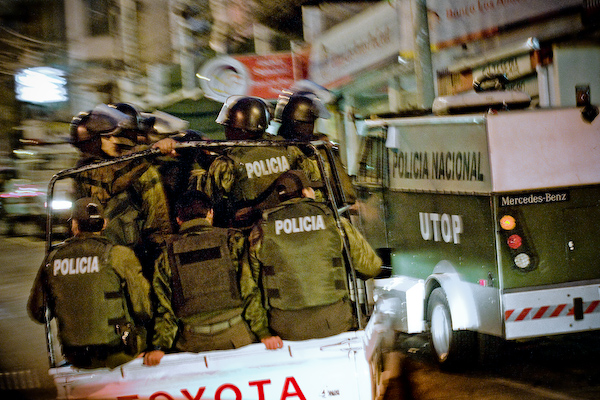
Bolivian police in La Paz.

Crime in Bolivia is investigated by the Bolivian police.

== Crime by type ==
=== Murder ===
Bolivia has a homicide rate of 6.3 murders per 100,000 people. There were 686 reported homicides in 2016. In 2012, Bolivia had a murder rate of 12.1 per 100,000 population. There were a total of 1,270 murders in Bolivia in 2012.

=== Illegal drug trade ===
The Bolivian government has since 2004 implemented a policy of voluntary participation of farmers from all coca-growing regions in Bolivia. For instance, farmers in Chapare are allowed to grow one cato of coca per year. Any coca grown beyond that limit, or any cultivation outside of approved coca-cultivation regions such as Chapare, is subject to elimination. The strategy relies on coca growers federations’ ability to enforce the agreement. Such federations are influential, and penalties for violations by farmers or lax enforcement by federations can be stern (including seizure of lands). As a result, coca cultivation in Bolivia fell to 27,200 hectares in 2011 from 31,000 hectares in 2010 - a 12 per cent decrease.

=== Domestic violence ===
Domestic violence is a serious and underreported problem. According to the Center for the Women’s Information and Development (CIDEM) and Emancipation Fund study, the number of reported domestic violence cases increased by 37% between 2007 and 2011. A study by the Pan American Health Organization conducted in 12 Latin American countries found the highest prevalence of domestic violence against women to be in Bolivia.
