= Crime in Northern Ireland =

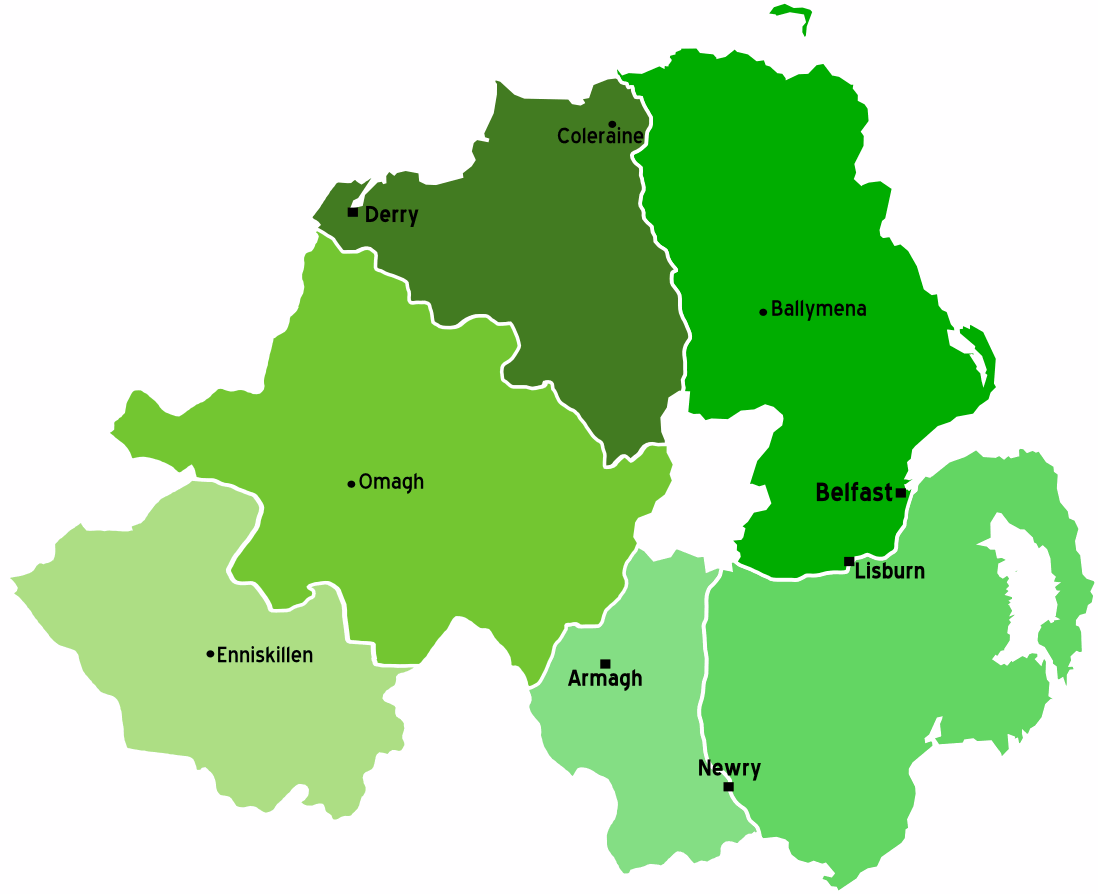
Northern Ireland

In Northern Ireland before the Troubles ended, low-level petty crime was not as common as in the rest of Ireland or the UK.

Since the Good Friday Agreement was signed in 1998, there have been more low-level crimes being committed, although statistics show that some places in Northern Ireland (outside of Belfast) have some of the lowest crime rates in Western Europe.

== Crime by type ==
The type of crime committed in Northern Ireland varies although robbery, murder, extortion, burglary, joyriding, terrorism, and assault have been noted. There has also been an increase in rural-related crime in recent years.

In recent times tiger kidnapping has been used in robberies on banks, shops, and post offices.

=== Murder ===
From 2011 to 2014, the homicide rate in Northern Ireland was 0.9 per 100 000 people per year. This is a similar figure to the UK, Republic of Ireland, and most Western European nations, and is among the lowest homicide rates globally.

During the Troubles, homicide rates were considerably higher: at their height in 1972 there were 479 deaths caused either by terrorism or Security Forces' action – around 31 per 100 000, similar to homicide rates in 2010s Colombia or South Africa. During the period 1976–1993, most years saw 60–100 deaths related to The Troubles, or around 4–6.5 per 100 000 each year.

Although there are repeated terrorism-related attempts at murder, few succeed. Since the establishment of devolved government in 2007, two soldiers and one police officer were murdered in 2009 and one police officer was murdered in 2011. Other incidents have seen life-changing injuries to police officers caused by explosions.

=== Terrorism ===
Since the historic signing of the Good Friday Agreement, most large terrorist groups and some smaller ones have since decommissioned their weapons or ceased military operations. These groups include the Provisional Irish Republican Army (PIRA), Ulster Volunteer Force, Loyalist Volunteer Force, Ulster Defence Association and Irish National Liberation Army.

Even though the larger organisations have been disbanded and are complying with the terms of the 1998 Agreement, there are still dissident republicans who oppose the Good Friday Agreement. These groups are low in number and pose a minor threat. An example of an attack was in March 2009, when two soldiers were killed in County Antrim while collecting a pizza just outside the barracks. The Real Irish Republican Army later claimed responsibility for the shooting.

Two days later another group called the Continuity Irish Republican Army shot and killed a police officer in Craigavon, County Armagh. The officer was responding to a call from a woman in the area when he was shot in the back of the head by a sniper.

More recently a large number of bombs have been discovered in counties Londonderry, Armagh and Tyrone. Although none of the devices detonated, the police and British Army said they were getting more "sophisticated". In February 2008 the Army defused a 45 kg device in County Down and, in September 2009, a 270 kg device.

On Friday 16 October 2009, around 06:30 UTC, a car bomb exploded under the car of a police officer's wife in the large Unionist area of east Belfast and what is considered to be an area controlled by the Ulster Defence Association. The device was intended to kill her husband whom she usually drives to work but was not present in the car at the time. The woman escaped with minor injuries as the bomb detonated under the passenger side seat. The Real IRA claimed responsibility for this incident.

==== Bomb alerts ====
Between 2007 and 2009, there were on average seven Hoax Bomb Alerts each week, but some alerts are genuine. They are so common that there is a permanent Bomb Disposal team of the British Army stationed in Northern Ireland. The main areas are County Londonderry, County Down, County Antrim and Belfast.

Due to the threat posed to the society in Northern Ireland, all objects have to be treated with suspicion and controlled explosions are common in some areas.

On 14 October 2009, the Police Service of Northern Ireland received a call stating that a 270 kg bomb had been left in a van abandoned on a bridge in a village in County Tyrone. The British Army carried out a controlled explosion on the device which turned out to be a hoax.

A British newspaper recently published an article that said, "Republican bomb alerts total 750 in two years" which is an average of 7.21 a week or just over one a day.

=== Intimidation of Romani people ===
With new countries joining the European Union and the freedom of movement of people within the union, there has been an influx of people from countries such as, Lithuania, Poland, Romania, and surrounding countries.

In June 2009, around 100 Romani people from Romania had to be moved to safer houses because their windows had been smashed and racist graffiti dubbed on their houses in a Loyalist area of south Belfast.

=== Theft ===
The theft of ATMs in recent years is on the rise. It is not known whether paramilitary groups or organised crime groups are committing the crimes. The theft of such a machine in Northern Ireland involves pulling the ATM from the wall, usually with a large digger, then putting it in a waiting vehicle (usually a dump truck).

The BBC reported on 21 October 2009 that three such incidents had occurred in one week, all involving a digger.

In November 2009, after a 'smash and grab' incident in Dungannon, County Tyrone, the Irish News newspaper released an article that revealed that there had been 13 incidents since March 2009 in Northern Ireland. Inflation rises in 2023 made farming equipment in particular an attractive target for organised gangs and meant that each theft cost the rural community more than in previous years.
