= Roseau River =

There are several rivers called the Roseau River:

- Roseau River (Dominica), in Dominica
- Roseau River (Manitoba–Minnesota), in the Canadian province of Manitoba and the U.S. state of Minnesota
- Roseau River, Manitoba, an unincorporated community in the Municipality of Emerson – Franklin, Manitoba, Canada
- Roseau River (Saint Lucia), in Saint Lucia

== See also ==
- Roseau (disambiguation)
- Roseau River Anishinabe First Nation
