= Roseau (disambiguation) =

Roseau is the capital of Dominica.

Roseau, Roseaux or Rosseau may also refer to:

== Roseau ==
- A type of common reed, or phragmite
- Roseau River (Dominica), the river that runs through the city
- Roseau, Saint Lucia, a town on the island
- Roseau Valley, in St. Lucia
- Roseau River (Saint Lucia), a river in Saint Lucia
- Roseau, Minnesota, a city in Roseau County, Minnesota, USA
- Roseau Lake, a lake in Roseau County, Minnesota, USA
- Roseau County, Minnesota
- Roseau River Anishinabe First Nation, in Manitoba, Canada
- Roseau River (Manitoba), a tributary of the Red River of the North in Manitoba and Minnesota

== Roseaux ==
(plural of Roseau in French)

- Roseaux, municipality in the Corail Arrondissement, in the Grand'Anse Department of Haiti
- Roseaux (band), French music project
  - Roseaux (album), debut album of above band

== Rosseau ==
- Rosseau, Cavaellon, Haiti, a village in Haiti
- Rosseau, Ohio, an unincorporated community
- Rosseau, Ontario, a community in Ontario, Canada
- Lake Rosseau, a lake in Ontario, Canada
- Gail Rosseau, an American surgeon
- Jacques Rosseau, a French canoeist
