= Rousseau (disambiguation) =

Jean-Jacques Rousseau (1712–1778) was a Genevan author and philosopher.

Rousseau may also refer to:

== People and fictional characters ==
- Rousseau (surname), a list of people and fictional characters with the surname
- Rousseau O. Crump (1843–1901), American politician and businessman
- Rousseau H. Flower (1913–1988), American paleontologist

== Places ==
=== United States ===
- Rousseau, Kentucky, an unincorporated community
- Lake Rousseau, Florida
- Rousseau Range, Alaska

=== Other ===
- Rousseau (electoral district), a provincial electoral district in Quebec, Canada
- Rousseau Peak, Antarctica

== Other uses ==
- Rousseau Institute, a private school in the Swiss city of Geneva
- Rousseau Metal Inc., a Canadian company founded by André Rousseau
- Rousseau SA, a French manufacturer of agricultural machinery which, in 1962, invented the rotary mower
- An alternative name for French wine made from the grape Chardonnay

== See also ==
- Roseau (disambiguation)
