= Crime in Saint Lucia =

Crime in Saint Lucia, a developing island country, is a significant concern, particularly violent crime like robbery and homicide. Saint Lucia has a crime rate commensurate with that of similar nations in the Caribbean but has a high tourism rate, impacting tourists and locals, who are potential targets of violent crime. This is fueled partly by drug trafficking and gang activity, leading to government efforts to increase police presence and address root causes, though challenges with police response and legal processes persist.

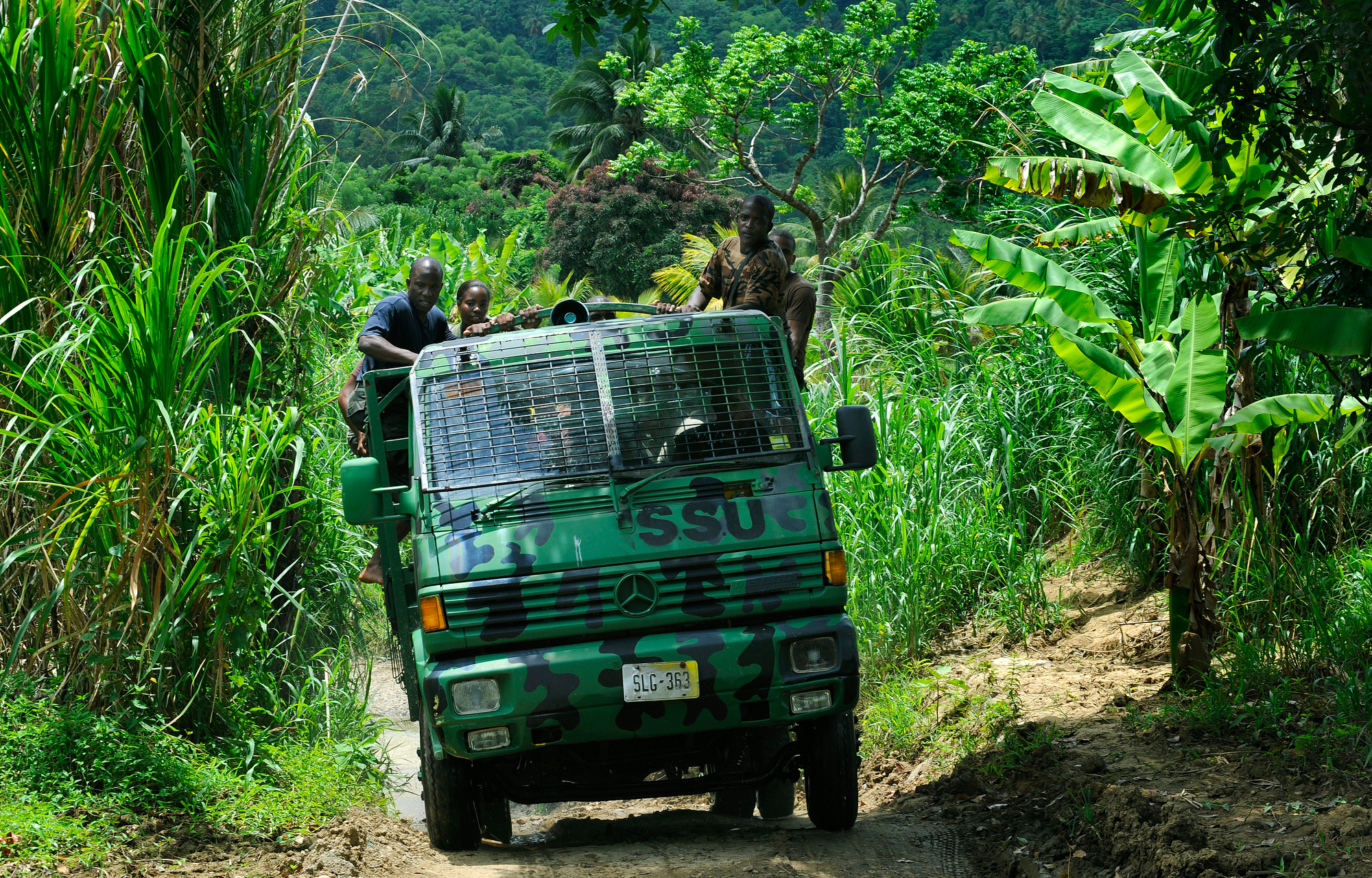
The Royal St. Lucia Police Force's Special Service Unit on an exercise

== Crime by type ==
=== Murder ===
In 2012, Saint Lucia had a murder rate of 21.6 per 100,000 population. There were a total of 39 murders in Saint Lucia in 2012. In 2017, there were 60 homicides recorded in Saint Lucia.

In January 2014, British citizen Roger Pratt was murdered on his yacht, Magnetic Attraction, while moored off Vieux Fort, St Lucia. His widow, Margaret Pratt, has voiced her concerns repeatedly about delays in bringing four men charged with the murder to trial, and systematic failures that led to forensic evidence from the murder scene being contaminated.

Between 2021 and 2023, Saint Lucia recorded its highest murder totals in history, peaking at 76 homicides in 2022 and 75 in 2023.

In early 2026, the government reported that while homicides remain a high priority, the rate began to stabilize following increased tactical operations by the Royal Saint Lucia Police Force (RSLPF).

On May 20, 2026, Joy St. Omer, a 24-year-old woman from Au Tabor, was murdered in her vehicle by her former husband. St. Omer had previously reported the man on numerous occasions in the months preceding her killing, with her demands meeting no response from the authorities. Her murder sparked social outrage and demands to resume executions in the country.

=== Robbery ===
Robbery is an issue in Saint Lucia. In 2014, Saint Lucia was ranked as one of the top 10 most dangerous cruise destinations in the world, there were 69 robberies of cruise passengers on two excursions alone.

On June 29, 2010 a couple were victims of a home intrusion in Marigot Bay. They were hogtied in their villa at gunpoint and held hostage by 3 men. The other two were armed with a machete and a butcher knife. They were robbed of their valuables including their cellphones. The cellphones were used to track the suspects down and they were arrested and convicted of assault and robbery and sentenced to 15 years in prison.

On December 14, 2015 a U.S. couple were robbed by two men carrying a kitchen knife and a machete. Despite filing a report, they have not heard from the police again and it is presumed that the perpetrators are still at large.

In January 2014, a British couple were robbed on board their yacht while it was moored off Vieux Fort, St Lucia, with the husband being murdered. In 2013, 55 cruise ship passengers were robbed at gunpoint during daylight at the Botanical Gardens in Soufriere. No one was injured during the incident.

Current reports from 2025 indicate that "opportunistic" robberies occur most frequently in high-traffic areas like Rodney Bay and Castries, as well as on isolated beaches.

As of 2026, countries like the United States and Canada maintain Level 2 travel advisories, specifically warning visitors about the risk of armed robbery in Saint Lucia.

== Policing ==
The Saint Lucia police have been accused, largely by prominent figures in the then opposition party (St. Lucia Labour Party), of keeping death lists and carrying out extrajudicial killings of suspected criminals in an attempt to make St Lucia more attractive to tourists. Alleged shootings by police took place in 2010 and 2011 during a security drive called Operation Restore Confidence, which was aimed at reducing violent crime and boosting tourism. According to an independent report, officers from the Royal St. Lucia Police Force staged a dozen killings of suspected criminals. The police then reported the killings as murders committed by unknown assailants, planting weapons at the scene. In August 2013 the U.S. government suspended assistance to the Saint Lucia police in light of rumors of the extrajudicial killings.

In 2015 the Saint Lucia police said that they were under-resourced, with not enough police officers to keep up with the crime case load.
