= Rivière du Petit Sault =

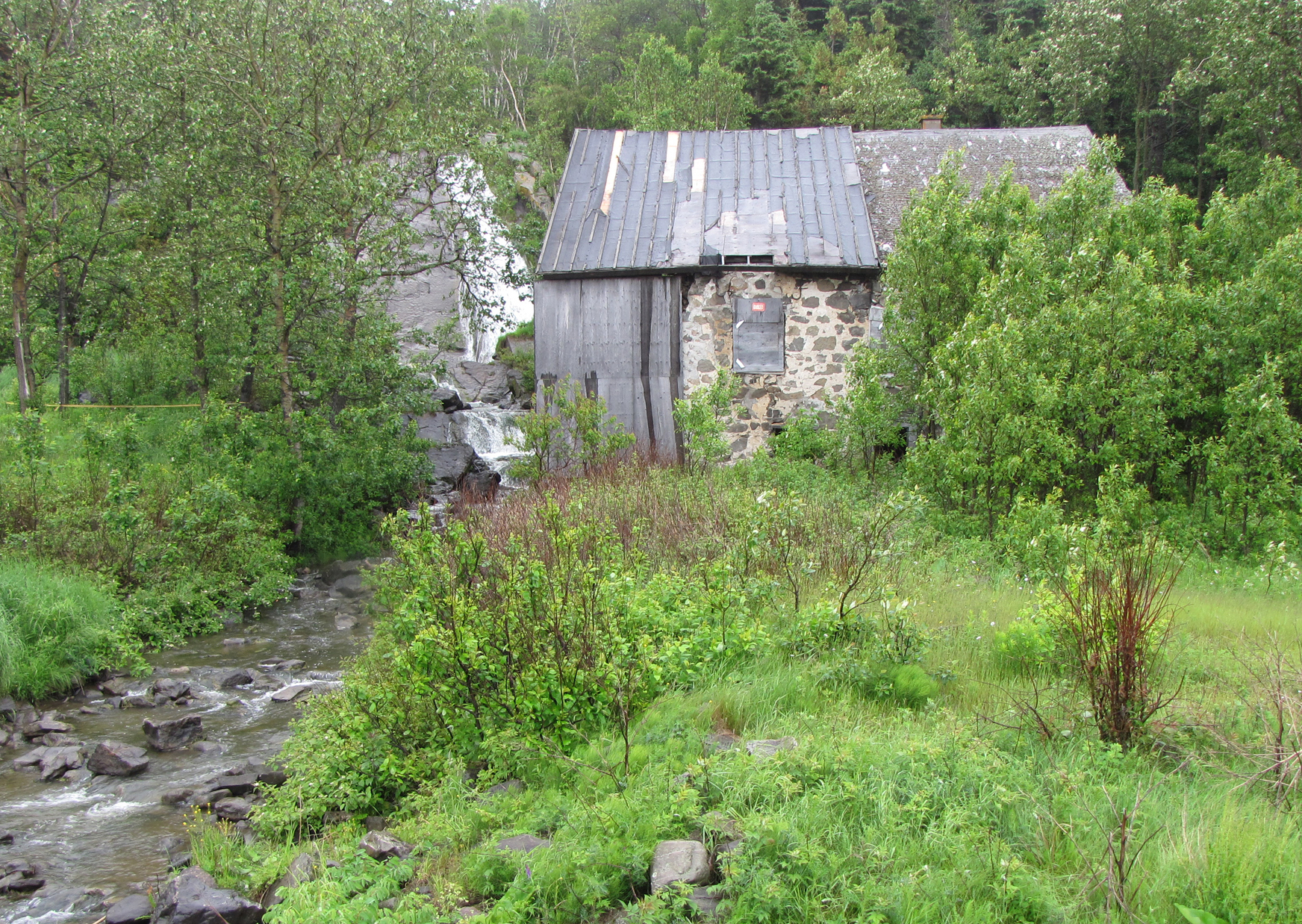

Location
- Country: Canada
- Province: Quebec
- Region: Bas-Saint-Laurent
- MRC: Rivière-du-Loup

Physical characteristics
- Source: Agricultural streams
  - location: Saint-Éloi
  - coordinates: 48°03′11″N 69°11′28″W
  - elevation: 147 m (482 ft)
- Mouth: Gulf of Saint Lawrence
  - location: L'Isle-Verte
  - coordinates: 48°03′29″N 69°17′26″W
  - elevation: 0 m (0 ft)
- Length: 12.2 km (7.6 mi)

The rivière du Petit Sault (English: Small Sault river) flows through the municipalities of Saint-Éloi (MRC Les Basques Regional County Municipality) and L'Isle-Verte (MRC of Rivière-du-Loup Regional County Municipality), in the administrative region of Bas-Saint-Laurent, in Quebec, in Canada.

The Petit Sault River is a tributary of the southeastern coast of the St. Lawrence River at the L'Isle-Verte.

== Geography ==
The Petit Sault river takes its source from agricultural streams located in the municipality of Saint-Éloi. This source is located at 6.1 km (3.8 mi) to the southeast of the southeast coast of the estuary of Saint Lawrence, at 1.0 km (0.62 mi) to the southwest from a bend in the Trois Pistoles River and at 3.5 km (2.2 mi) northeast of the center of the village of Saint-Éloi .

From its source, the Petits Saults river flows in an agricultural zone over 12.2 km (7.6 mi) according to the following segments:

- 3.2 km (2.0 mi) west in Saint-Éloi, to chemin du 3e rang East;
- 4.1 km (2.5 mi) north-west, up to the 2e rang East road;
- 0.5 km (0.31 mi) north-west, to the limit of the municipality of L'Isle-Verte (Saint-Jean-Baptiste-de-l'Isle-Verte sector);
- 1.3 km (0.81 mi) heading west, crossing highway 20, to route de la Station;
- 2.3 km (1.4 mi) westward, collecting water from a stream (coming from the south), to Pettigrew Road;
- 0.8 km (0.50 mi) northwesterly, crossing the Canadian National railway line and route 132, to its confluence.

The Petit Sault river flows into Anse Verte, on the Loups Marins flats, of the St. Lawrence River, in the village of the municipality of L'Isle-Verte, facing the Île aux Pommes, located 5.1 km (3.2 mi) from the shore. This confluence is located 6.1 km (3.8 mi) northeast of the center of the village of L'Isle-Verte.

== Toponymy ==
The toponym "rivière du Petit Sault" was made official on December 4, 1980, at the Commission de toponymie du Québec.
