= Adélard Godbout =

Premier of Quebec in 1936 and from 1939 to 1944

The Honourable Adélard Godbout
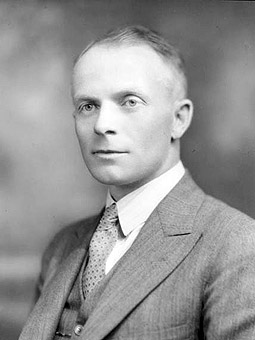
- Godbout, c. 1932

15th Premier of Quebec
- In office November 8, 1939 – August 30, 1944
- Monarch: George VI
- Lieutenant Governor: Ésioff-Léon Patenaude; Eugène Fiset
- Preceded by: Maurice Duplessis
- Succeeded by: Maurice Duplessis
- In office June 11, 1936 – August 28, 1936
- Monarch: Edward VIII
- Lieutenant Governor: Ésioff-Léon Patenaude
- Preceded by: Louis-A. Taschereau
- Succeeded by: Maurice Duplessis

Senator for Montarville, Quebec
- In office June 25, 1949 – September 18, 1956
- Appointed by: Louis St. Laurent
- Preceded by: Charles-Philippe Beaubien
- Succeeded by: Henri Charles Bois

Member of the Legislative Assembly of Quebec for L'Islet
- In office October 25, 1939 – July 28, 1948
- Preceded by: Joseph Bilodeau
- Succeeded by: Fernand Lizotte
- In office May 13, 1929 – August 17, 1936
- Preceded by: Élisée Theriault
- Succeeded by: Joseph Bilodeau

Personal details
- Born: Joseph-Adélard Godbout; September 24, 1892 Saint-Éloi, Quebec, Canada
- Died: September 18, 1956 (aged 63) Montreal, Quebec, Canada
- Party: Liberal
- Profession: Agronomist

Joseph-Adélard Godbout (September 24, 1892 – September 18, 1956) was a Canadian agronomist and politician. He served briefly as the 15th premier of Quebec in 1936 and again from 1939 to 1944. He was also leader of the Parti Libéral du Québec (PLQ) from 1936 to 1949.

== Early life and career ==
Adélard Godbout was born in Saint-Éloi. He was the son of Eugène Godbout and Marie-Louise Duret. His father was a farmer and Liberal Member of the Legislative Assembly (MLA) from 1921 to 1923. He studied at the Séminaire de Rimouski, the agricultural school of Sainte-Anne-de-la-Pocatière, and the Massachusetts Agricultural College in the U.S. state of Massachusetts. He then became a teacher at the Sainte-Anne-de-la-Pocatière agricultural school from 1918 to 1930. He was an agronomist for the Ministry of Agriculture from 1922 to 1925.

== Political career ==
=== Member of the legislature ===
Godbout became a Member of the Legislative Assembly for the district of L'Islet in the Chaudière-Appalaches region after winning a by-election unopposed on May 13, 1929. He was re-elected in the 1931 and 1935 elections.

=== Cabinet minister ===
Godbout was appointed to the Cabinet by Premier Louis-Alexandre Taschereau and served as minister of agriculture from November 27, 1930, to June 27, 1936.

=== First premiership ===
Shortly after the 1935 election, Conservative leader Maurice Duplessis, a rising figure in Quebec politics, forced Taschereau to call the Standing Committee on Public Accounts, which brought to light widespread corruption in the provincial government. The committee's revelations embarrassed several Liberal insiders. On June 11, 1936, less than a year after being returned to office, Taschereau resigned. He recommended Édouard Lacroix and Adélard Godbout to Lieutenant Governor Ésioff-Léon Patenaude as possible successors. Lacroix declined when offered the opportunity to form a government. The offer was then extended to Godbout, who accepted and succeeded Taschereau as Liberal leader and premier of Quebec, with the support of federal cabinet members. An election was then called for August 1936.

Godbout had remained untouched by the scandals. However, despite his talk of "a new order" in an effort to distance himself from the Taschereau era, his first government lasted only two months, as the Liberal Party suffered a humiliating defeat in the 1936 election. Led by Duplessis, the recently created Union nationale took office. The Liberals were reduced to 14 seats, and Godbout lost re-election in his own district of L'Islet. He remained Liberal Leader after being reconfirmed at the 1938 party leadership convention, but T.-D. Bouchard led the parliamentary wing of the party until the 1939 election.

=== Second premiership ===
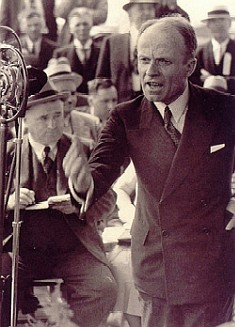
Godbout launching the 1939 campaign in Saint-Hyacinthe

World War II created the opportunity Godbout needed to make a political comeback. An early provincial general election was called in 1939, and federal cabinet member Ernest Lapointe, the Quebec lieutenant of Prime Minister Mackenzie King, campaigned for Godbout, guaranteeing that no one would face conscription if voters supported the Liberals. Through the campaign, Godbout relentlessly repeated the formal promise: "The government will never declare military conscription. I undertake, on my honour, weighing each of my words, to leave my party and even to fight against it, if even one French Canadian, before the end of the hostilities in Europe, is mobilized against his will under a Liberal government." The Liberals went on to win the election with 70 of 86 seats. Godbout formed his second government, serving as premier and as minister of agriculture.

While premier of Quebec, Godbout published an article entitled "Canada: Unity in Diversity" in 1943. In it, he asked, "How does the dual relationship of the French Canadians make them an element of strength and order, and therefore of unity, in our joint civilization, which necessarily includes not only Canada and the British Commonwealth of Nations, but also the United States, the Latin republics of America and liberated France?"

==== Accomplishments ====
Under Godbout's premiership, the provincial government implemented a number of significant progressive measures, laying the groundwork for the Quiet Revolution carried out by the government of Premier Jean Lesage two decades later. The Liberal administration also adopted many of the proposals made by Paul Gouin's Action libérale nationale in the 1935 election. These measures included:

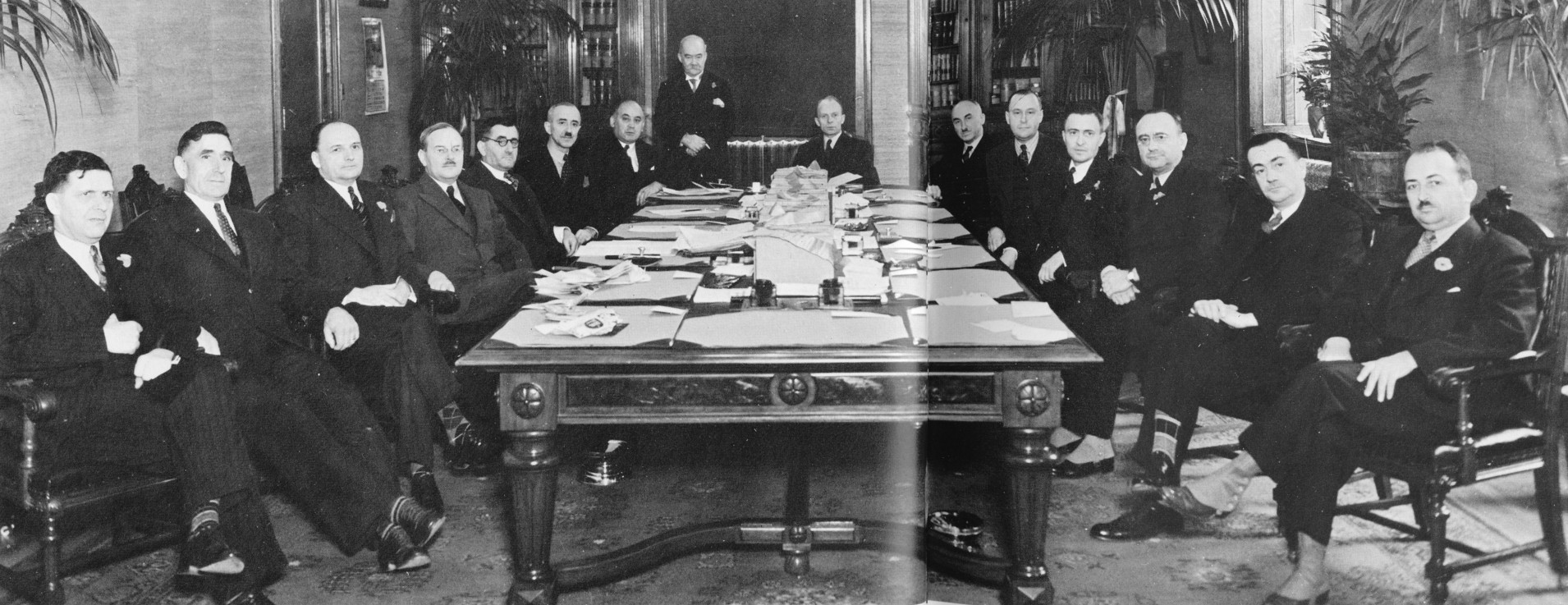
The Godbout cabinet, November 10, 1939

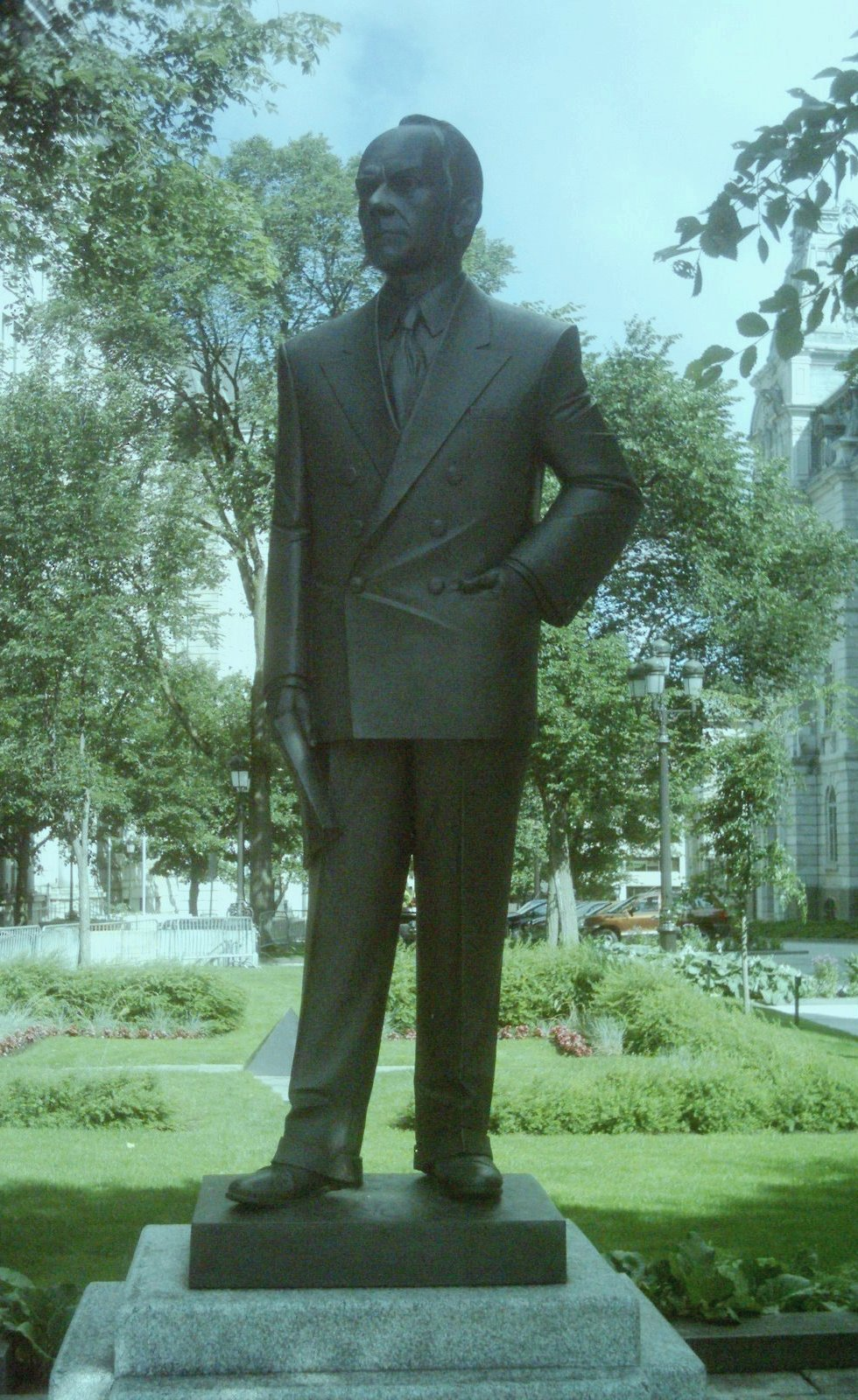
Michel Binette's Adelard Godbout sculpture in front of Parliament Building (Quebec)

- the enactment of women's suffrage in 1940, despite resistance from Duplessis and the Catholic Church;
- the establishment of a Civil Service Commission in 1943;
- the passage of legislation making school attendance compulsory until age 14 and introducing free primary education in 1943;
- the adoption of a labour code in 1944, establishing principles for union certification and the negotiation of collective agreements;
- the nationalization of the Montreal Light, Heat & Power Company, a private corporation that held a monopoly on gas and electricity in the Montreal area, leading to the creation of Hydro-Québec in 1944;
- the encouragement of French culture and language.

==== Relations with the federal government ====
Because he served during wartime and dealt with federal politicians who favoured a strong central government, Godbout abandoned several traditional provincial jurisdictions. The most notable powers surrendered to the Government of Canada included:

- the ability to create and oversee a provincial unemployment insurance system; a national program was introduced in 1940;
- the power to tax personal and corporate income, in exchange for more modest financial compensation from the federal government.

In a 1942 plebiscite, Canadian voters were asked to release the federal government from its earlier commitment not to introduce military conscription. Quebec was the only province with a majority voting against release from that commitment. The decision by Mackenzie King to allow conscription, after both he and Godbout had previously ruled it out, was unpopular in Quebec. Duplessis criticised both conscription and federal encroachments on provincial autonomy, capitalizing on the Quebec population's general mistrust of the federal government.

=== Leader of the Opposition ===
In the 1944 provincial election, Godbout's Liberals and Duplessis's Union Nationale received similar shares of the popular vote. Although the Liberals received slightly more votes, the Union Nationale won a majority of seats in the legislature, largely because of its strong support in rural areas. During the campaign, Duplessis made an antisemitic speech that Godbout and the federal government had agreed to take in 100,000 Jewish refugees after the war and settle them in Quebec. He alleged this was in exchange for the "International Zionist Brotherhood" funding Godbout's re-election campaign. Duplessis claimed that he would never take money from the Jews and that, if elected premier again, he would stop this alleged plan. Although the claim was false, it was widely believed and contributed to a surge of antisemitism that helped Union Nationale win.

Godbout served as leader of the Opposition until the 1948 election. Benefiting from post-war prosperity, the Union Nationale won an overwhelming majority. The Liberals won only eight seats, six of them on the Montreal Island. Once again, Godbout narrowly lost re-election in his home district of L'Islet. In 1950, he relinquished leadership of the Liberal Party to Georges-Émile Lapalme.

=== Senator ===
In 1949, Godbout was appointed to the Senate of Canada on the recommendation of Prime Minister Louis St. Laurent. He remained a senator until his death in 1956. His wife died in 1969, aged 79.

=== Legacy ===
Observers are divided on the significance of Godbout's legacy. Lacking the oratory skills of Duplessis, his main political competitor, Godbout is sometimes judged severely. Federalists stress the importance of the progressive precedents set under Godbout's premiership. Autonomists on the other hand criticize him for taking a weak stance on provincial autonomy. More nuanced analyses argue that, being in power during World War II, he governed in a difficult time, despite the shortcomings in his relations with the federal government.

In his 2000 film entitled Traître ou Patriote, filmmaker Jacques Godbout, Adélard's nephew, lamented what he perceived as a lack of public knowledge about his uncle's work and premiership.

On September 27, 2007, a former electrical power station in Montréal, at the corner of Wellington and Queen streets, known as Poste Central-1, was named in Godbout's honour in a ceremony attended by Premier Jean Charest. A bust of Godbout by sculptor Joseph-Émile Brunet was installed at the site.

For his contribution to agriculture and the advancement of rural Quebec, Godbout was posthumously inducted into the Canadian Agricultural Hall of Fame in 1962 and into the Agricultural Hall of Fame of Quebec in 1992.

== Bibliography ==
- Genest, Jean-Guy, Godbout, Septentrion, Sillery, 1996, 390 pp.
- "Godbout, Adélard". Dictionary of Canadian Biography. Vol. 18. University of Toronto/Université Laval.
- "Biography". Dictionnaire des parlementaires du Québec de 1792 à nos jours (in French). National Assembly of Quebec.
- Adélard Godbout – Parliament of Canada biography

== See also ==
- Politics of Quebec
- Quebec general elections
- Timeline of Quebec history

Government offices
Preceded by Joseph-Léonide Perron (Liberal)	Minister of Agriculture; 1930–1936	Succeeded by Bona Dussault (Union Nationale)
Political offices
Preceded by Maurice Duplessis (Union Nationale)	Leader of the Opposition in Quebec; 1944–1948	Succeeded by George Carlyle Marler (Liberal)
