= Anse La Raye =

Town in Saint Lucia

Anse la Raye
- Town
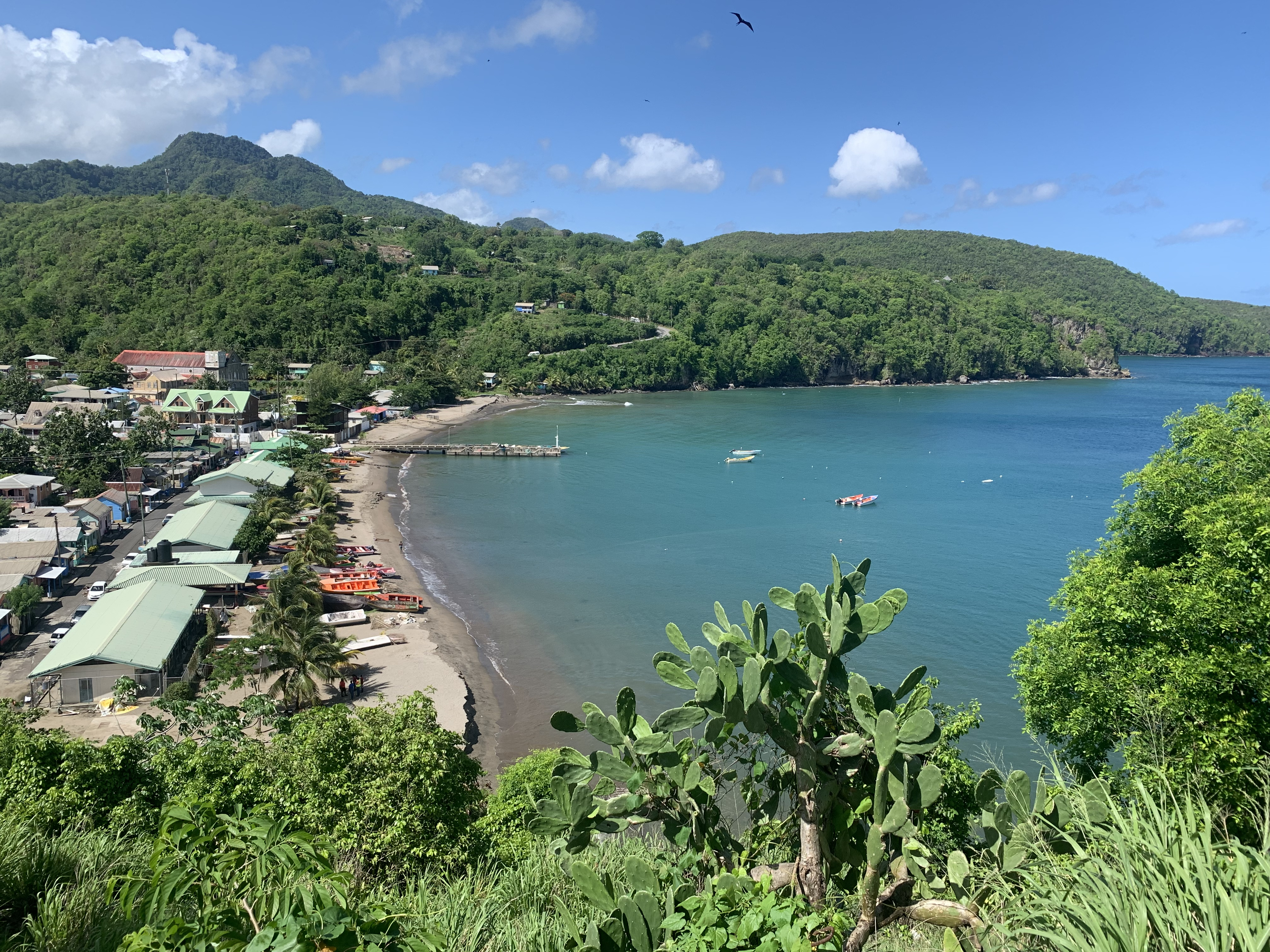
- Overlooking Anse La Raye from the North

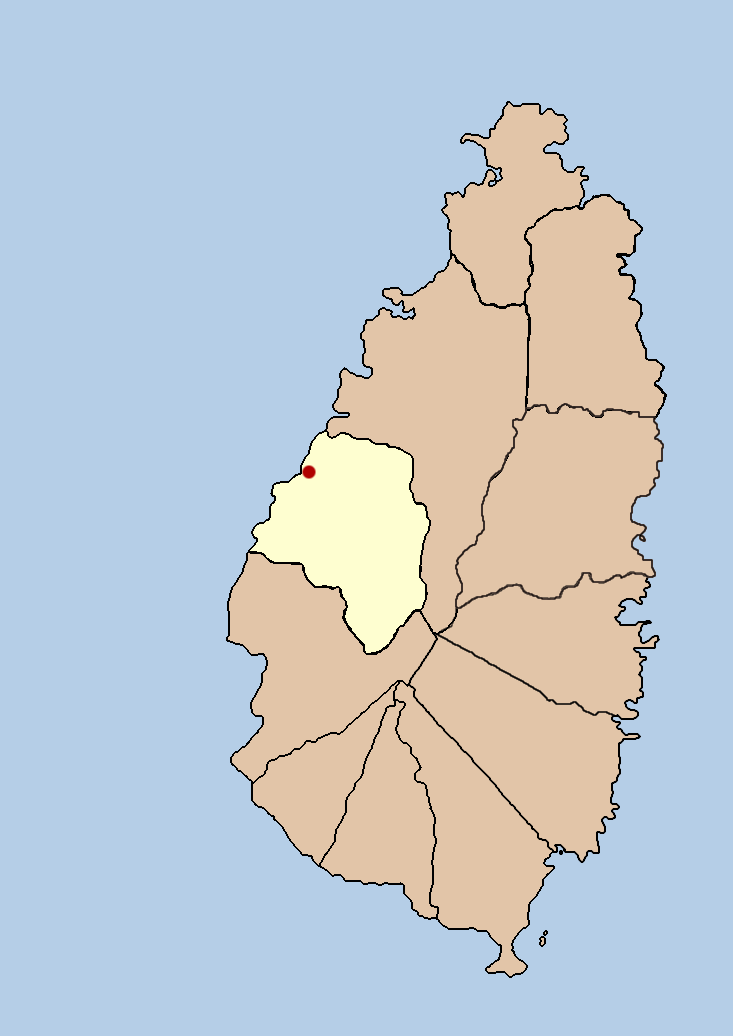
- Boundary of Anse la Raye District in Saint Lucia with location of city
- Coordinates: 13°56′45″N 61°02′13″W
- Country: Saint Lucia
- District: Anse la Raye District
- City: Anse la Raye
- Founded: 18th Century
- Founder: France
- Named for: The rays found in the bay

Government
  - Governing body: Anse la Raye Village Council
- Elevation: 99 m (325 ft)

Population (2010)
  - Total: 6,354 (District) 1,256 (city)
- Time zone: UTC-4 (Eastern Caribbean Time Zone (ECT))
- Area code: 758
- Website: www.anselaraye.com

Anse La Raye or Anse-La-Raye is the largest town and seat of the Anse la Raye District of Saint Lucia. It is located on the island's western side, near Marigot Bay, and has several examples of French and English colonial architecture.

== History ==
The name Anse la Raye is derived from the rays that are found in the bay, the English translation means Bay of Rays. Two rivers flow into the bay, these are the Grande Rivière de l'Anse la Raye and the Petite Rivière de l'Anse la Raye. On a Friday night there is a fish fry where lobsters, fish and lambi (conch) are cooked and eaten. The fish fry is located on Front Street, which runs parallel to the beach.

The local Catholic church was built in 1907, but records show that a chapel has existed since 1765. The present church has murals painted by the St Omer Family. Nearby attractions include the Anse la Raye Falls and the River Rock Falls.

The town is noted for its youth music groups, the "Cecilian Reys" and the "Anse La Raye Youth Orchestra", both of which were formed under the direction of Petronilla Deterville. Performing since 1981 throughout the country, the group aims to expand the cultural experiences of youth from the area.

== See also ==
- Geography of Saint Lucia
- List of cities in Saint Lucia
- List of rivers of Saint Lucia
- Districts of Saint Lucia

== Scenes ==
Scenes of Anse la Raye
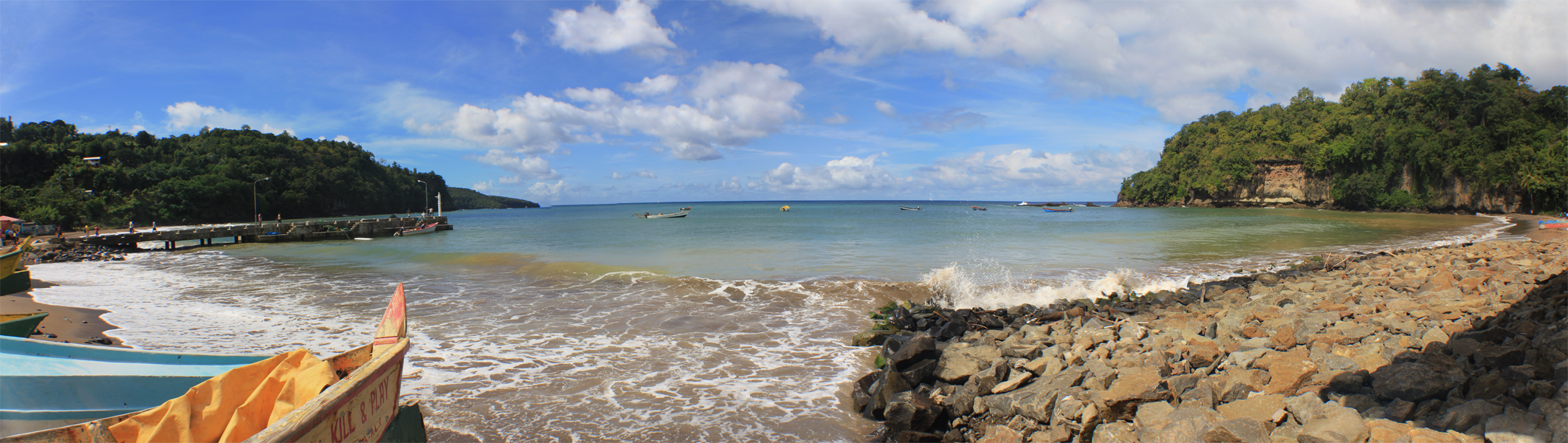
View of Anse la Raye

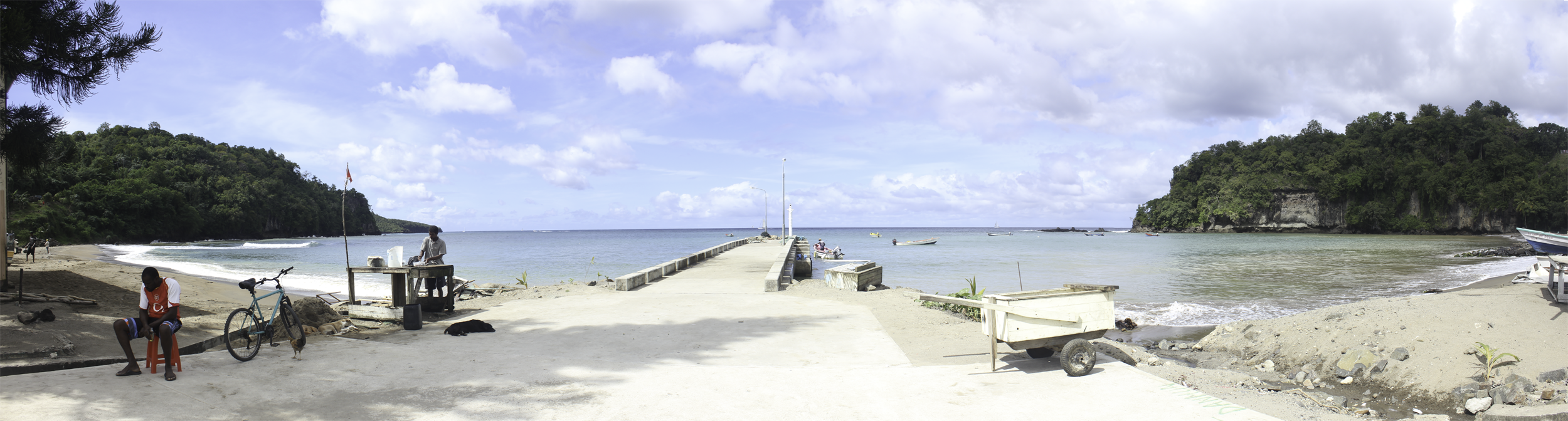
View from the Dock

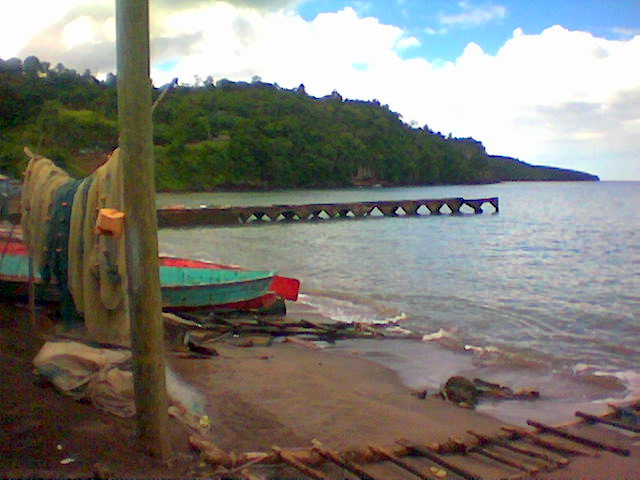
Fishing boats at Anse la Raye

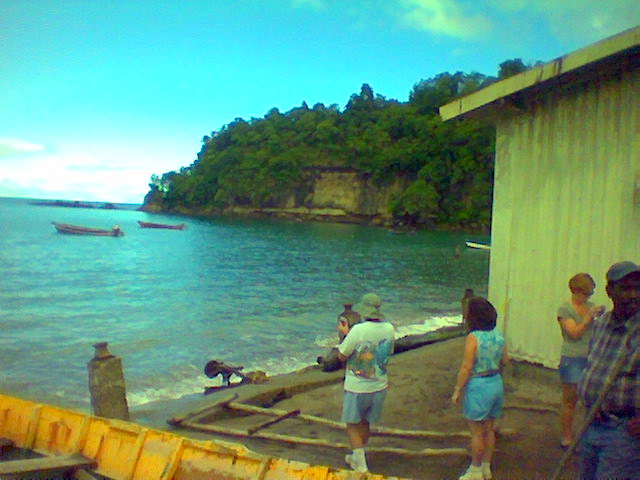
Seafront at Anse la Raye

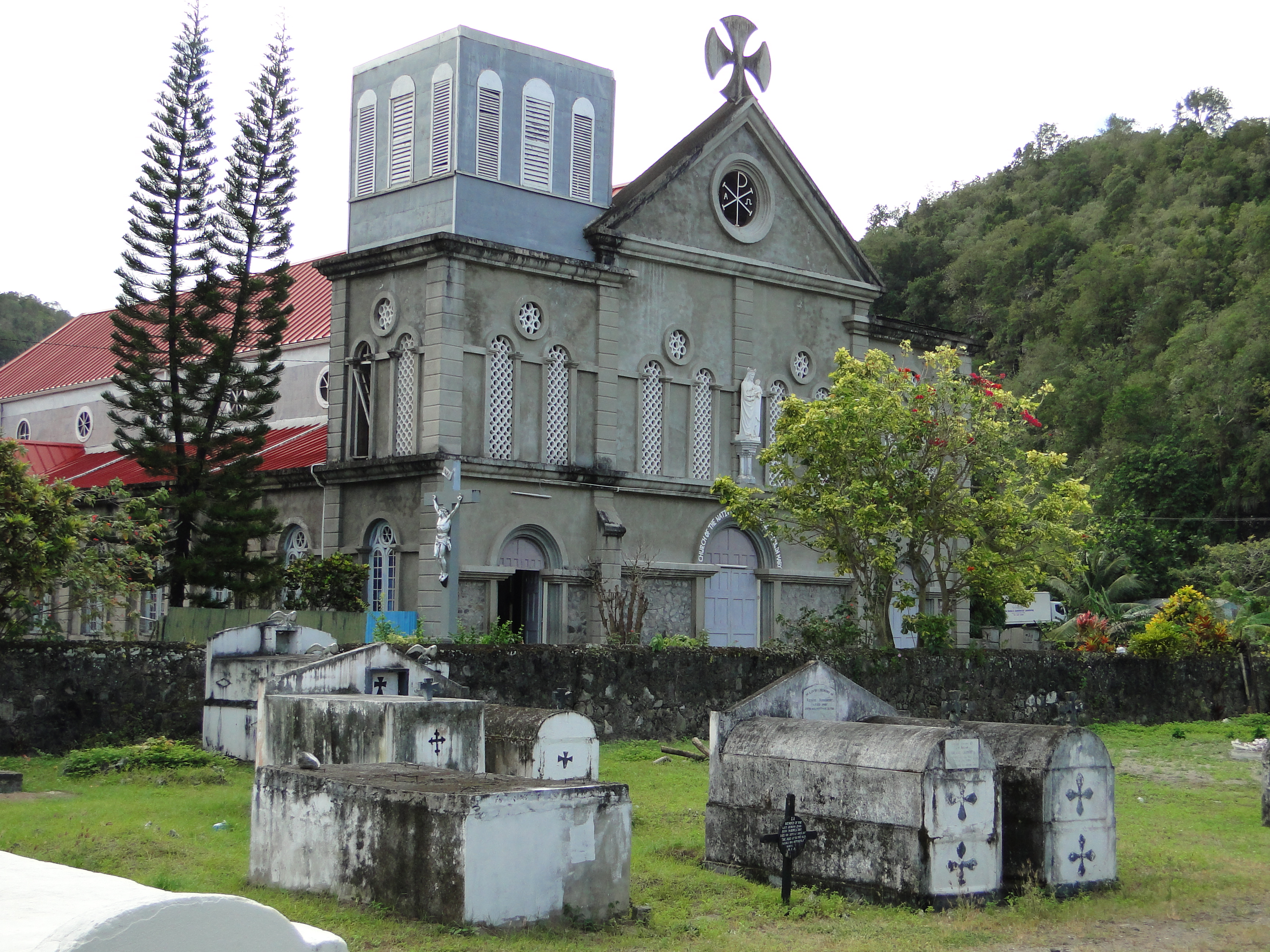
Anse La Reye Catholic church
