= André Rousseau =

Canadian politician

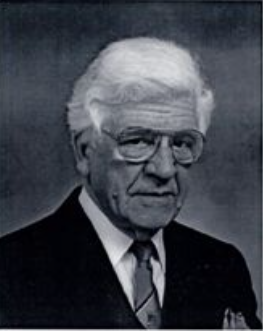

MLA for L'Islet
- In office 1960–1962
- Preceded by: Fernand Lizotte
- Succeeded by: Fernand Lizotte

Personal details
- Born: January 12, 1911 Saint-Lambert, Quebec
- Died: September 17, 2002 (aged 91) Saint-Jean-Port-Joli, Quebec
- Cabinet: Minister of Industry and Commerce

André Rousseau (January 12, 1911 – September 17, 2002) was an entrepreneur and politician in Quebec. He was the first to occupy the position of Minister of Industry and Commerce from July 5, 1960, to December 5, 1962, under the first Government of Jean Lesage. In 1950, Rousseau also founded Rousseau Metal inc., a Quebec company that is specialized in the manufacturing of storage systems.

== Biography ==
The son of Lacasse Rousseau and Gabrielle Fafard, André Rousseau was born on January 12, 1911, in Saint-Lambert Quebec, on the South Shore (Montreal). He was the seventh child in a family of 14 (12 boys and 2 girls). He studied at the Soeurs de la Providence and at the Notre-Dame-du-Saint-Rosaire school in Montreal, the Sacre-Cœur college in Montmagny and the Seminaire de Québec. His first wife was Cécile Collin, deceased in 1957, with whom he had 6 daughters and one adopted son. In 1959, he married Simone Ouellet who already had 4 children.

At the young age of 16, André Rousseau began work in one of his father's companies. His father, Lacasse, has been recognized as a pioneer in the development of electricity in the Montmagny—L'Islet region. From 1935 to 1940, André Rousseau worked at Dufresne Engineering and was in charge of overseeing the electrification project during the construction of the Wellington tunnel that passed under the Lachine Canal and the Pierre Le Gardeur Bridge in Montreal. From 1940 to 1950, he was Vice President of Electrical Manufacturing Limited in Montmagny, a company also founded by his father, (which later became Montel).

In 1950, after relocating to Saint-Jean-Port-Joli, André Rousseau founded Rousseau Metal inc., and later Moto-Kometik in the 1970s. He was President of Rousseau Metal inc., until his retirement in 1985 and was succeeded by his son-in-law, Simon-Pierre Paré. From 1950 to 1960 Rousseau was a Director of Paul Dumont Ltd. in Saint-Romuald, Quebec, and of Artistic Decalcomania in Montreal. Rousseau was a defender of private enterprise and assisted in the financial rescue of many enterprises in Quebec headed for bankruptcy, including Moto-Kometik which was consolidated with Rousseau Metal Inc.

== Political and public activities ==
Rousseau was a friend of Georges-Émile Lapalme and held the position as Secretary of the Quebec Liberal Party in 1956 and as president in 1957 and 1958. He was consulted by Lapalme in the weeks preceding the Liberal convention of May 1958. In June 1960 at the National Assembly of Quebec, he was elected to serve as a Member of Parliament for the Quebec Liberal Party in the county of Montmagny-L'Islet. In July, he was named Minister of Industry and Commerce under the government of Jean Lesage. During his mandate as Minister, he accomplished many projects. Among these were the creation of an Economic Research Office and a Statistics Office; the funding for creating the Centre de l'organisation scientifique de l'entreprise (Cose); the creation of the Loi des fonds industriels municipaux; the division of Quebec into regions (see List of regions of Quebec) and the installation of delegates of the Ministry of Industry and Commerce into each of these regions; and finally, the creation of Economic Boards, now known as the Conseil regional de développement (CRD's). On an international level, he succeeded in giving weight to economic teams of the first delegations outside of Quebec in New York, London and Paris.

Although Rousseau was personally opposed to the nationalization of private electricity companies, he remained faithful to the government and sought a second mandate at the 1962 Quebec general election. Although defeated on election night, by Fernand Lizotte of the Union Nationale (Quebec), Rousseau remained very active in the political arena. From 1963 to 1968, he was the Representative of the Quebec Government on the Board of Directors and as an executive for Expo 67 in Montreal. In 1970, he became the first president of the Bouchard Foundation and from 1972 to 1980, the President of the Societe du Parc Industriel du centre-du-Quebec de Becancour, Quebec. He reentered politics during the 1976 Quebec general election as a candidate for the Union Nationale in Montmagny-L'Islet but was defeated by the liberal Julien Giasson.

He was also president of the Commission industrielle et touristique de Saint-Jean-Port-Joli, and from 1990 to 1993, president of the fund-raising campaign for the l'Institut Québécois de recherche sur la culture, enabling the publication of the impressive "Histoire de la Cote-du-Sud", an essential work for anyone interested in the history of Montmagny and surrounding areas. It should also be noted that he was a member of many other different organizations such as: The Association professionnelle des industriels, the Centre des dirigeants d'entreprise, the Association des manufacturiers Canadiens, the Club de la garnison, Knights of Columbus, the Richelieu Club, the Chamber of Commerce and Industry of Saint-Jean-Port-Joli and the Association des Amis de Saint-Benoit-du-Lac.
