= John Compton Dam =

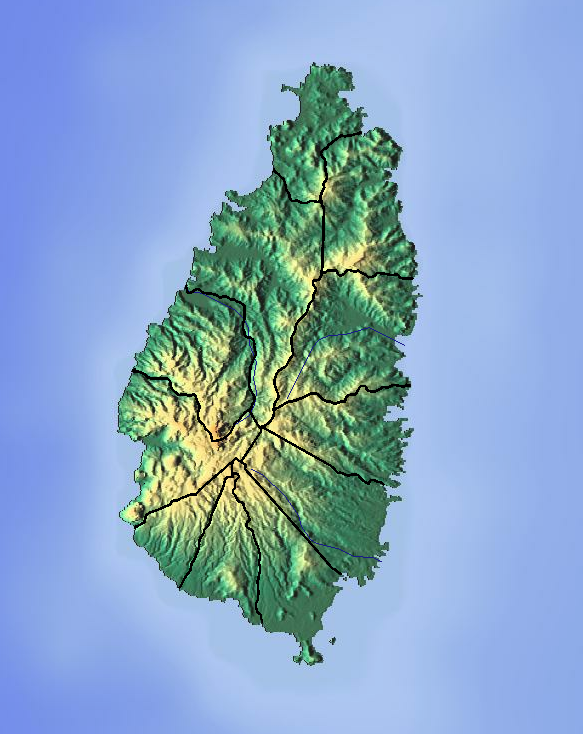
- Location within Saint Lucia
- Country: Saint Lucia
- Location: Millet, Anse la Raye Quarter
- Coordinates: 13°54′1.25″N 060°59′16.66″W
- Purpose: Municipal water
- Status: Operational
- Construction began: 1993
- Opening date: 1995; 31 years ago

Dam and spillways
- Type of dam: Embankment, concrete-face rock-fill
- Impounds: Roseau River
- Height: 45 m (148 ft)
- Length: 200 m (660 ft)

Reservoir
- Creates: Roseau Reservoir
- Total capacity: 2,600,000 m^{3} (2,100 acre⋅ft)

The John Compton Dam, formerly known as the Roseau Dam, is a concrete-face rock-fill dam on the Roseau River in the small community of Millet in central Saint Lucia. The primary purpose of the dam is municipal water supply. It is named after John Compton, the former Prime Minister of Saint Lucia, who was influential in its implementation.

Construction on it began in April 1993 but was substantially delayed when Tropical Storm Debby struck the island on 10 September 1994. Rainfall from the storm exceeded the 1000 year estimate and ensuing floods breached the incomplete dam. The dam was eventually completed in October 1995. The dam's reservoir, Roseau Reservoir, is experiencing heavily siltation and studies are currently underway to remediate the problem. Hurricane Tomas in 2010 and a severe December 2013 storm created large landslides in the reservoir that have reduced its capacity by 30 percent.
