= L'Islet (provincial electoral district) =

Coordinates: 47°5′0″N 70°19′30″W

Quebec electoral district

Defunct provincial electoral district
- Legislature: National Assembly of Quebec
- District created: 1867
- District abolished: 1972
- First contested: 1867
- Last contested: 1970

L'Islet (French pronunciation: [lilɛ]) was a provincial electoral district in the province of Quebec, Canada.

It was created for the 1867 election (and an electoral district of that name existed earlier in the Legislative Assembly of the Province of Canada and the Legislative Assembly of Lower Canada). Its final election was in 1970. It disappeared in the 1973 election and its successor electoral district was Montmagny-L'Islet.

== Members of the Legislative Assembly / National Assembly ==
- Pamphile-Gaspard Verreault, Conservative Party (1867–1878)
- Jean-Baptiste Couillard Dupuis, Liberal (1878–1881)
- Charles Marcotte, Conservative Party (1881–1886)
- François-Gilbert Miville Dechene, Liberal (1886–1902)
- Joseph-Édouard Caron, Liberal (1902–1912)
- Joseph-Octave Morin, Conservative Party (1912–1916)
- Élisée Theriault, Liberal (1916–1929)
- Adélard Godbout, Liberal (1929–1936)
- Joseph Bilodeau, Union Nationale (1936–1939)
- Adélard Godbout, Liberal (1939–1948)
- Fernand Lizotte, Union Nationale (1948–1960)
- André Rousseau, Liberal (1960–1962)
- Fernand Lizotte, Union Nationale (1962–1970)
- Julien Giasson, Liberal (1970–1973)
