= Au Tabor =

- Location in Anse Lay Ray District, Saint Lucia
- Coordinates: 13°56′46″N 61°02′29″W
- Country: Saint Lucia
- District: Anse la Raye

Au Tabor is a coastal town in the Anse la Raye District, Saint Lucia. It is located along the Caribbean Sea on the western coast, just north of the town of Anse La Raye and bordering the settlement of Massacre.

The second-order administrative divisions of Au Tabor and Au Tabor Hill have populations of 451 and 78, respectively.

== Notable people ==
- Joy St. Omer (2001/2002–2026), a woman whose murder in May 2026 sparked national outrage and calls for the resumption of capital punishment in the country

== See also ==
- List of cities in Saint Lucia
