= Jean-Paul Cook =

Canadian politician

Member of Parliament for Montmagny—L'Islet
- In office September 1962 – April 1963
- Preceded by: Louis Fortin
- Succeeded by: Jean-Charles Richard Berger

Personal details
- Born: 19 July 1927 Quebec City, Quebec
- Died: 29 June 2005 (aged 77)
- Party: Social Credit
- Profession: interior decorator, merchant

Jean-Paul Cook (19 July 1927 – 29 June 2005) was a Social Credit party member of the House of Commons of Canada. He was born in Quebec City, Quebec and became an interior decorator and merchant by career.

He was first elected at the Montmagny—L'Islet riding in the 1962 general election and served one term, the 25th Parliament. In the 1963 federal election, he was defeated by Jean-Charles Richard Berger of the Liberal party.
