= Murder of Joy St. Omer =

2026 murder in Saint Lucia

- Undated photo of St. Omer
- Location: Marigot, Castries, Saint Lucia
- Date: May 20, 2026; 5 months ago
- Attack type: Murder by shooting, femicide
- Victims: Joy St. Omer, aged 24
- Motive: Unknown, history of intimate partner violence
- Accused: Primus Toussaint

On May 20, 2026, Joy St. Omer, 24, was shot and killed inside her vehicle in the Marigot district of Castries, capital of Saint Lucia. Her estranged partner Primus Toussaint was arrested and charged with aggravated murder.

The case sparked outrage in Saint Lucia over the numerous occasions in which St. Omer asked for help in dealing with Toussaint's violence. The debate has included calls to resume capital punishment in Saint Lucia, which is a de facto abolitionist country since 1995.

== Case ==
Joy St. Omer was a mother of one and resided in Au Tabor, a coastal town in the Anse la Raye District of Saint Lucia. She had been engaged in a violent relationship with her child's father, Primus Toussaint, who was 34 years old at the time of his arrest and from Belvedere, Canaries District. According to public records, the case between St. Omer and Toussaint came into the Anse La Raye Police Station's attention on February 19, 2026, when St. Omer reported that she had been assaulted by Toussaint. She was subsequently referred to a family court which granted her a three-day interim protection order and served Toussaint with a legal document to appear in court.

Officers of the Anse La Raye Police Station accompanied St. Omer to the house she shared with Toussaint and helped her gather her belongings to move to her mother's home due to safety reasons. On February 24, the court heard both parts and extended the restriction order for six months while the judicial process continued. However, Toussaint went to St. Omer's mother's home in Au Tabor and assaulted her on March 8. The following day, St. Omer gave a formal statement before the police, and an arrest warrant was issued against Toussaint. Assistant Commissioner of Police Luke Defreitas stated after St. Omer's killing that law enforcement agencies launched an operation between Canaries and Marigot on March 11 after they were not able to find Toussaint.

Police finally located and arrested Toussaint. He was charged on March 13 with one count of breaching a protection order, one count of harm, one count of assault and one count of threats. Toussaint appeared before the First District Court on March 16 and was denied bail upon the request from the prosecution. The judge remanded him in custody, and he was taken to Bordelais Correctional Facility in Dennery District. While awaiting further proceedings in the case, Toussaint appealed for bail directly to the High Court, which granted him release on April 21. Aware of her former husband's release from prison, St. Omer wrote a letter to the Anse la Raye Police Station stating that she no longer wished to pursue charges against Toussaint, citing a lack of confidence in the justice system and the upholding of the restriction order against him.

Thirteen days later, on May 20, 2026, St. Omer was found dead inside her vehicle in Marigot. She had been shot multiple times. Toussaint was quickly apprehended, and he was formally charged with murder on May 23. Two days later the Castries Magistrate's Court remanded him in custody with no bail, and he was imprisoned again at the Bordelais Correctional Facility, where he remains incarcerated awaiting trial for St. Omer's murder.

== Reaction ==
Primus Toussaint was booked at the Bordelais Correctional Facility on March 19, 2026, on the charge of assault, threats and breach of a restriction order.

St. Omer's killing sparked outrage and debate in Saint Lucia, especially due to the lack of police and judicial action after the repeated occasions in which she reported Toussaint's violent behaviour. On social media, users asked for the resumption of the death penalty in the country and demanded quick action from the government. Saint Lucia is a de facto abolitionist nation that carried out its last execution on October 17, 1995, when convicted rapist and murderer Joseph Solomon was hanged in Castries.

Prime Minister Philip J. Pierre offered condolences to St. Omer's family and called for peace among the population, saying that any consideration to resume executions in the country requires very careful thinking. He further stated that he understood the emotional and political weight of St. Omer's murder and said that someone asks him everyday to bring back the death penalty, even proposing the replacement of hanging by the method of lethal injection. Pierre also condemned violence against women.

The Royal Saint Lucia Police Force (RSLPF) and the High Court were heavily criticised for the handling of the case, with the RSLPF launching own investigation into the killing. The family of St. Omer called for an independent inquiry into the protection system for women victims of domestic violence or IPV.

Bertilia St. Omer, mother of the victim, wrote a letter in August 2026 addressing Prime Minister Pierre and Governor General Felix Finisterre, asking for her request of an independent inquiry to be granted. She said that law enforcement agencies must have trained and specialised personnel to respond to situations of domestic and gender-based violence. Bertilia additionally asked Pierre and Finisterre to consider whether current Saint Lucian laws are strong enough to face these crimes. St. Omer's family also launched a public petition to gather signatures and support the request.

Social activists and prominent figures of Saint Lucian society expressed shock at St. Omer's killing and asked for a full review of the judicial system, law enforcement and other support agencies to be conducted. Youth activist Alens Plante said that St. Omer's murder caused fear in young women in the country, making them wonder what would happen to them if their partner acted in a similar way. Plante added that the case made young women fear dating and stated that he hoped that authorities would handle reports of gender-based violence more seriously. Sister Rufina Donat, principal of Saint Joseph's Convent and who was a teacher of St. Omer during her school years, said that the safety of women and children should be a national priority and highlighted the importance of teaching young people about engaging in healthy relationships.
