= Louis Fortin =

Canadian politician

Member of Parliament for Montmagny—L'Islet
- In office September 1958 – June 1962
- Preceded by: Jean Lesage
- Succeeded by: Jean-Paul Cook

Personal details
- Born: 1 December 1920 Lévis, Quebec
- Died: 24 June 2005 (aged 84)
- Party: Progressive Conservative; Independent
- Profession: lawyer

Louis Fortin (1 December 1920 – 24 June 2005) was a Progressive Conservative party member of the House of Commons of Canada. He was born in Lévis, Quebec and became a lawyer by career.

He unsuccessfully attempt to unseat Jean Lesage at the Montmagny—L'Islet riding as an independent candidate in the 1957 federal election. Lesage resigned from Parliament in June 1958 to serve as Quebec's provincial Liberal leader. Fortin won a byelection at Montmagny—l'Islet on 29 September 1958 and served for the remainder of the 24th Canadian Parliament. Jean-Paul Cook of the Social Credit Party defeated Fortin in the 1962 election after which Fortin did not campaign again for a House of Commons seat.
