= Millet River =

River in Saint Lucia

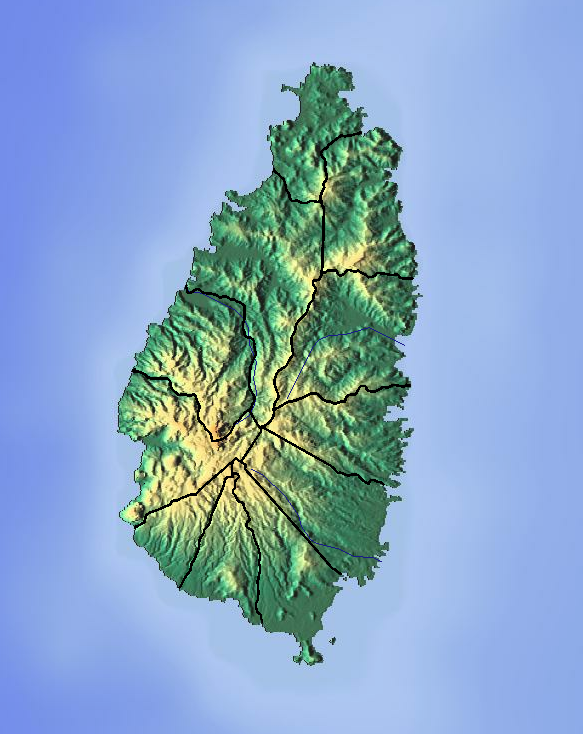
- Location of mouth

Location
- Country: Saint Lucia
- Region: Anse la Raye Quarter

Physical characteristics
- Mouth
  - coordinates: 13°55′29″N 60°59′22″W

The Millet River is a river of Saint Lucia.

== See also ==
- List of rivers of Saint Lucia
