= Jean-Charles Richard Berger =

Canadian politician (1924–2001)

- Official 1966 portrait

Member of the Canadian Parliament for Montmagny—L'Islet
- In office 1965–1968
- Preceded by: Jean-Paul Cook
- Succeeded by: Riding abolished in 1966 when it was redistributed between Bellechasse and Kamouraska.

Personal details
- Born: 8 December 1924 Ville Montmorency, Quebec, Canada
- Died: 11 February 2001 (aged 76) Laval, Quebec, Canada
- Party: Liberal
- Occupation: television & radio commentator, reporter

Jean-Charles Richard Berger (8 December 1924 – 11 February 2001) was a Canadian politician, television commentator, radio commentator and reporter. He was elected to the House of Commons of Canada in the 1963 election to represent the riding of Montmagny—L'Islet. He was re-elected in 1965 and defeated in 1968 in the riding of Kamouraska. He died in 2001 at the age of 76.
