= Royal Saint Lucia Police Force =

Law enforcement agency

- Abbreviation: RSLPF

Agency overview
- Formed: 1834
- Employees: 1,045

Jurisdictional structure
- Operations jurisdiction: Saint Lucia
- Area: 238 square miles (620 km^{2})
- Population: 175,000
- General nature: Civilian police

Operational structure
- Headquarters: Castries, Saint Lucia.
- Agency executive: Verne Garde, Commissioner of Police

Facilities
- Stations: 14

The Royal Saint Lucia Police Force (RSLPF) is the agency responsible for law enforcement in Saint Lucia. It was founded in 1834.

== Organisation ==
The Commissioner of Police is Verne Garde, who commands 957 police officers and civilian employees, in 14 police stations, who serve a resident population of 175,000. Each department or station is headed by a Superintendent of Police and an Assistant Superintendent of Police.

The RSLPF maintains two paramilitary sub organisations; the Special Service Unit, and the Coast Guard, both units are responsible for internal security. Defence is the responsibility of Regional Security System. There is only one non-policing organization under the command of the RSLPF, the Immigration Service.

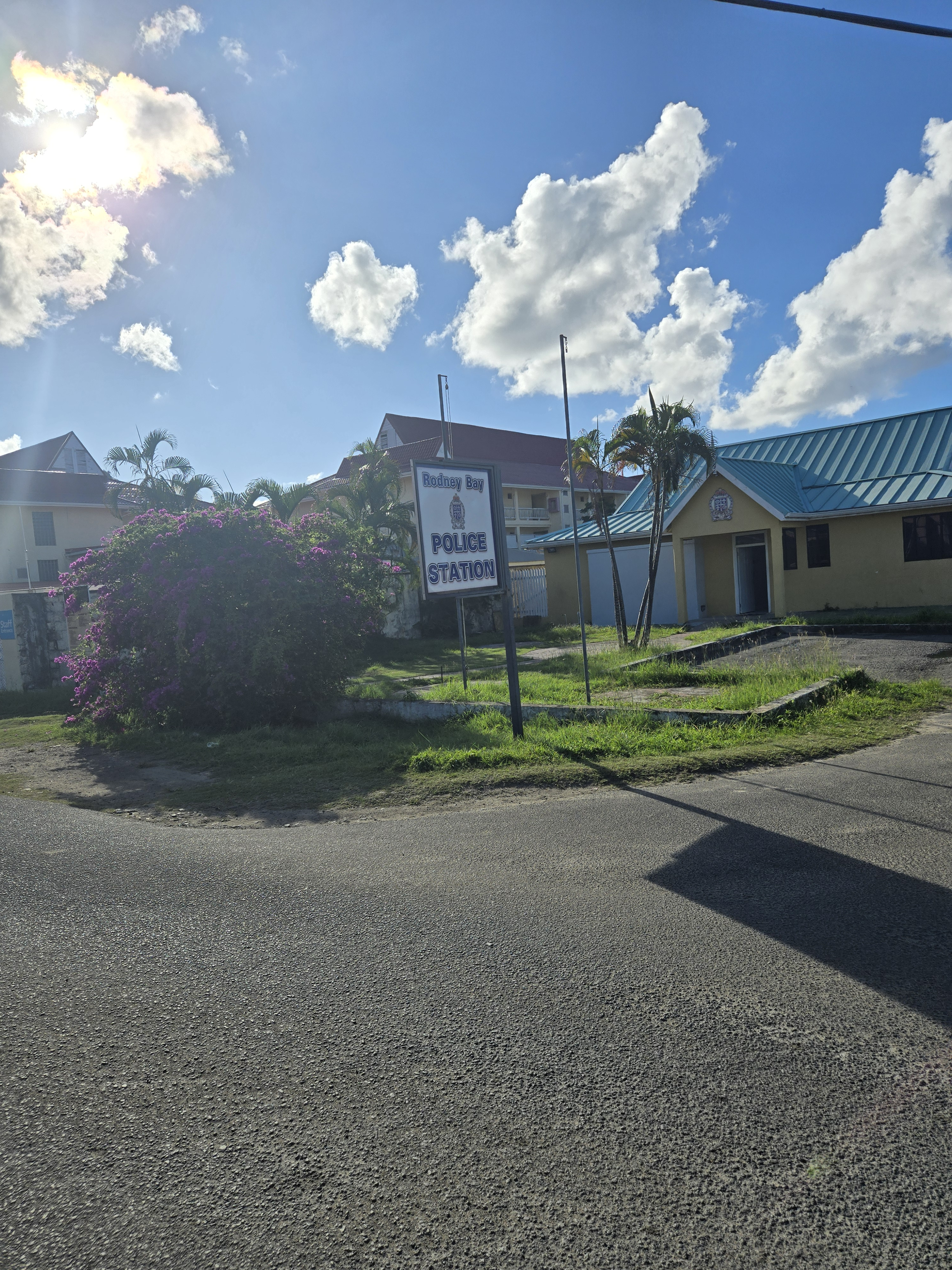
Police Station in Rodney Bay, St. Lucia

=== Police Band ===
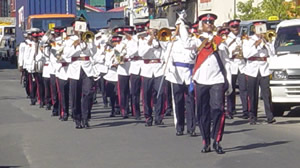
The Royal St Lucia Police Band

The RSLPF includes The Royal Saint Lucia Police Band, which is a specialised department within the Royal Saint Lucia Police Force. The Band consists of Police Constables (PC and SPC), as well as Trainee and Supervising ranks who specialise in Music and Arts.

The Band rank structure is that of the same as most units within the RSLPF. Most members hold the rank of Police Constable (PC and SPC) or above. These ranks carry out and conduct the duties and responsibilities of a State Commissioned Police Officer (Law Enforcement) with the exception being Band Cadets and Band Apprentices; both of which are trainee ranks not sworn to uphold the law by oath.

The RSLPB has hosted bands such as the Hampshire Band and the Royal Barbados Police Band. It is revered as one of the best-uniformed marching bands in the Eastern Caribbean. It was founded on 18 June 1947 under the direction of Nathaniel Griffith and consisting of 6 policemen. Since its establishment, it has increased sevenfold to the size of 42, a number that includes 4 females. The Band are well known for performances at state events such as the Independence Day Parade in Castries and Remembrance Sunday celebrations.

== Policing ==
In 2015 the Saint Lucia police said that they were under-resourced, with not enough police officers to keep up with the crime case load.

=== Operation Restore Confidence ===
The Saint Lucia police have been accused of keeping death lists and carrying out extrajudicial killings of suspected criminals in an attempt to make St Lucia more attractive to tourists. Shootings by police took place in 2010 and 2011 during a security drive called Operation Restore Confidence, which was aimed at reducing violent crime and boosting tourism following the murder of a British tourist.

A report by independent investigators from the Jamaica Constabulary Force in 2015 claimed that officers from the Royal St. Lucia Police Force staged a dozen killings of suspected criminals. The police then reported the killings as murders committed by unknown assailants, planting weapons at the scene. In August 2013 the US government suspended assistance to the Saint Lucia police in light of rumours of the extrajudicial killings. In June 2021, the United States restored assistance to selected units of the RSLPF, such as the Immigration and Marine Units.

=== Controversies ===
In May 2026, the RSLPF received strong criticism over the handling of the case of intimate partner violence that ended in the murder of Joy St. Omer at the hands of her former husband, who had been accused numerous times over the previous months of assaulting and harassing her. While the RSLPF launched its own inquiry into the killing, journalists, Saint Lucian society and the victim's family demanded an independent inquiry to clear responsibilities.

== See also ==
- Crime in Saint Lucia
- Military of Saint Lucia
