= Fernand Lizotte =

Canadian politician (1904–1996)

Member of the Legislative Assembly of Quebec for L'Islet
- In office 1948–1960
- Preceded by: Adélard Godbout
- Succeeded by: André Rousseau
- In office 1962–1970
- Preceded by: André Rousseau
- Succeeded by: Julien Giasson

Personal details
- Born: March 4, 1904 Lévis, Quebec
- Died: August 28, 1996 (aged 92) Saint-Jean-Port-Joli, Quebec
- Party: Union Nationale

Fernand Lizotte (March 4, 1904 – August 28, 1996) was a Canadian politician and a five-term Member of the Legislative Assembly of Quebec.

== Background ==
He was born on March 4, 1904, in Lévis, Chaudière-Appalaches and became a physician. He was an Action libérale nationale activist in the 1930s.

== Federal politics ==
He ran as a Reconstruction candidate in the federal district of Montmagny—L'Islet in the 1935 election and finished a distant third.

== Member of the provincial legislature ==
Lizotte ran as a Union Nationale candidate in the 1948 election in the provincial district of L'Islet and defeated Liberal incumbent and Premier Adélard Godbout. He was re-elected in the 1952 and 1956 elections. He did not run for re-election in the 1960 election.

He ran in the 1962 election and won against Liberal incumbent André Rousseau. He served as Deputy House Whip from 1963 to 1966. Lizotte was re-elected in the 1966 election.

== Cabinet Member ==
He was appointed to the Cabinet in 1966. He served as Minister of Communications until 1970 and as Minister of Transportation until his defeat in the 1970 election against Liberal candidate Julien Giasson.

== Death ==
Lizotte died on August 28, 1996.
