= Military of Saint Lucia =

Military forces of Saint Lucia

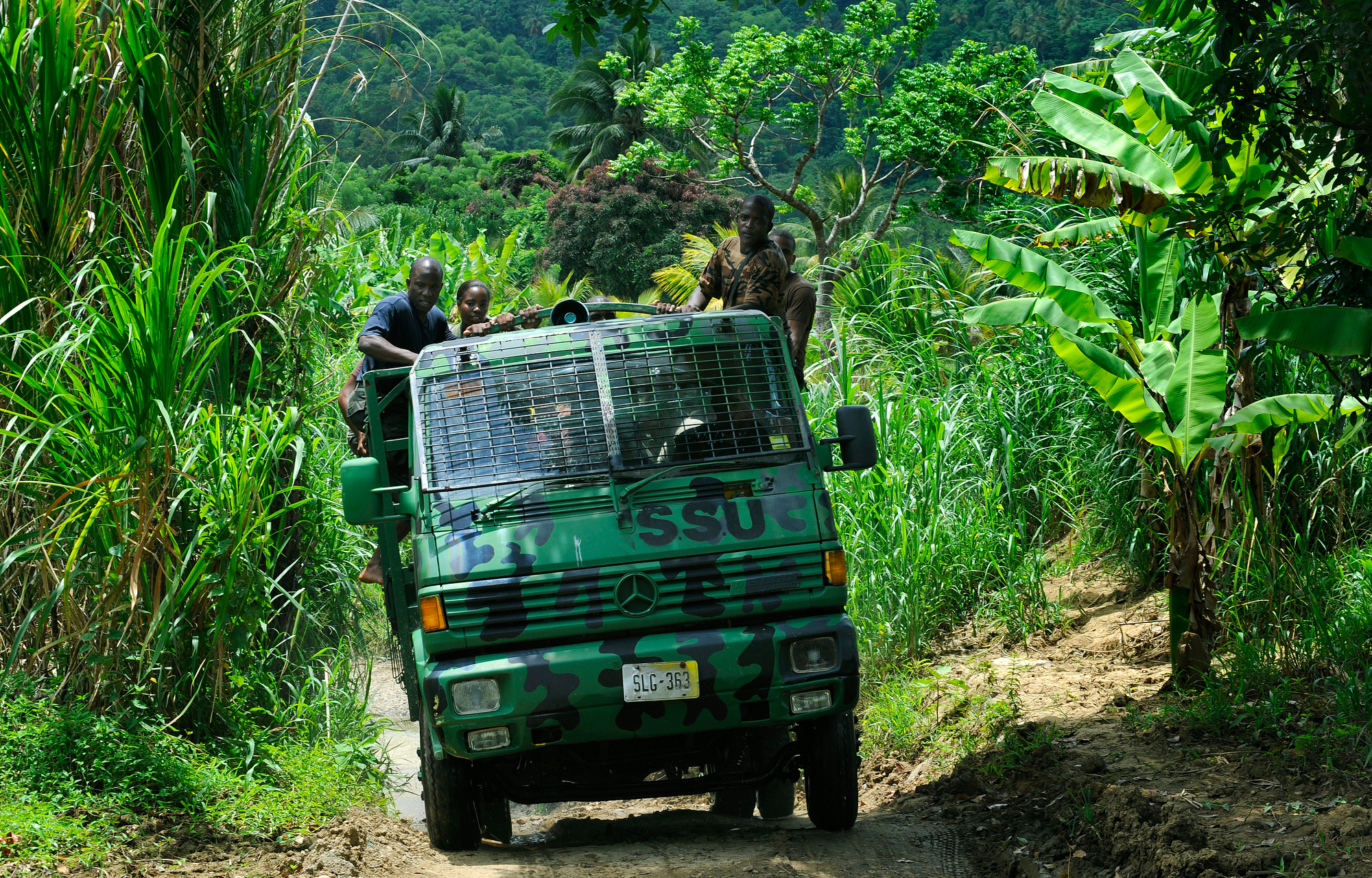
The Special Service Unit (SSU) of the Royal Saint Lucia Police Force during a training exercise in 2012

Being a small country, surrounded by other members of Caricom, St Lucia has no regular military force. However there is a Special Service Unit and Coast Guard as well as the Royal St. Lucia Police Force. St Lucia is a member of the Regional Security System and has good relations its neighbours and most of the world.

== Military branches ==
No regular military force; the Special Service Unit, and the Coast Guard, are both under the command of the Royal Saint Lucia Police.

== Active manpower ==
Approximately 116 men and women

== Military expenditures - dollar figure ==
$5 million (fiscal year 1991/92)

== Military expenditures - percent of gross domestic product ==
2 % (fiscal year 1991/92)

== Military partner ==
The Royal Saint Lucia Police Force receives training from the USSOUTHCOM. The United States Armed Forces considers St. Lucia as a partner nation in the Caribbean, along with Saint Vincent and the Grenadines.

== See also ==
- Saint Lucia
- Royal Saint Lucia Police
- List of countries without armed forces
- Regional Security System
