= Petronilla Deterville =

- Born: Marie Petronilla Deterville; 14 May 1951
- Died: 3 October 2010 (aged 59)
- Occupation: music educator
- Years active: 1981–2010

Petronilla Deterville, MBE (14 May 1951 – 3 October 2010) was a St. Lucian musician and composer recognized for her work in founding youth music and theatrical groups. She was honored as a member of the Order of the British Empire for her contributions to the development and preservation of St. Lucia's folk music, as well as her efforts to utilize the arts to expand educational opportunities.

== Early life ==
Marie Petronilla Deterville was born on 14 May 1951 in Anse La Raye, St. Lucia. After completing her primary education, earned a teaching certificate from the St. Lucia Teacher's College and went on to pursue certification as a music teacher from the Jamaica School of Music.

== Career ==
In 1981, Deterville founded the "Cecilian Reys", a musical group from her home town, which aimed to expand opportunities for youth in the area. The group, made up of children, learns and performs traditional St. Lucian folkmusic and musical theater. In 1992, she took the group to the Caribbean Festival of Arts (CARIFESTA), where they performed the folk musical, Tinday. Determined to further her education, Deterville enrolled at the Catholic University of America, completing a bachelor's in music education in 1995 and her master's degree the following year. In 1996, she developed the Anse La Raye Youth Orchestra, which had twenty-five musicians composed of strings, winds and drums.

Deterville had strong dedication to the arts and saw participation as a means of keeping children interested in school, as well as their communities. She worked with the Ministry of Education from 1989 to 2008 as a curriculum development specialist and participated in cross-cultural programs studying the benefits of incorporating ethnic music and folklore into educational programs. Deterville began an initiative in 2007 to involve at-risk youth in theater programs. Known as the Youth Studying Performing Arts and Culture (Youth SPAC) the initiative sponsored youth camps over the summer to introduce and involve students in the performing arts. Deterville and Kentilla Louis worked together to expand the program to produce productions year-round. The following year, she produced Tribute to Charles Cadet with the "Cecilian Reys" to honor the work of the St. Lucian tenor. In 2008, she became an education officer in the Ministry of Education, serving until her death. That same year, she was honored as a member of the Order of the British Empire for her contributions to music in St. Lucia.

== Death and legacy ==
Deterville died on 3 October 2010. Upon Deterville's death, Gregory Piper took over her work with the Anse La Raye Youth Orchestra, completing her production of Sing de Chorus. She was honored in 2016 with a special celebration held in honor of Nobel Laureate Week dedicated to her life. The "Cecilian Reys" performed Life in the Village a two-hour musical that Deterville had conceptualized.
