= Bordelais Correctional Facility =

Prison in Saint Lucia

- Interactive map of Bordelais Correctional Facility
- Location: Dennery, Saint Lucia; 13.8953°N 60.8945°W
- Status: Operational
- Capacity: 500
- Opened: 2003
- Managed by: Ministry of Home Affairs and National Security
- Director: Hilary Herman

The Bordelais Correctional Facility is the only prison in Saint Lucia. It is located near the town of Dennery. Built in 2003, it has a capacity of 500 inmates.

The prison housed 525 prisoners as of June 2017. In 2017, the prison population rate was approximately 279 prisoners per 100,000 citizens. Only about 2.5% of the prisoners were female, less than 1% were juveniles, and 3.0% were foreign. Almost half of the inmates are on remand or pre-trial detention. The literacy rate in Bordelais is only five per cent.

== Human Rights in Bordelais ==
Prisoners in Bordelais are allowed to have contact and visitation with their families. They are provided with educational programs and technical training. They are allowed to participate in recreational activities. The prison contains a farm that provides the majority of the prison kitchen's vegetables and herbs.

Although it is prohibited by the Saint Lucian constitution, prisoners and suspects have reported physical abuse by the police and prison officers. The abuse occurred during arrest or once the prisoners had arrived to the detention center. Between July 2015 and July 2016, over 100 complaints were filed against the police by civilians. The main complaint was abuse of authority. Progress on the complaints was not well monitored due to limited resources in the Office of the Director of Public Prosecutions.

== Education in Bordelais ==
Education in the prison, although provided, could be improved. The largest problem noted is that officers in the prison were not properly trained or fully staffed. Officers were also upset that the prisoners were being provided with free education when training for the officers was so expensive. The prison is also overfilled, and the lack of space prevents proper education.

== Notable inmates ==
- Primus Toussaint – accused of the murder of Joy St. Omer. Toussaint, who was the estranged partner of the victim, had already been arrested for assaulting and threatening her in the months preceding the killing.
