= Élisée Thériault =

Canadian politician

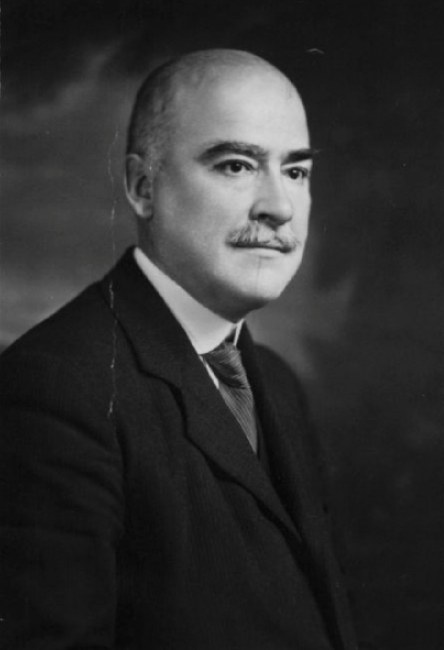

Member of the Legislative Council of Quebec for Kennebec
- In office 1929–1958
- Preceded by: Joseph-Édouard Caron
- Succeeded by: Ernest Benoît

Member of the Legislative Assembly of Quebec for L'Islet
- In office 1916–1929
- Preceded by: Joseph-Octave Morin
- Succeeded by: Adélard Godbout

Personal details
- Born: January 11, 1884 Saint-Alexandre-de-Kamouraska, Quebec
- Died: July 30, 1958 (aged 74) Quebec City, Quebec
- Party: Liberal
- Spouse: Cécile Hamel

Élisée Thériault (January 11, 1884 – July 30, 1958) was a lawyer and political figure in Quebec. He represented L'Islet in the Legislative Assembly of Quebec from 1916 to 1929 as a Liberal.

He was born in Saint-Alexandre-de-Kamouraska, Quebec, the son of Pierre Thériault and Marie-S. Saint-Pierre. Thériault was educated at the Collège de Sainte-Anne-de-la-Pocatière, the Collège de Lévis and the Université Laval. He was called to the Quebec bar in 1913 and set up practice in Quebec City. In 1914, he married Cécile Hamel. Thériault was named King's Counsel in 1924. He was a member of the municipal council for Quebec City from 1916 to 1918 and served as judicial counsel for the city of Quebec from 1918 to 1939. Thériault resigned his seat in the Quebec assembly after he was named to the Legislative Council of Quebec for Kennebec division.

He died in office in Quebec City at the age of 74 and was buried in the Cimetière Notre-Dame-de-Belmont at Sainte-Foy.
