= Charles Marcotte =

Canadian politician

Charles Marcotte (November 1, 1844 – September 20, 1901) was a notary and political figure in Quebec. He represented L'Islet in the Legislative Assembly of Quebec from 1881 to 1886 as a Conservative.

He was born in Cap-Santé, Canada East, the son of Félix Marcotte and Marie Delage. Marcotte was educated at the Séminaire de Québec and qualified as a notary in 1865, setting up practice at L'Islet and then Deschambault. He was secretary for the school board at L'Islet from 1870 to 1882. Marcotte was mayor of Deschambault from 1876 to 1879. He was married twice: to Céline Frenette in 1875 and later to Élise Matte. Marcotte was an unsuccessful candidate for L'Islet in the Quebec assembly in 1878, losing to Jean-Baptiste Couillard Dupuis. He defeated Dupuis in 1881 but was defeated by François-Gilbert Miville Dechêne when he ran for reelection in 1886. Marcotte died at Deschambault at the age of 56.
