= Joseph Bilodeau =

Canadian politician

Member of the Legislative Assembly of Quebec for L'Islet
- In office 1936–1939
- Preceded by: Adélard Godbout
- Succeeded by: Adélard Godbout

Personal details
- Born: August 9, 1900 Saint-Pamphile, Quebec
- Died: October 25, 1976 (aged 76) Sainte-Foy, Quebec
- Party: Union Nationale

Joseph Bilodeau (August 9, 1900 – October 25, 1976) was a Canadian politician and a one-term Member of the Legislative Assembly of Quebec.

== Background ==
He was born on August 9, 1900, in Saint-Pamphile, Chaudière-Appalaches and had a career as an attorney.

== Political career ==
Bilodeau ran as a Union Nationale candidate in the 1936 election in the provincial district of L'Islet and defeated Liberal incumbent and Premier Adélard Godbout. He was appointed to Premier Maurice Duplessis's Cabinet in 1936. He served as Minister of Municipal Affairs and Minister of Industry and Trade. He was defeated in the 1939 and 1944 elections.

== Death ==
Bilodeau died on October 25, 1976.
