= Saint-Éloi, Quebec =

Saint-Éloi
- Parish municipality
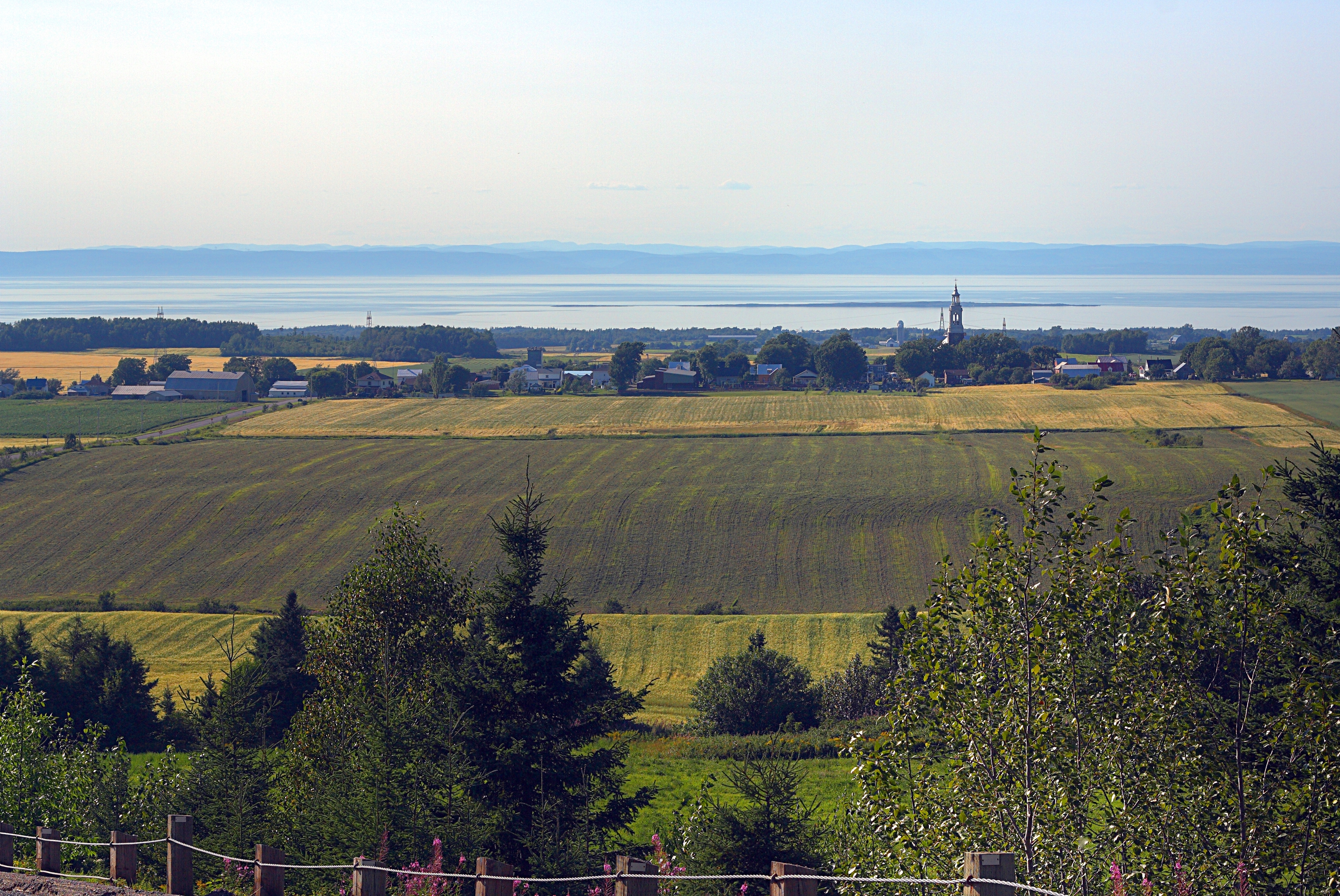
- Saint-Éloi seen from the hills

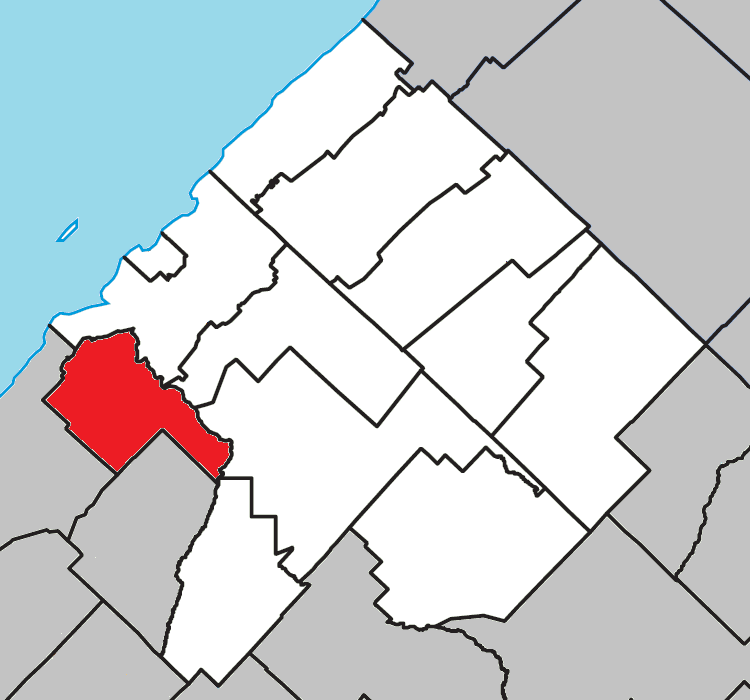
- Location within Les Basques RCM

- Location in eastern Quebec
- Coordinates: 48.03°N 69.23°W
- Country: Canada
- Province: Quebec
- Region: Bas-Saint-Laurent
- RCM: Les Basques
- Constituted: 1 July 1855

Government
  - Mayor: Yvan Pettigrew
  - Federal riding: Rimouski-Neigette—Mitis—Matapédia—Les Basques
  - Prov. riding: Rivière-du-Loup–Témiscouata–Les Basques

Area
  - Total: 65.90 km^{2} (25.44 sq mi)
  - Land: 65.77 km^{2} (25.39 sq mi)

Population (2021)
  - Total: 310
  - Density: 4.3/km^{2} (11/sq mi)
  - Pop 2016–2021: ▲8.4%
  - Dwellings: 151
- Time zone: UTC−5 (EST)
  - Summer (DST): UTC−4 (EDT)
- Postal code(s): G0L 2V0
- Area codes: 418 and 581
- Highways: No major routes
- Website: www.st-eloi.qc.ca

Saint-Éloi (French pronunciation: [sɛ̃t‿elwa]) is a parish municipality in the region of Bas-Saint-Laurent, Quebec, Canada. Its population was 310 in the Canada 2021 Census.

== History ==
On 9 March 1848, the parish of Saint-Éloi was canonically erected by separating an area from the parishes of Saint-Jean-Baptiste de L'Isle-Verte and Notre-Dame-des-Neiges de Trois-Pistoles. It was erected civilly on the following 13 June. Parish registers were also opened in 1848. The first parish priest was Thomas Aubert from Gaspé. Previously, the parish had been served by the parish priests of Trois-Pistoles and L'Isle-Verte. The first chapel was built in 1849 and in 1853, the post office was opened under the name of Saint-Éloi.

The municipality of Saint-Éloi was officially created on 1 July 1855. The municipality lost an important part of its territory in 1883 when Saint-Cyprien (then called Hocquart) was separated from Saint-Éloi. On 14 September 1924, the first cornerstone of the current church was blessed. On 15 September 1926, the first mass was celebrated in the current church.

== Demographics ==
Historical Census Data – Saint-Éloi, Quebec
Year	Pop.	±%
1861	1,397	—
1871	1,134	−18.8%
1881	1,193	+5.2%
1891	913	−23.5%
1901	970	+6.2%
1911	929	−4.2%
1921	900	−3.1%
1931	935	+3.9%
1941	902	−3.5%
1951	855	−5.2%
1956	837	−2.1%
1961	814	−2.7%
1966	697	−14.4%
1971	589	−15.5%
1976	502	−14.8%
1981	480	−4.4%
1986	404	−15.8%
1991	352	−12.9%
1996	340	−3.4%
2001	340	+0.0%
2006	338	−0.6%
2011	311	−8.0%
2016	286	−8.0%
2021	310	+8.4%

In the 2021 Census of Population conducted by Statistics Canada, Saint-Éloi had a population of 310 living in 136 of its 151 total private dwellings, a change of 8.4% from its 2016 population of 286. With a land area of 65.77 km^{2} (25.39 sq mi), it had a population density of 4.7/km^{2} (12.2/sq mi) in 2021.

Canada census – Saint-Éloi community profile

	2021	2016	2011
Population	310 (+8.4% from 2016)	286 (-8.0% from 2011)	311 (-8.0% from 2006)
Land area	65.77 km^{2} (25.39 sq mi)	66.11 km^{2} (25.53 sq mi)	66.80 km^{2} (25.79 sq mi)
Population density	4.7/km^{2} (12/sq mi)	4.3/km^{2} (11/sq mi)	4.7/km^{2} (12/sq mi)
Median age	54.8 (M: 54.8, F: 54.8)	53.8 (M: 55.2, F: 52.2)	48.9 (M: 49.0, F: 48.8)
Private dwellings	151 (total)	144 (total)	137 (total)
Median household income	$62,000	$47,104	$49,255

References: 2021 2016 2011

Canada Census Mother Tongue – Saint-Éloi, Quebec
Census	Total	French			English			French & English			Other		
Year	Responses	Count	Trend	Pop %	Count	Trend	Pop %	Count	Trend	Pop %	Count	Trend	Pop %
2021	310	310	▲8.8%	100.0%	0	0.0%	0.0%	0	0.0%	0.0%	0	▼100.0%	0.0%
2016	290	285	▼6.6%	98.3%	0	▼100.0%	0.0%	0	0.0%	0.0%	5	▲ n/a%	1.7%
2011	310	305	▼3.2%	98.4%	5	▲ n/a%	1.6%	0	0.0%	0.0%	0	▼100.0%	0.0%
2006	345	315	▼7.4%	91.3%	0	0.0%	0.0%	0	0.0%	0.0%	30	▲ n/a%	8.7%
2001	340	340	0.0%	100.0%	0	0.0%	0.0%	0	0.0%	0.0%	0	0.0%	0.0%
1996	340	340	n/a	100.0%	0	n/a	0.0%	0	n/a	0.0%	0	n/a	0.0%

== Notable people ==
Notable people born in Saint-Éloi include jazz musician Alain Caron, Quebec premier Adélard Godbout and NHL player Alex Belzile.

== See also ==
- List of parish municipalities in Quebec
