= Gail Rosseau =

American neurosurgeon

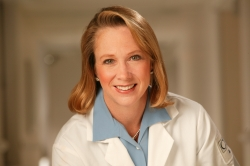

Personal details
- Born: Gail Linskey c. 1956 Raised in Chicago, IL
- Party: Democratic
- Education: George Washington University
- Occupation: Neurosurgeon

Gail Linskey Rosseau (born c. 1956) is an American neurosurgeon. She is a Clinical Professor of Neurosurgery at George Washington University School of Medicine and Health Sciences, Washington, D.C. Prior to this position, she was Associate Chairman of Inova Fairfax Hospital Department of Neurosciences.

== Biography ==
Rosseau completed her neurosurgical residency training at George Washington University in Washington, D.C., after graduating from its medical school. She completed a fellowship in cranial base and microvascular surgery at the University of Pittsburgh in Pennsylvania and a cranial base surgery fellowship at Val-de-Grâce in Paris, France.

== Professional work ==
Dr. Rosseau has become a leading advocate for Global Surgery, serving on the Board of Directors of G4 Alliance and frequently publishing and speaking at international medical meetings on this topic. Her practice includes a wide range of neurosurgery, with expertise in caring for patients with cranial base disorders. This includes extensive experience with pituitary tumors, meningiomas, acoustic neuromas, and head and neck malignancies. Her clinical practices have been focused on brain traumatic injuries with veterans specifically. She is the author over 150 peer-reviewed papers, invited lectures and courses in these topics, including a co-authored white paper with Women in Neurosurgery titled "The Future of Neurosurgery."

Rosseau is one of 300 female neurosurgeons in the United States, out of a total of more than 3,000 practicing neurosurgeons. She writes and speaks often in the U.S. and abroad on neurosurgical topics. Her most frequent subjects include innovative treatments for patients with pituitary tumors, trigeminal neuralgia, meningiomas and normal pressure hydrocephalus. She pioneered the use of minimally invasive endoscopic surgery for treatment of pituitary tumors. Her current research funding is for clinical trials in breast cancer metastasis and idiopathic normal pressure hydrocephalus.

== Candidate for Surgeon General ==
In December 2009, Rosseau was on a short list for then-President-elect Barack Obama's nomination for Surgeon General of the United States. On March 5, 2009, another candidate for Surgeon General, CNN medical correspondent Sanjay Gupta, announced he was withdrawing himself from consideration, thus strengthening speculation that Rosseau remained a primary candidate.

Rosseau’s association with President Obama dates to 2003. She served on the finance committees and women’s committees for both his senatorial and presidential campaigns. She also acted as his surrogate speaker on healthcare issues during the primary and general presidential election campaigns.

Her candidacy for Surgeon General has been supported by the American Medical Association, American College of Neurosurgeons, American Association of Neurological Surgeons, the Congress of Neurological Surgeons, and the American Association of Orthopaedic Surgeons in addition to a number of patient groups.

== Honors ==
She has served on the FDA Advisory Council for Neurological Devices in addition to a number of national and international leadership positions in organized neurosurgery.

Public broadcasting network medical programs "Second Opinion" and "60 Minutes II" have featured Rosseau, in addition to national and local network television and radio programs. She has been cited in articles from printed periodicals such as the Chicago Tribune, The Wall Street Journal, The Washington Post, Chicago Sun Times, and The Desert Sun. A March 2007 article in More magazine profiled her research into the connection between breast cancer and brain metastases. A profile on Rosseau appeared in the September 2009 issue of Ladies Home Journal.

In 2021, the American Association of Neurological Surgeons honored Rousseau with the AANS Humanitarian Award.

Professional affiliations and memberships

- Member at Large, Board of Directors, Association of Neurological Surgeons (AANS)
- Conseil Directeur Scientifique, Société de Neurochirurgie de Langue Française (SNCLF)
- Vice President, North America, World Federation of Neurosurgical Societies (WFNS)
- Past President, Women in Neurosurgery (WINS)
- Executive Committee, Foundation for International Education in Neurological Surgery (FIENS)

== Additional references ==
- "ABC News Reporter Bob Woodruff Raises Awareness of Traumatic Brain Injury (TBI)". Retrieved on July 2, 2009.
- "Richardson Died from Clot that Compressed Brain." Retrieved on July 2, 2009.
- "Spreading the Word about NPH." National Hydrocephalus Foundation. Retrieved on July 2, 2009.
- "Prevenir Les Lesions de la Colonne et de la Moelle Le Quotidien." Tunisia Today. Retrieved on July 2, 2009.
- "Fighting for a Future Pioneer Press Publication." Retrieved on July 2, 2009.
- "Saved From Senility." Retrieved on July 2, 2009.
- "Neurosurgeon Teaches Brain Facts, Fiction." Pioneer Press Publication. Retrieved on July 2, 2009.
- "Massachusetts Senator Ted Kennedy underwent surgery yesterday (M) to remove a brain tumor. After eight, Joy Cardin's guest neurosurgeon discusses recent advances in the treatment of brain tumors." Wisconsin Public Radio program notes. Retrieved on July 2, 2009.
- ThinkFirst International Spotlight. Retrieved on July 2, 2009.
- Rosseau, Gail, M.D. (April 27, 2004) "Keep Doctors Practicing in Illinois." Chicago Tribune. Retrieved on July 2, 2009.
