= Montmagny—L'Islet =

Former federal electoral district in Quebec, Canada

Quebec electoral district

Defunct federal electoral district
- Legislature: House of Commons
- District created: 1933
- District abolished: 1967
- First contested: 1935
- Last contested: 1965

Montmagny—L'Islet (French pronunciation: [mɔ̃maɲi lilɛ]) was a federal electoral district in Quebec, Canada, that was represented in the House of Commons of Canada from 1935 to 1968.

This riding was created in 1933 from L'Islet and Montmagny ridings.

It initially consisted of:

- the county of Montmagny, Île-aux-Grues and adjoining Islands, except such part of the said county of Montmagny included in the municipalities of Berthier and Saint-François-de-la-Rivière-du-Sud;
- the county of L'Islet, except such part thereof as is included in the municipalities of Ashford, Sainte-Louise, Saint-Roch-des-Aulnaies, Saint-Perpétue and Tourville.

In 1947, it was redefined to consist of:

- the county of Montmagny (except the municipalities of Berthier and Saint-François-de-la-Rivière-du-Sud), and the town of Montmagny and the municipality of L'Île-aux-Grues;
- the county of L'Islet except the municipalities of Ashford, Sainte-Louise, Saint-Roch-des-Aulnaies, Sainte-Perpétue, Tourville and the territory included in the parish of Sainte-Félicité.

In 1952, it was redefined to consist of:

- the county of Montmagny (except the parish municipalities of Berthier and Saint-François-de-la-Rivière-du-Sud), the town of Montmagny and the parish municipality of Saint-Antoine L'Ile-aux-Grues;
- the county of L'Islet (except the township municipality of Ashford, the parish municipality of Sainte-Louise, the municipalities of Saint-Roch-des-Aulnaies, Tourville and Sainte-Félicité) and that part of the parish municipality of Sainte-Perpétue included in lots 13 to 56 of Range VIII, Lafontaine Township.

It was abolished in 1966 when it was redistributed between Bellechasse and Kamouraska.

== Members of Parliament ==
This riding elected the following members of Parliament:

| Parliament | Years | Member | Party |
|---|---|---|---|
Montmagny—L'Islet; Riding created from L'Islet and Montmagny
| 18th | 1935–1940 | Fernand Fafard | Liberal |
| 19th | 1940–1945 | Léo Kemner Laflamme | Liberal |
| 20th | 1945–1949 | Jean Lesage | Liberal |
| 21st | 1949–1953 | Jean Lesage | Liberal |
| 22nd | 1953–1957 | Jean Lesage | Liberal |
| 23rd | 1957–1958 | Jean Lesage | Liberal |
| 24th | 1958–1958 | Jean Lesage | Liberal |
| 24th | 1958–1962 | Louis Fortin | Progressive Conservative |
| 25th | 1962–1963 | Jean-Paul Cook | Social Credit |
| 26th | 1963–1965 | Jean-Charles Richard Berger | Liberal |
| 27th | 1965–1968 | Jean-Charles Richard Berger | Liberal |
Riding dissolved into Bellechasse and Kamouraska

== Election results ==
1935 Canadian federal election
| Party | Candidate | Votes |
|---|---|---|
| Liberal | Fernand Fafard | 6,826 |
| Conservative | Thomas Tremblay | 4,611 |
| Reconstruction | Fernand Lizotte | 271 |

1940 Canadian federal election
| Party | Candidate | Votes |
|---|---|---|
| Liberal | J.-Léo-K. Laflamme | 6,890 |
| National Government | Wilfrid-A. Ringuet | 3,288 |

1945 Canadian federal election
| Party | Candidate | Votes |
|---|---|---|
| Liberal | Jean Lesage | 7,327 |
| Independent | Wilfrid-A. Ringuet | 3,028 |
| Social Credit | Roger Boulanger | 1,721 |

1949 Canadian federal election
| Party | Candidate | Votes |
|---|---|---|
| Liberal | Jean Lesage | 10,004 |
| Progressive Conservative | Georges-Henri Fafard | 2,380 |
| Union des électeurs | Étienne Caouette | 793 |

1953 Canadian federal election
| Party | Candidate | Votes |
|---|---|---|
| Liberal | Jean Lesage | 10,121 |
| Progressive Conservative | Roger Chamard | 4,876 |

1957 Canadian federal election
| Party | Candidate | Votes |
|---|---|---|
| Liberal | Jean Lesage | 9,772 |
| Independent | Louis Fortin | 6,637 |

1958 Canadian federal election
| Party | Candidate | Votes |
|---|---|---|
| Liberal | Jean Lesage | 8,689 |
| Progressive Conservative | Denys Dionne | 7,963 |

By-election on 29 September 1958 On Lesage's resignation, 11 June 1958
| Party | Candidate | Votes |
| Progressive Conservative | Louis Fortin | 7,796 |
| Liberal | Bernadin Blanchet | 6,516 |

1962 Canadian federal election
| Party | Candidate | Votes |
|---|---|---|
| Social Credit | Jean-Paul Cook | 7,629 |
| Liberal | Roger Fortin | 5,068 |
| Progressive Conservative | Louis Fortin | 3,599 |

1963 Canadian federal election
| Party | Candidate | Votes |
|---|---|---|
| Liberal | Jean-Charles Richard Berger | 7,096 |
| Social Credit | Jean-Paul Cook | 5,537 |
| Progressive Conservative | Claire Lizotte Pelletier | 3,292 |

1965 Canadian federal election
| Party | Candidate | Votes |
|---|---|---|
| Liberal | Jean-Charles Richard Berger | 6,389 |
| Progressive Conservative | Robert-B. Lafreniere | 4,450 |
| Ralliement créditiste | Jean-Baptiste Coté | 3,246 |
| New Democratic | Jean-Charles Chiasson | 341 |

== See also ==
- List of Canadian electoral districts
- Historical federal electoral districts of Canada
