= Petite Riviere de l'Anse La Raye =

River in Saint Lucia

Petite Rivière de l'Anse La Raye
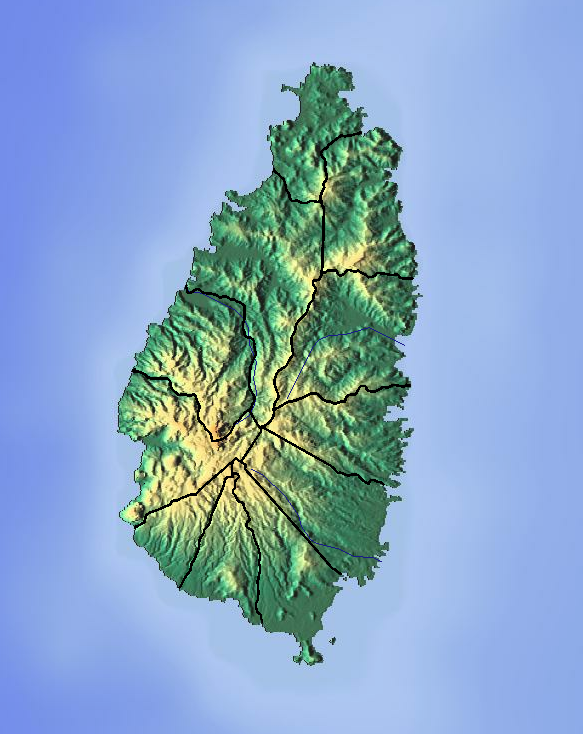
- Location of mouth

Location
- Country: Saint Lucia
- Region: Anse la Raye Quarter

Physical characteristics
- Mouth: Caribbean Sea
  - coordinates: 13°56′31″N 61°02′37″W

The Petite Rivière de l'Anse La Raye is a river of Saint Lucia.

== See also ==
- List of rivers of Saint Lucia
