= Île aux Pommes =

Island in Canada

- Location within Quebec

Geography
- Coordinates: 48.105359°N 69.322993°W

Administration
- Canada
- Province: Quebec
- Region: Bas-Saint-Laurent
- MRC: Rivière-du-Loup Regional County Municipality

L'île aux Pommes is a tiny natural island in the St. Lawrence River located in the region of Trois-Pistoles, in Bas-Saint-Laurent, in Quebec, Canada, some 250 km (160 mi) east of Quebec City. This island is therefore part of the province of Quebec (Estuary and Gulf of St. Lawrence), according to the Directory of Protected Areas in Quebec.

== Toponymy and location ==
The name of Île aux Pommes comes from the presence of cranberries during the time of New France, which were called "potatoes" at the time. One of the first mentions comes from an anonymous document referring to the diary of Louis-Joseph de Montcalm.

== Protection of the territory ==
Île-aux-Pommes Nature Reserve
- Interactive map of Île-aux-Pommes Nature Reserve
- Location: Quebec, Canada
- Established: 19 May 2004; 22 years ago
- Administrator: Gaston Déry

Steps have been taken in this direction by the owner and on 19 May 2004, the Île-aux-Pommes nature reserve was recognized as a protected area for a perpetual period by the Minister of the Environment, under the Natural Heritage Conservation Act. Île aux Pommes is the first island in the St. Lawrence Estuary to enjoy such status. This small piece of land and rock has belonged for four generations (1927) to the Déry family who devoted leisure and money to giving this part of the country an oasis of peace for the migratory birds that come to nest there.

These efforts were underlined by obtaining an award in 2007. The owner of Île aux Pommes, Mr. Gaston Déry, received the Phénix de l'environnement du Québec, for the enhancement of natural environments and of biodiversity.
