= Grande Rivière de l'Anse la Raye =

River in Saint Lucia

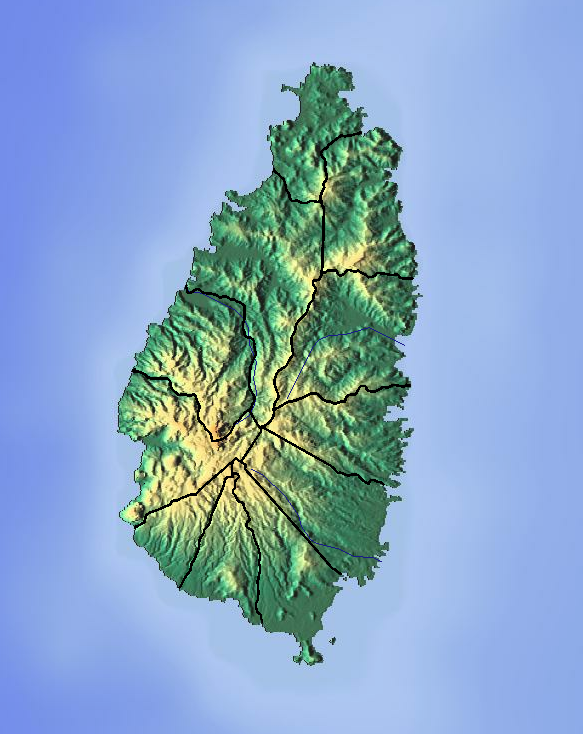
- Location of mouth

Location
- Country: Saint Lucia
- Region: Anse la Raye Quarter

Physical characteristics
- Mouth: Caribbean Sea
  - coordinates: 13°56′21″N 61°02′39″W

The Grande Rivière de l'Anse la Raye is a river of Saint Lucia.

== See also ==
- List of rivers of Saint Lucia
