= Rosseau, Haiti =

Rosseau
- Village
- Location in Haiti
- Coordinates: 18°21′2″N 73°36′39″W
- Country: Haiti
- Department: Sud
- Arrondissement: Aquin
- Elevation: 233 m (764 ft)

Rosseau is a village in the Cavaellon commune of the Aquin Arrondissement, in the Sud department of Haiti.
