= Anse la Raye District =

- District
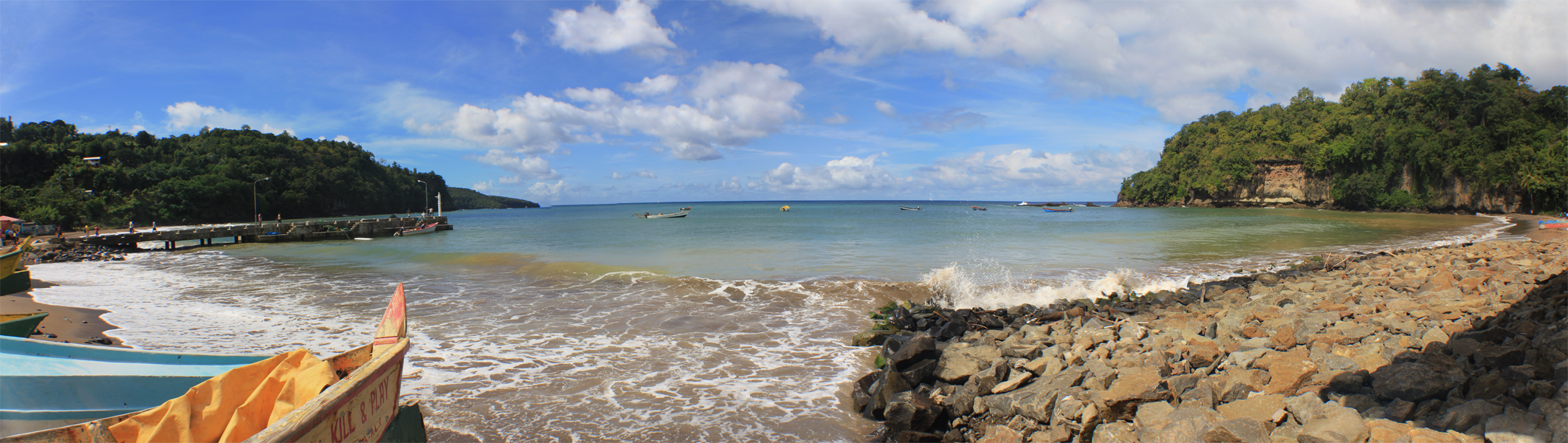
- Anse la Raye Bay

- Location of Anse la Raye District within Saint Lucia
- Coordinates (Town of Anse-la-Raye): 13°56′24″N 61°02′33″W
- Country: Saint Lucia

Area
  - Total: 37.6 km^{2} (14.5 sq mi)
  - Land: 31 km^{2} (12 sq mi)

Population (2010)
  - Total: 6,060
  - Density: 200/km^{2} (510/sq mi)
- ISO 3166-2:LC: LC-01

Anse la Raye District is one of 10 districts (formerly called quarters) of the island nation of St. Lucia in the Caribbean Sea. The name Anse la Raye is French for cover/bay of the rays, since there are a large number of skate fish or rays in the bay. In 2005/2010, the population of the district was 6,382/6,060 people, and they are mainly fishers and agricultural workers. The main town in the area takes the same name as the district and is located down the western coast from Castries, the capital of the country.

== History ==
In French colonial times, Anse la Raye was the site of sugar plantation, according to a plaque in a park in the town of Anse la Raye erected in 2010. There were as many as 107 estates in Anse la Raye in 1775, according to church records. During the French Revolution, slaves were freed and the name of the town was changed to L'Egalite. Slave were freed and the plantations were burned. Most people abandoned the land and turned towards fishing as a livelihood. Banana and coconut oil production became more important in the mid-20th century, as well as boat building. The area is known for feather racing boats and canoe races. In the late 1990s, a Friday Fish Night became a popular diversion in the town of Anse la Raye.

Severe hurricanes struck Saint Lucia in 1780 and 1817, destroying many ships moored in Anse la Raye.

== Geography ==
Rivers in Anse la Raye Quarter include:

- Grande Rivière de l'Anse la Raye, mouth: 13°56′21″N 61°02′39″W
- Petite Riviere de l'Anse La Raye, mouth: 13°56′31″N 61°02′37″W
- Roseau River, mouth: 13°57′36″N 61°01′57″W
- Millet River, 13°55′29″N 60°59′22″W
- Bois d’Inde Ravine, 13°56′45″N 61°01′01″W
- Anse Galet River, 13°56′05″N 61°03′00″W
- Ravine Saut, 13°55′11″N 61°01′11″W
- Ravine Bordeneve, 13°55′11″N 61°01′12″W
- Durandeau Ravine, 13°55′35″N 60°59′33″W

Bays (Anse) in the region include:

- Anse Pilori, 13°57′01″N 61°02′24″W
- Anse Galet, 13°56′10″N 61°03′04″W
- L'Anse La Raye, 13°56′26″N 61°02′45″W
- Roseau Bay, 13°57′36″N 61°02′05″W

There is also an Anse la Raye waterfalls with a height of about 15 m (49 ft) at 13°55′39″N 61°01′31″W.

=== Points ===
There are two points on the Caribbean Sea coast of Anse la Raye Quarter:

- Pilori Point, 13°57′23″N 61°02′17″W
- Pointe d'Orange, 13°56′33″N 61°02′43″W

=== Mountains ===
There are two mountains in Anse la Raye Quarter:

- Grande Rivière, 13°56′00″N 61°02′00″W
- Derrière Dos, 13°55′06″N 61°00′10″W

== Populated places ==
There are 27 second-order administrative divisions of the Anse la Raye District. These districts are used in census take to report population.

The following populated places are in Anse la Raye District:

- Anse La Raye, 13°56′24″N 61°02′33″W
- Au Tabor, 13°56′39″N 61°02′31″W
- Dame de Traversay, 13°55′15″N 60°59′16″W
- Derrière Lagoon, 13°56′34″N 61°00′57″W
- Durandeau, 13°55′35″N 60°59′37″W
- Massacré, 13°57′00″N 61°02′13″W
- Millet, 13°54′11″N 60°59′42″W
- Roseau Valley, 13°57′11″N 61°01′36″W

There are two localities in Anse la Raye District:

- Fond Eau Rouge, 13°56′45″N 61°01′46″W
- Anse Galet, 13°55′43″N 61°02′21″W

== Government ==
The seat of the Anse la Ray District is in the town of Anse la Ray.

The Anse la Ray District is represented in the House of Assembly of Saint Lucia by the Honorable Wayne D. Girard, Parliamentary Representative for the Anse La Raye/Canaries electoral constituency.

== See also ==
- Geography of Saint Lucia
- List of cities in Saint Lucia
- List of rivers of Saint Lucia
- Districts of Saint Lucia
