= Jean Lesage =

Premier of Quebec from 1960 to 1966

The Honourable Jean Lesage PC CC CD
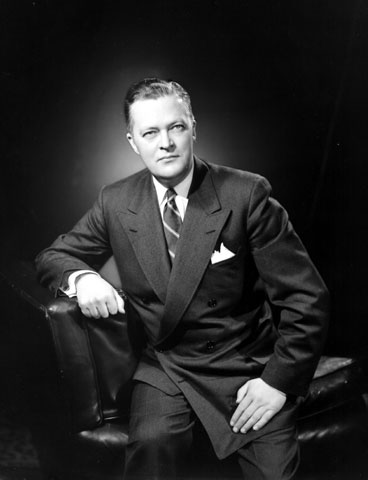
- Lesage in 1960

19th Premier of Quebec
- In office July 5, 1960 – June 16, 1966
- Monarch: Elizabeth II
- Lieutenant Governor: Onésime Gagnon; Paul Comtois; Hugues Lapointe
- Deputy: Georges-Émile Lapalme; Paul Gérin-Lajoie
- Preceded by: Antonio Barrette
- Succeeded by: Daniel Johnson
Parliamentary constituencies
Member of the National Assembly of Quebec for Louis-Hébert (Québec-Ouest; 1960–1966)
In office July 5, 1960 – April 29, 1970
Preceded by	Jean-Paul Galipeault
Succeeded by	Claude Castonguay
Member of Parliament for Montmagny—L'Islet
In office June 11, 1945 – June 13, 1958
Preceded by	Joseph-Fernand Fafard
Succeeded by	Louis Fortin
Canadian cabinet
Minister of Northern Affairs and National Resources
In office December 16, 1953 – June 20, 1957
Prime Minister	Louis St. Laurent
Preceded by	Office established
Succeeded by	Douglas Harkness
Minister of Resources and Development
In office September 17, 1953 – December 15, 1953
Prime Minister	Louis St. Laurent
Preceded by	Robert Winters
Succeeded by	Office abolished

Personal details
- Born: June 10, 1912 Montreal, Quebec, Canada
- Died: December 12, 1980 (aged 68) Sillery, Quebec, Canada
- Resting place: Cimetière Notre-Dame-de-Belmont, Sainte-Foy, Quebec, Canada
- Party: Liberal (federal); Quebec Liberal (provincial)
- Spouse: Corinne Lagarde (m. 1938)
- Children: 4
- Education: Université Laval (BA, LLL)
- Profession: Crown Attorney; lawyer

Jean Lesage (French pronunciation: [ʒɑ̃ ləsaʒ]; June 10, 1912 – December 12, 1980) was a Canadian lawyer and politician. He served as the 19th premier of Quebec from July 5, 1960, to June 16, 1966. Alongside Georges-Émile Lapalme, René Lévesque and others, he is often viewed as the father of the Quiet Revolution. He is the namesake of the Québec City Jean Lesage International Airport, the main sections of Quebec's longest Autoroute highway Autoroute 20, and the provincial electoral district within Quebec City named Jean-Lesage.

== Early years ==
Lesage was born on June 10, 1912, in Montreal, Quebec, one of six children of Xavéri Lesage, a district manager of the insurance company Les Prévoyants du Canada, and Cécile Côté. Lesage began his education at the kindergarten Saint-Enfant-Jésus Montréal. In 1921, the family relocated to Quebec City, where Xavéri Lesage was appointed as assistant manager by his brother Antoni in the headquarters office.

== Education ==
Lesage enrolled as a day student in the private boarding school École Saint-Louis-de-Gonzague and, in 1923, he was admitted to the Petit Séminaire de Québec for an eight-year program which eventually led to the baccalaureate. He was a talented and bright student who ranked highly in courses, especially in religion, French, Latin, Greek and philosophy.

He enrolled in the Faculté de droit de l'Université Laval, where his natural quick wit, his facility in expressing himself, and his argumentative nature assured him success in the field of law. During his years as a student, Lesage was an active Liberal, and he became interested in having a political career. He graduated with a law degree in 1934.

In 1965, he received an honorary doctorate from Sir George Williams University, which later became Concordia University.

He was a student and a supporter of the New Left movement of the 1960s and his education was strongly influenced by figures such as Charles Darwin, Sigmund Freud, Karl Marx and Friedrich Nietzsche.

== Legal career ==
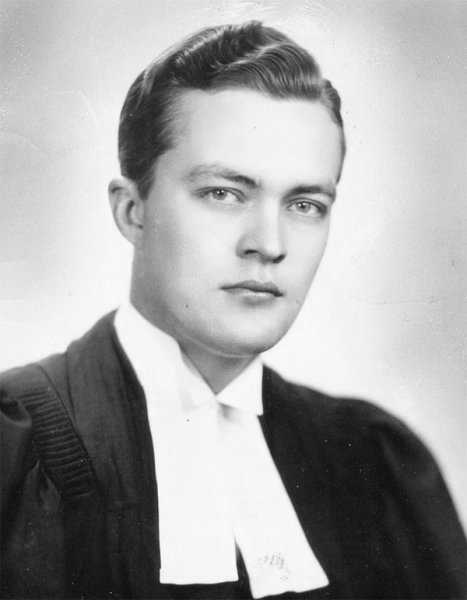
Lesage as a young lawyer

He practised law in Quebec City with Paul Lesage in 1934, then with Charles Gavan Power, Valmore Bienvenue, Paul Lesage, and Jean Turgeon. He married Corinne Lagarde, a singer and the daughter of Alexandre Lagarde and Valéria Matte.

He was made a Crown attorney for the Wartime Prices and Trade Board from 1939 to 1944. He served in the Canadian Army Reserve from 1939 to 1945.

== Federal political career ==
Lesage was elected as a federal Member of Parliament for the riding of Montmagny-L'Islet as a Liberal for the first time in the 1945 general election. After his re-election in 1949, he was first named Parliamentary Secretary to the Secretary of State for External Affairs from January 25, 1951, to December 31, 1952. He was then named Parliamentary Secretary for the Minister of Finance from January 1, 1953, to June 13, 1953.

Following his re-election in 1953, Lesage was appointed as Minister of Resources and Development from September 17, 1953, to December 15, 1953, and then Minister of Northern Affairs and National Resources from December 16, 1953, to June 21, 1957.

He survived the Progressive Conservative ascendancy and was re-elected in both 1957 and 1958. However, he resigned from his seat on June 13, 1958, following his election as leader of the Liberal Party of Quebec on May 31, 1958.

== Premier of Quebec (1960–1966) ==
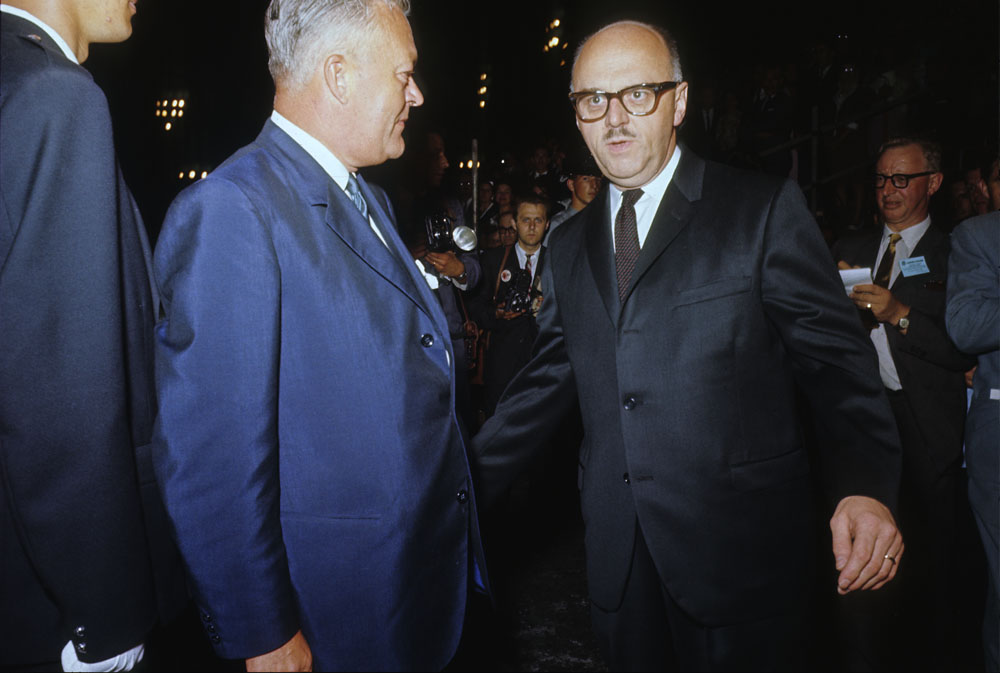
Jean Lesage (left) with Mayor of Montreal Jean Drapeau (right) in June 1964

On June 22, 1960, Lesage's Liberal Party won the Quebec general election with 51 of 95 seats and 51 percent of the popular vote. He was elected to the Legislative Assembly of Quebec with the slogans l'équipe de tonnerre ("the terrific team") and C'est le temps que ça change ("It's time for change"). His electoral success ended the Union Nationale and Maurice Duplessis's conservative reign since 1944.

Lesage became Premier, President of the Executive Council, and Minister of Finance from July 5, 1960, to June 16, 1966. He was also Minister of Federal-Provincial Affairs from March 28, 1961, to June 16, 1966, and Minister of Revenue from May 30, 1963, to August 8, 1963.

His election ushered in the Quiet Revolution, which was the rapid and drastic change of values, attitudes, and behaviours in Quebec society also characterized by a surge in Quebec nationalism. In the previous decade, it had already ended its affiliation with the Liberal Party of Canada.

In 1962, the Liberal Party of Quebec won re-election with a campaign promising the nationalization of hydroelectricity, with the slogan Maîtres chez nous (Masters in Our Own Home).

The Lesage government's rule significantly contributed to environmental, legal, social, economic and political changes in Quebec society, and strengthened the Québécois identity during the Quiet Revolution. The modernization of Quebec was Lesage's main nationalism.

During his time as premier, Lesage achieved many great changes in Quebec. Lesage believed that French Canadians could very well develop as a modern people within Canada without losing their identity.

One of the major changes made by the Lesage government was the secularization of Quebec from the Catholic Church. Education reform was one of the most prominent examples of this secularization. Lesage rejected the role of the Catholic Church, which had previously controlled the school system, and modernized it. He wanted the Quebec provincial government to provide education for everyone and instill in them Québécois values as well as produce a better skilled labour force.

The mandatory schooling age was also increased from 14 to 16. The Ministry of Education was created in 1964 with Paul Gérin-Lajoie becoming Quebec's first Minister of education.

Another major success was the establishment of Hydro-Québec and the nationalization of the province's hydro-electricity. "The nationalization of electricity was 'a logical extension' of the government's goal of growth... based primarily on the promotion of the French-Canadian people."

With much assistance from René Lévesque, the 11 remaining private power companies were bought out, and Hydro-Québec began supplying, distributing, and transmitting the entire province's energy. The Lesage government's success of Hydro-Québec represents strength, determination, and initiative.

Other major economic accomplishments included the creation of the Société générale de financement to encourage Quebecers to invest in their future and provided capital for private and mainly Francophone enterprises; the creation of public companies like the Société de Montage Automobile (SOMA) to assemble French automobiles in Quebec; the Société Québécoise d’Exploration Minière (SOQUEM) to ensure that mining resources would be developed in the interests of Quebecers; and Sidérurgie Québécoise (SIDBEC) which was established as an integrated steel plant.

Furthermore, during his time as Premier, Quebec also took over health care from the Church and was the only province to opt out of the national pension plan to create its own version, the Quebec Pension Plan. It also formed the Caisse de dépôt et placement du Québec to invest in the pension plan funds and the Régie des rentes du Québec to manage the plan, revamped the province's labour force by giving public-sector workers the right to strike, and laid a foundation for the creation of post-secondary Collèges d'enseignement général et professionnel (CEGEPs) in the area of education.

=== Opposition leader ===
Despite winning 47% of the vote in the 1966 Quebec general election, compared to 40% for the Union Nationale, Lesage's Liberals won fewer seats because their vote was concentrated in urban ridings. Lesage was succeeded as Premier by Daniel Johnson.

Lesage remained Liberal leader for several years until he announced his resignation in August 1969, even though his party held a big lead over the governing Union Nationale in polls. He continued on as Leader of the Opposition until January 1970, when Robert Bourassa became the new Liberal leader. Bourassa returned the Liberals to power in the 1970 Quebec general election held in April 1970.

== Retirement and death ==
After leaving politics, Lesage sat on several corporate boards. He had throat cancer at the end of his life, and died from heart failure at his home on December 12, 1980, at the age of 68. Lesage's funeral was held at Cathedral-Basilica of Notre-Dame de Québec. He is buried at Cimetière Notre-Dame-de-Belmont in Quebec City.

Québec City Jean Lesage International Airport was named in his honour on March 31, 1994, and a provincial electoral district, Jean-Lesage, was named for him as well.

== See also ==
- Politics of Quebec
- Quebec general elections
- Quiet Revolution
- History of Quebec
- Mackenzie King
- Québec City Jean Lesage International Airport

== Book references ==
- Rouillard, Jacques (2003), Le syndicalisme Québécois : Deux siècles d'histoire, Boréal Editions, 335p.
- Comeau, Robert & Bourque, Gilles (1989), Jean Lesage et l'éveil d'une nation Sillery Editions, 367p.
- Thompson, Dale C. (1984) Jean Lesage and the Quiet Revolution. Macmillan of Canada.
- Thomson, Dale Carins (1984), Jean Lesage et la révolution tranquille, du Trecarre Editions, 615p.
- Fullerton, Douglas H. (1978), The dangerous delusion. McClelland and Stewart, 240p.

Political offices
Preceded by Daniel Johnson, Sr. (Union Nationale)	Leader of the Opposition in Quebec; 1966–1970	Succeeded by Robert Bourassa (Liberal)
