= Roseau River (Dominica) =

River in Dominica

Coordinates: 15°18′N 61°24′W

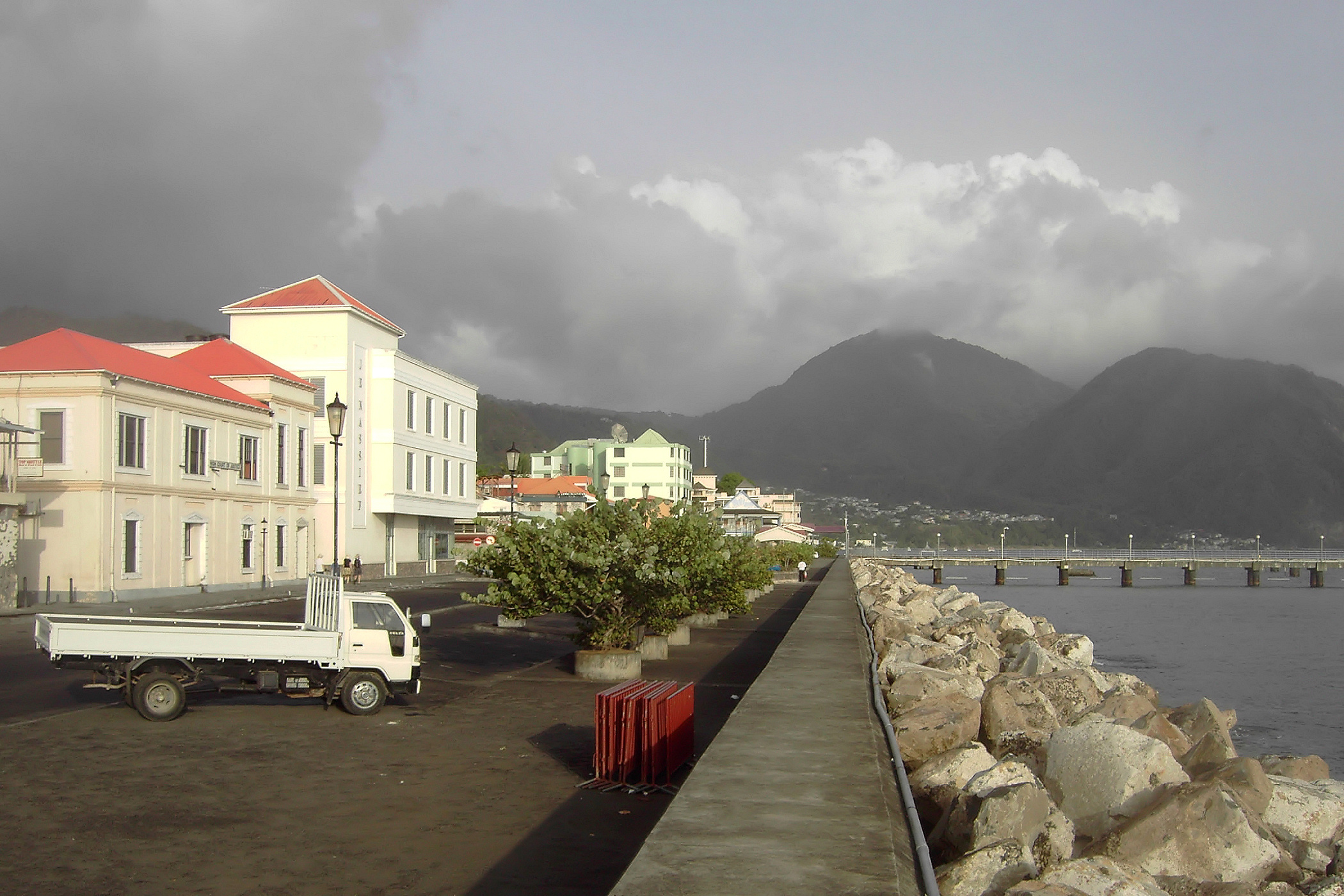
- The mouth of Roseau River.

Physical characteristics
- Source
  - location: Morne Micotrin
  - elevation: 4,001 ft (1,220 m)
- Mouth: Caribbean Sea
- Length: 13.6 km (8.5 mi)
- Basin size: 33 km^{2} (13 sq mi)

The Roseau River is one of the major rivers in Dominica. With a total length of 13.6 km (8.5 mi), it has a drainage basin area size of 33 km^{2} (13 sq mi).

It rises towards the south of the centre of the island, flowing southwest to reach the Caribbean Sea on the country's southwestern coast. The river runs through the nation's capital, Roseau.

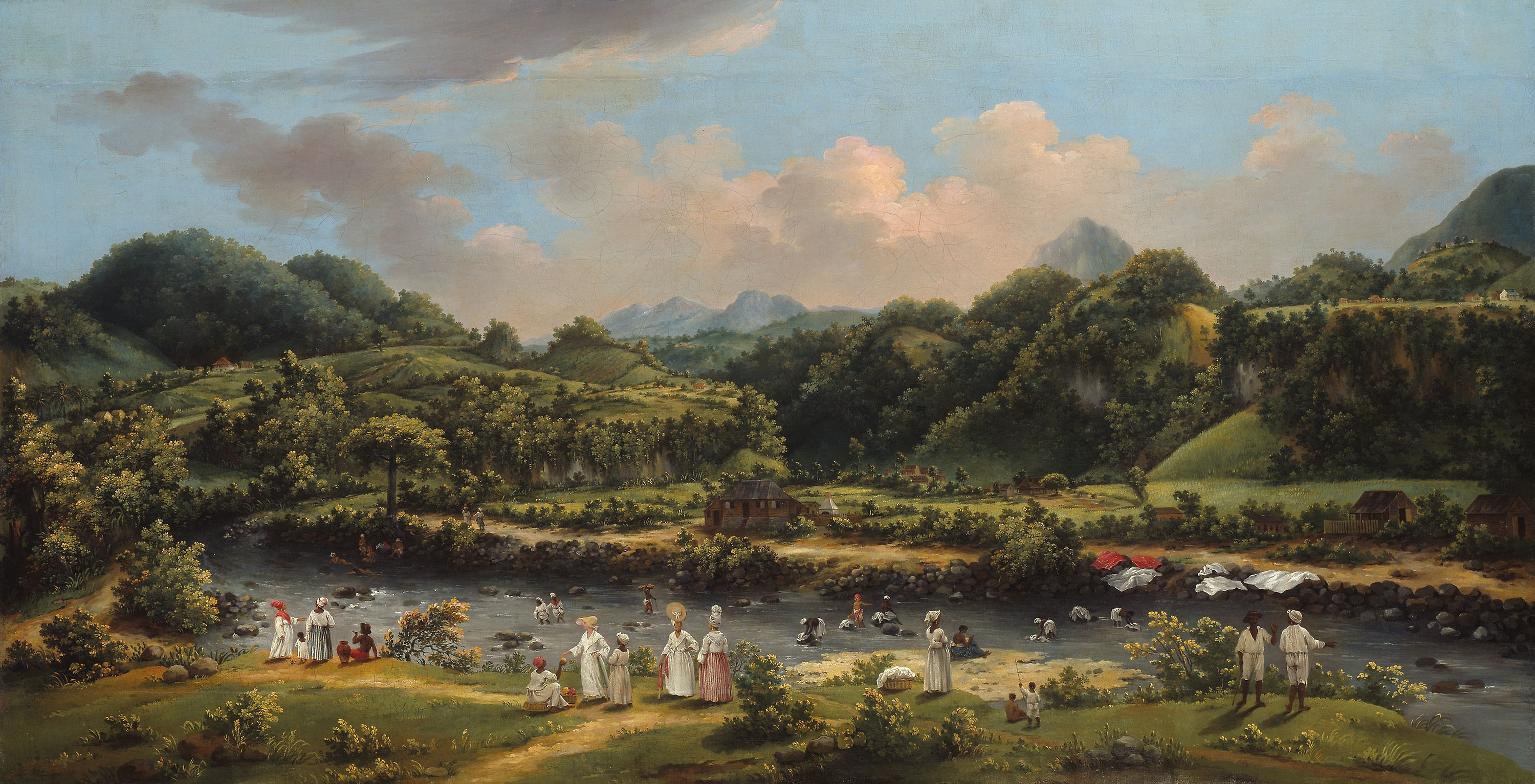
View on the River Roseau, Dominica in the 1770s. Agostino Brunias
