= Roseau River (Saint Lucia) =

River in Saint Lucia

Roseau River La Grande Riviere
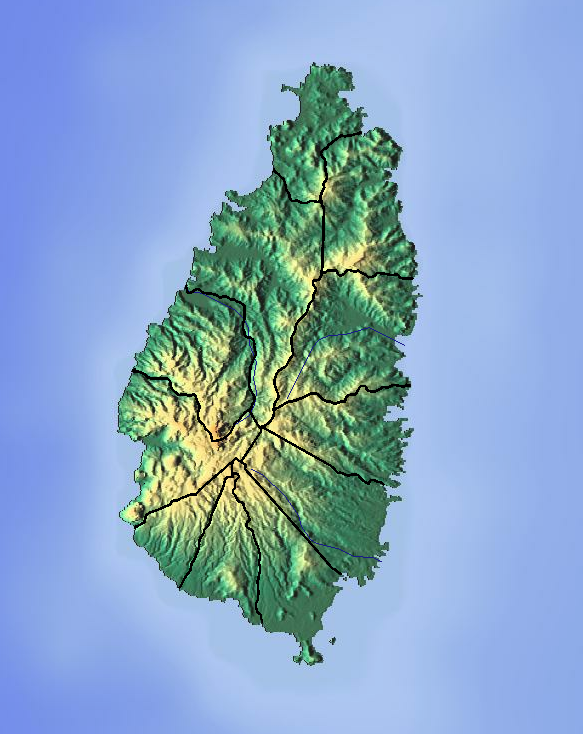
- Location of mouth

Location
- Country: Saint Lucia
- Region: Anse-la-Raye Quarter

Physical characteristics
- Mouth: Roseau Bay, Caribbean Sea
  - location: west of Roseau, Saint Lucia
  - coordinates: 13°57′36″N 61°01′57″W

The Roseau River is a river in the Anse-la-Raye Quarter of the island country of Saint Lucia. It flows north and then west from the central highlands in the south of the island, reaching the Caribbean Sea to the north of the town of Anse la Raye. The Roseau river is also the longest in the country and is dammed by the John Compton Dam near Millet.

== See also ==
- List of rivers of Saint Lucia
