= List of countries by incarceration rate =

Prison population rate. Includes jails too. Click to see yearly slider. Go to reference to hover a country for rate, year, and rate-per-year graph.

This is an alphabetical list of countries and some dependent territories and subnational areas which lays out the incarceration rate of each.

== Incarceration rates table ==
See the individual World Prison Brief (WPB) country and subnational area pages for more info on data, dates, and much more. WPB notes this: "As it is not possible to obtain meaningful comparative data on numbers of children in custody in different countries, we do not include juvenile imprisonment data in the highest to lowest lists."

- Note: Table data fully updated from Our World in Data dataset. It says it was fully updated Jan 21, 2026 from World Prison Brief. Some individual countries updated directly from WPB since then. OWID says its next expected dataset update is in January 2027.
- Note: Asterisk (*) indicates "Incarceration in LOCATION" or "Crime in LOCATION" links.

Incarceration rates per 100,000 residents
Location	Rate	Year
Afghanistan *	54	2024
Albania *	196	2025
Algeria	217	2021
Andorra	71	2024
Angola	65	2024
Antigua and Barbuda *	400	2023
Argentina *	284	2024
Armenia *	83	2024
Australia *	170	2025
Austria *	104	2026
Azerbaijan *	264	2024
Bahamas	336	2023
Bangladesh *	46	2025
Barbados	240	2023
Belarus	345	2018
Belgium *	113	2025
Belize *	302	2025
Benin *	144	2024
Bolivia *	252	2024
Botswana	161	2022
Brazil *	416	2024
Brunei	143	2022
Bulgaria *	99	2024
Burkina Faso	37	2024
Burundi	90	2025
Cambodia *	320	2025
Cameroon	118	2024
Canada *	90	2023
Cape Verde *	467	2024
Central African Republic	52	2023
Chad	56	2022
Chile *	329	2025
China *	119	2018
Colombia *	199	2025
Comoros	46	2023
Congo	27	2019
Costa Rica *	345	2023
Croatia	115	2023
Cuba *	794	2020
Cyprus	114	2025
Czech Republic *	179	2025
DR Congo *	46	2022
Denmark *	69	2024
Djibouti	74	2022
Dominica	356	2024
Dominican Republic *	219	2025
East Timor	55	2021
Ecuador *	196	2025
Egypt *	113	2022
El Salvador *	1659	2024
Estonia *	118	2025
Eswatini	369	2025
Ethiopia *	99	2020
Fiji	248	2024
Finland *	54	2024
France *	126	2025
French Guiana	321	2025
Gabon	226	2024
Gambia	22	2021
Georgia *	285	2025
Germany *	71	2024
Ghana *	41	2025
Greece *	98	2024
Greenland *	294	2024
Grenada	324	2024
Guatemala *	123	2023
Guinea	38	2024
Guyana *	288	2024
Haiti *	59	2025
Honduras *	188	2023
Hungary *	196	2024
Iceland *	35	2024
India *	37	2023
Indonesia *	96	2025
Iran *	228	2020
Iraq	179	2021
Ireland	101	2025
Israel *	217	2023
Italy *	108	2025
Ivory Coast *	94	2024
Jamaica *	124	2023
Japan *	33	2024
Jordan *	194	2022
Kazakhstan *	163	2024
Kenya *	100	2024
Kosovo *	99	2023
Kuwait *	101	2023
Kyrgyzstan	112	2023
Laos *	166	2018
Latvia *	175	2024
Lebanon	141	2023
Lesotho *	117	2025
Liberia *	60	2025
Libya	269	2023
Liechtenstein	20	2024
Lithuania	156	2024
Luxembourg	91	2024
Madagascar	95	2024
Malawi *	78	2024
Malaysia *	244	2025
Maldives *	225	2024
Mali	48	2023
Malta	119	2024
Mauritania *	57	2022
Mauritius *	215	2025
Mexico *	188	2025
Moldova *	255	2025
Monaco	81	2024
Mongolia	166	2023
Montenegro *	168	2024
Morocco	267	2023
Mozambique	63	2024
Myanmar *	183	2020
Namibia *	318	2021
Nauru *	345	2023
Nepal *	93	2025
Netherlands	64	2023
New Caledonia	186	2025
New Zealand *	199	2025
Nicaragua	332	2018
Niger	55	2024
Nigeria *	33	2025
North Macedonia	142	2024
Norway *	54	2025
Pakistan *	45	2024
Palau	367	2023
Panama *	533	2025
Papua New Guinea *	57	2023
Paraguay *	259	2025
Peru *	299	2025
Philippines *	151	2021
Poland *	191	2025
Portugal *	121	2025
Puerto Rico *	177	2022
Qatar *	69	2022
Romania *	129	2025
Russia *	197	2026
Rwanda	620	2024
Saint Kitts and Nevis *	296	2022
Saint Lucia *	310	2024
Saint Vincent and the Grenadines	361	2024
Samoa	179	2019
San Marino	44	2024
São Tomé and Príncipe	129	2023
Saudi Arabia *	140	2019
Senegal	76	2024
Serbia *	177	2024
Seychelles	392	2025
Sierra Leone	52	2024
Singapore *	178	2024
Slovakia *	149	2025
Slovenia *	69	2026
Solomon Islands	74	2024
Somalia	16	2023
South Africa *	260	2025
South Korea *	115	2023
South Sudan	58	2021
Spain *	121	2024
Sri Lanka *	180	2026
Suriname *	134	2023
Sweden *	92	2024
Switzerland *	77	2025
Taiwan *	270	2025
Tajikistan	145	2024
Tanzania	41	2023
Thailand *	395	2024
Togo	59	2021
Tonga *	516	2022
Trinidad and Tobago *	276	2021
Tunisia	267	2025
Turkey *	468	2026
Turkmenistan	576	2021
Uganda	150	2025
Ukraine *	116	2023
United Kingdom *	139	2025
United States *	542	2023
Uruguay	449	2024
Uzbekistan	85	2022
Vanuatu	68	2024
Venezuela *	199	2022
Vietnam *	135	2022
Yemen *	14	2022
Zambia *	137	2024
Zimbabwe *	150	2025

== See also ==
- Capital punishment by country
- Crime statistics
- List of prisons
- List of countries by intentional homicide rate
- List of U.S. states by intentional homicide rate
- List of U.S. states and territories by incarceration and correctional supervision rate
- United States incarceration rate
- Category:Penal systems by country

== Notes ==
- United Kingdom: The OWID dataset provides a rate for the UK as a whole, but not for its parts. UK is in the above table. The World Prison Brief (WPB) site does not provide a rate for the UK as a whole. WPB provides rates for subnational areas of the UK. Such as: England and Wales, Northern Ireland, Scotland, Anguilla, Bermuda, Cayman Islands, Gibraltar, Guernsey, Isle of Man, Jersey, British Virgin Islands. Their numbers are listed separately in the WPB highest-to-lowest lists and charts. The World Prison Brief site also has individual pages for each of them. To find those pages go to the main reference. Then go to the Data Analysis Tool. Use your browser "find" to search for any of the UK parts on the page. You should be able to find them all. The Europe region page also has links to most of them. The rate for the United Kingdom as a whole can be calculated by adding up their prison populations, and then dividing by their combined population. That must be what OWID is doing.
