= List of countries by intentional homicide rate =

The countries with the most homicides per unit population, 2021. Countries with high rates are generally those with small populations (shown with very narrow rectangles).

The list of countries by homicide rate is derived from United Nations Office on Drugs and Crime (UNODC) data, and is expressed in number of deaths per 100,000 population per year. For example, a homicide rate of 30 out of 100,000 is presented in the table as "30", and corresponds to 0.03% of the population dying by homicide per year. The reliability of underlying national murder rate data may vary. Only UNODC-vetted data is used in the main table to maintain consistency. In some cases, it may not be as up to date as other sources.

Homicide rates may be under-reported for political reasons.

A study undertaken by the Geneva Declaration on Armed Violence and Development estimated that there were approximately 490,000 intentional homicides globally in 2004, for a rate of 7.6 per 100,000. UNODC calculated a global estimated rate of 6.9 per 100,000 in 2010; 6.2 per 100,000 in 2012; 6.1 per 100,000 in 2017; and a rate of 5.61 per 100,000 for 2022.

== Definition ==
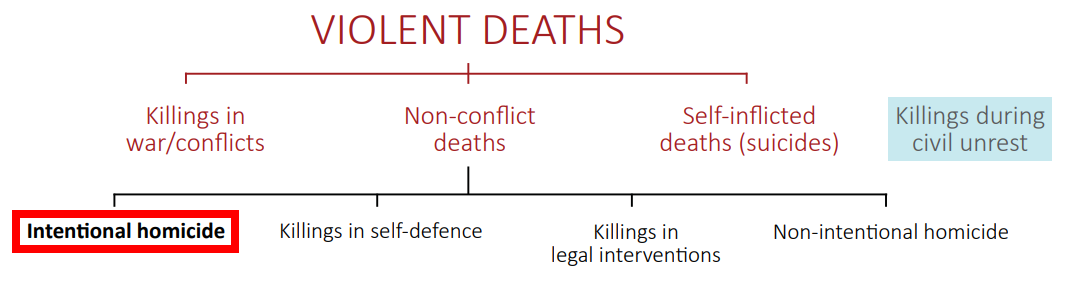
The class of violent deaths documented in this article is intentional killing of others outside of war. Deaths occurring during situations of civil unrest are a grey area.

Homicide rate

Homicide rate over time

The United Nations Office on Drugs and Crime (UNODC), which collects global data on intentional homicide, currently using the International Classification of Crime for Statistical Purposes, ICCS 2015, has offered details on the methodology and definitions used, and on the limitations which exist.

The UNODC in its 2013 Global Study on Homicide report stated that:

Within the broad range of violent deaths, the core element of intentional homicide is the complete liability of the direct perpetrator, which thus excludes killings directly related to war or conflicts, self-inflicted death (suicide), killings due to legal interventions or justifiable killings (such as self-defence), and those deaths caused when the perpetrator was reckless or negligent but did not intend to take a human life (non-intentional homicide).

Though some discrepancies exist in how specific categories of intentional killings are classified, the definitions used by countries to record data are generally close to the UNODC definition, making the homicide rates highly comparable at the international level. UNODC uses the homicide rate as a proxy for overall violence, as this type of crime is one of the most accurately reported and internationally comparable indicators.

Figures from the Global Study on Homicide are based on the UNODC Homicide Statistics dataset, which is derived from the criminal justice or public health systems of a variety of countries and territories. The homicide rates derived from criminal justice data (typically recorded by police authorities) and the public health system data (recorded when the cause of death is established) may diverge substantially for some countries. The two sources usually match in the Americas, Europe and Oceania, but there are large discrepancies for the three African countries reporting both sources. For the 70 countries (as of 2013) in which neither source was made available, figures were derived from WHO statistical models.

Deaths resulting from an armed conflict between states are never included in the count. Killings caused by a non-international armed conflict may or may not be included, depending on the intensity of hostilities and whether it is classified as 'civil unrest' or a clash between organized armed groups.

The World Bank Group stated with regard to statistics on intentional homicides per 100,000 people collected by UNODC that:

Statistics reported to the United Nations in the context of its various surveys on crime levels and criminal justice trends are incidents of victimization that have been reported to the authorities in any given country. That means that this data is subject to the problems of accuracy of all official crime data. The survey results provide an overview of trends and interrelationships between various parts of the criminal justice system to promote informed decision-making in administration, nationally and internationally. The degree to which different societies apportion the level of culpability to acts resulting in death is also subject to variation. Consequently, the comparison between countries and regions of "intentional homicide", or unlawful death purposefully inflicted on a person by another person, is also a comparison of the extent to which different countries deem that a killing be classified as such, as well as the capacity of their legal systems to record it. Caution should therefore be applied when evaluating and comparing homicide data.

== UNODC's global study ==
The regions and subregions in the table are based on the United Nations geoscheme since the table sources are United Nations Office on Drugs and Crime (UNODC) reports. See List of countries and territories by the United Nations geoscheme.

The U.N. recognizes that variability in the quality and integrity of data provided by certain countries may minimize country murder rates.

Rates are calculated per 100,000 inhabitants. Rates are to the 3rd decimal place in order to separate countries with low homicide rates.

- Note: When the regions or subregions are sorted the countries are also alphabetically sorted within those regions or subregions. Then shift-click the rate column head to secondarily sort countries by rates within the regions or subregions previously sorted.
- Note: Table last fully updated from data retrieved 24 February 2026 from UNODC. Individual countries updated since then.
- Note: Only UNODC-vetted data is used in the table.
- Asterisk (*) in Location column indicates a Crime in LOCATION article.

Intentional homicide rates per 100,000 inhabitants.
Location	Rate	Year	Region	Subregion
Afghanistan *	4.224	2023	Asia	Southern Asia
Albania *	1.755	2024	Europe	Southern Europe
Algeria	1.382	2024	Africa	Northern Africa
American Samoa	0	2019	Oceania	Polynesia
Andorra	2.585	2020	Europe	Southern Europe
Angola	4.098	2016	Africa	Sub-Saharan Africa
Anguilla	29.136	2014	Americas	Latin America and the Caribbean
Antigua and Barbuda *	12.797	2024	Americas	Latin America and the Caribbean
Argentina *	3.943	2024	Americas	Latin America and the Caribbean
Armenia *	2.186	2024	Asia	Western Asia
Aruba	1.935	2014	Americas	Latin America and the Caribbean
Australia *	0.943	2024	Oceania	Australia and New Zealand
Austria *	0.987	2024	Europe	Western Europe
Azerbaijan *	1.993	2024	Asia	Western Asia
Bahamas	29.904	2024	Americas	Latin America and the Caribbean
Bahrain *	0.196	2022	Asia	Western Asia
Bangladesh *	1.763	2023	Asia	Southern Asia
Barbados	7.434	2024	Americas	Latin America and the Caribbean
Belarus	1.535	2024	Europe	Eastern Europe
Belgium *	1.080	2021	Europe	Western Europe
Belize *	28.058	2022	Americas	Latin America and the Caribbean
Bermuda	6.183	2023	Americas	Northern America
Bhutan *	2.468	2020	Asia	Southern Asia
Bolivia *	3.649	2024	Americas	Latin America and the Caribbean
Bosnia and Herzegovina	0.980	2024	Europe	Southern Europe
Botswana	12.983	2023	Africa	Sub-Saharan Africa
Brazil *	18.691	2024	Americas	Latin America and the Caribbean
British Virgin Islands	8.166	2006	Americas	Latin America and the Caribbean
Brunei	0.486	2013	Asia	South-eastern Asia
Bulgaria *	1.169	2024	Europe	Eastern Europe
Burundi	5.650	2016	Africa	Sub-Saharan Africa
Cambodia *	1.820	2011	Asia	South-eastern Asia
Cameroon	6.760	2022	Africa	Sub-Saharan Africa
Canada *	1.983	2024	Americas	Northern America
Cape Verde *	6.995	2020	Africa	Sub-Saharan Africa
Cayman Islands	4.368	2020	Americas	Latin America and the Caribbean
Channel Islands	0	2010	Europe	Northern Europe
Chile *	6.107	2024	Americas	Latin America and the Caribbean
China *	0.502	2020	Asia	Eastern Asia
Colombia *	24.354	2024	Americas	Latin America and the Caribbean
Cook Islands	3.556	2012	Oceania	Polynesia
Costa Rica *	17.115	2024	Americas	Latin America and the Caribbean
Croatia	1.006	2024	Europe	Southern Europe
Cuba *	4.463	2019	Americas	Latin America and the Caribbean
Curaçao	16.920	2007	Americas	Latin America and the Caribbean
Cyprus	0.957	2024	Asia	Western Asia
Czech Republic *	0.615	2024	Europe	Eastern Europe
Denmark *	0.836	2024	Europe	Northern Europe
Dominica	18.126	2024	Americas	Latin America and the Caribbean
Dominican Republic *	9.118	2024	Americas	Latin America and the Caribbean
Ecuador *	38.940	2024	Americas	Latin America and the Caribbean
Egypt *	1.312	2017	Africa	Northern Africa
El Salvador *	3.297	2024	Americas	Latin America and the Caribbean
Eritrea	15.608	2012	Africa	Sub-Saharan Africa
Estonia *	1.764	2024	Europe	Northern Europe
Eswatini	13.679	2024	Africa	Sub-Saharan Africa
Ethiopia *	8.511	2012	Africa	Sub-Saharan Africa
Fiji	2.369	2024	Oceania	Melanesia
Finland *	0.928	2023	Europe	Northern Europe
France *	1.325	2024	Europe	Western Europe
French Guiana	13.388	2020	Americas	Latin America and the Caribbean
French Polynesia	0.371	2009	Oceania	Polynesia
Georgia *	2.028	2019	Asia	Western Asia
Germany *	0.921	2024	Europe	Western Europe
Ghana *	1.831	2022	Africa	Sub-Saharan Africa
Gibraltar *	0	2024	Europe	Southern Europe
Greece *	0.846	2024	Europe	Southern Europe
Greenland *	5.351	2016	Americas	Northern America
Grenada	13.666	2023	Americas	Latin America and the Caribbean
Guadeloupe *	5.684	2016	Americas	Latin America and the Caribbean
Guam	4.326	2019	Oceania	Micronesia
Guatemala *	22.758	2024	Americas	Latin America and the Caribbean
Guinea-Bissau	1.119	2017	Africa	Sub-Saharan Africa
Guyana *	14.078	2024	Americas	Latin America and the Caribbean
Haiti *	64.336	2024	Americas	Latin America and the Caribbean
Holy See *	0	2024	Europe	Southern Europe
Honduras *	23.915	2024	Americas	Latin America and the Caribbean
Hong Kong *	0.376	2023	Asia	Eastern Asia
Hungary *	0.703	2024	Europe	Eastern Europe
Iceland *	2.034	2024	Europe	Northern Europe
India *	2.716	2023	Asia	Southern Asia
Indonesia *	0.415	2024	Asia	South-eastern Asia
Iran *	2.375	2014	Asia	Southern Asia
Iraq	9.464	2013	Asia	Western Asia
Iraq (Central Iraq)	15.397	2021	Asia	Western Asia
Iraq (Kurdistan Region)	2.246	2013	Asia	Western Asia
Ireland	0.704	2024	Europe	Northern Europe
Isle of Man	0	2016	Europe	Northern Europe
Israel *	3.718	2024	Asia	Western Asia
Italy *	0.566	2024	Europe	Southern Europe
Jamaica *	40.364	2024	Americas	Latin America and the Caribbean
Japan *	0.229	2024	Asia	Eastern Asia
Jordan *	0.840	2024	Asia	Western Asia
Kazakhstan *	2.551	2022	Asia	Central Asia
Kenya *	4.650	2024	Africa	Sub-Saharan Africa
Kiribati	7.125	2012	Oceania	Micronesia
Kosovo *	1.895	2021	Europe	Southern Europe
Kuwait *	0.784	2022	Asia	Western Asia
Latvia *	2.778	2024	Europe	Northern Europe
Lebanon	2.635	2024	Asia	Western Asia
Lesotho *	22.204	2024	Africa	Sub-Saharan Africa
Liberia *	3.087	2012	Africa	Sub-Saharan Africa
Liechtenstein	2.508	2024	Europe	Western Europe
Lithuania	2.658	2024	Europe	Northern Europe
Luxembourg	1.531	2022	Europe	Western Europe
Macau *	0.139	2024	Asia	Eastern Asia
Malawi *	1.776	2012	Africa	Sub-Saharan Africa
Malaysia *	0.686	2024	Asia	South-eastern Asia
Maldives *	0.615	2019	Asia	Southern Asia
Malta	0.927	2024	Europe	Southern Europe
Marshall Islands	4.192	1994	Oceania	Micronesia
Martinique	2.753	2009	Americas	Latin America and the Caribbean
Mauritania *	1.000	2020	Africa	Sub-Saharan Africa
Mauritius *	2.675	2024	Africa	Sub-Saharan Africa
Mayotte	5.944	2009	Africa	Sub-Saharan Africa
Mexico *	25.638	2024	Americas	Latin America and the Caribbean
Federated States of Micronesia	0.907	2019	Oceania	Micronesia
Moldova *	2.010	2024	Europe	Eastern Europe
Monaco	0	2008	Europe	Western Europe
Mongolia	5.639	2024	Asia	Eastern Asia
Montenegro *	2.506	2024	Europe	Southern Europe
Montserrat	0	2018	Americas	Latin America and the Caribbean
Morocco	1.667	2024	Africa	Northern Africa
Mozambique	3.590	2011	Africa	Sub-Saharan Africa
Myanmar *	3.903	2022	Asia	South-eastern Asia
Namibia *	11.208	2021	Africa	Sub-Saharan Africa
Nepal *	2.130	2020	Asia	Southern Asia
Netherlands	0.658	2024	Europe	Western Europe
New Caledonia	3.110	2009	Oceania	Melanesia
New Zealand *	1.461	2022	Oceania	Australia and New Zealand
Nicaragua	5.452	2023	Americas	Latin America and the Caribbean
Niger	4.418	2012	Africa	Sub-Saharan Africa
Nigeria *	15.747	2023	Africa	Sub-Saharan Africa
North Macedonia	1.262	2024	Europe	Southern Europe
Northern Ireland *	0.521	2023	Europe	Northern Europe
Norway *	0.699	2024	Europe	Northern Europe
Oman *	0.139	2023	Asia	Western Asia
Pakistan *	4.329	2024	Asia	Southern Asia
Palau	11.227	2018	Oceania	Micronesia
Palestine *	0.273	2024	Asia	Western Asia
Panama *	12.778	2024	Americas	Latin America and the Caribbean
Papua New Guinea *	9.340	2010	Oceania	Melanesia
Paraguay *	6.884	2024	Americas	Latin America and the Caribbean
Peru *	8.605	2021	Americas	Latin America and the Caribbean
Philippines *	4.312	2024	Asia	South-eastern Asia
Poland *	0.677	2024	Europe	Eastern Europe
Portugal *	0.709	2023	Europe	Southern Europe
Puerto Rico *	15.206	2024	Americas	Latin America and the Caribbean
Qatar *	0.069	2022	Asia	Western Asia
Réunion	1.789	2009	Africa	Sub-Saharan Africa
Romania *	1.120	2024	Europe	Eastern Europe
Russia *	7.821	2024	Europe	Eastern Europe
Rwanda	3.612	2020	Africa	Sub-Saharan Africa
Saint Helena	0	2009	Africa	Sub-Saharan Africa
Saint Kitts and Nevis *	59.774	2024	Americas	Latin America and the Caribbean
Saint Lucia *	40.613	2024	Americas	Latin America and the Caribbean
Saint Martin	26.900	2016	Americas	Latin America and the Caribbean
Saint Pierre and Miquelon	16.585	2009	Americas	Northern America
Saint Vincent and the Grenadines	50.688	2024	Americas	Latin America and the Caribbean
Samoa	6.263	2018	Oceania	Polynesia
San Marino	0	2011	Europe	Southern Europe
São Tomé and Príncipe	3.232	2011	Africa	Sub-Saharan Africa
Saudi Arabia *	0.801	2024	Asia	Western Asia
Scotland *	1.038	2023	Europe	Northern Europe
Serbia *	0.891	2024	Europe	Southern Europe
Seychelles	7.967	2022	Africa	Sub-Saharan Africa
Sierra Leone	2.224	2020	Africa	Sub-Saharan Africa
Singapore *	0.171	2024	Asia	South-eastern Asia
Slovakia *	1.071	2024	Europe	Eastern Europe
Slovenia *	0.708	2024	Europe	Southern Europe
Solomon Islands	3.734	2008	Oceania	Melanesia
South Africa *	39.719	2024	Africa	Sub-Saharan Africa
South Korea *	0.489	2024	Asia	Eastern Asia
South Sudan	13.983	2012	Africa	Sub-Saharan Africa
Spain *	0.728	2024	Europe	Southern Europe
Sri Lanka *	2.509	2022	Asia	Southern Asia
Suriname *	4.256	2024	Americas	Latin America and the Caribbean
Sweden *	0.867	2024	Europe	Northern Europe
Switzerland *	0.504	2024	Europe	Western Europe
Syria	2.059	2010	Asia	Western Asia
Tajikistan	0.892	2020	Asia	Central Asia
Tanzania	3.301	2024	Africa	Sub-Saharan Africa
Thailand *	4.792	2011	Asia	South-eastern Asia
Timor-Leste	4.066	2015	Asia	South-eastern Asia
Tonga *	0.946	2019	Oceania	Polynesia
Trinidad and Tobago *	41.518	2024	Americas	Latin America and the Caribbean
Tunisia	4.693	2020	Africa	Northern Africa
Turkey *	2.412	2024	Asia	Western Asia
Turkmenistan	1.014	2015	Asia	Central Asia
Turks and Caicos Islands	103.149	2024	Americas	Latin America and the Caribbean
Tuvalu *	0	2019	Oceania	Polynesia
Uganda	8.819	2024	Africa	Sub-Saharan Africa
Ukraine *	3.777	2021	Europe	Eastern Europe
United Arab Emirates *	0.517	2023	Asia	Western Asia
United Kingdom (England and Wales) *	0.930	2023	Europe	Northern Europe
United States *	5.763	2023	Americas	Northern America
U.S. Virgin Islands	49.857	2012	Americas	Latin America and the Caribbean
Uruguay	11.280	2024	Americas	Latin America and the Caribbean
Uzbekistan	1.399	2021	Asia	Central Asia
Vanuatu	0.335	2020	Oceania	Melanesia
Venezuela *	13.812	2023	Americas	Latin America and the Caribbean
Vietnam *	1.535	2011	Asia	South-eastern Asia
Yemen *	5.810	2013	Asia	Western Asia
Zambia *	5.202	2015	Africa	Sub-Saharan Africa
Zimbabwe *	6.758	2022	Africa	Sub-Saharan Africa

== Other multi-country studies ==
A 2024 study by InSight Crime revealed that the Turks and Caicos Islands had the highest homicide rate in Latin America and the Caribbean. Haiti ranked second, followed by St. Kitts and Nevis in third place. In 2025, InSight Crime reported that the overall homicide rate across Latin America and the Caribbean declined. Haiti recorded the highest rate in the region, followed by the Turks and Caicos Islands, Ecuador, Saint Vincent and the Grenadines and Saint Lucia.

== See also ==
- Category:Homicide statistics - Homicide rate tables for countries will show up there first.
- Commons:Category:Homicide statistics - for images.
- Clearance rate
- Crime statistics
- Homicide statistics by gender
- List of cities by murder rate
- List of countries by firearm-related death rate
- List of countries by incarceration rate
- List of countries by intentional death rate – homicide plus suicide.
- List of countries by life expectancy
- List of countries by suicide rate
- List of Brazilian states by murder rate
- List of Brazilian federative units by homicide rate
- List of Canadian provinces and territories by homicide rate
- List of Mexican states by homicides
- List of federal subjects of Russia by murder rate
- List of U.S. states and territories by violent crime rate
- List of U.S. states and territories by intentional homicide rate

== Sources ==
- Global Study on Homicide 2013: Trends, Contexts, Data (PDF). Vienna: United Nations Office on Drugs and Crime. March 2014. ISBN 9789210542050. Look for page numbers on the bottom of pages, and ignore the incorrect page numbers provided by your PDF reader.
