= Capital punishment for drug trafficking =

1,212+ executions in 2025.
Location	Count
Iran	955+
China	unknown #
Saudi Arabia	240
Singapore	15
Kuwait	2
North Korea	assumed
Vietnam	assumed

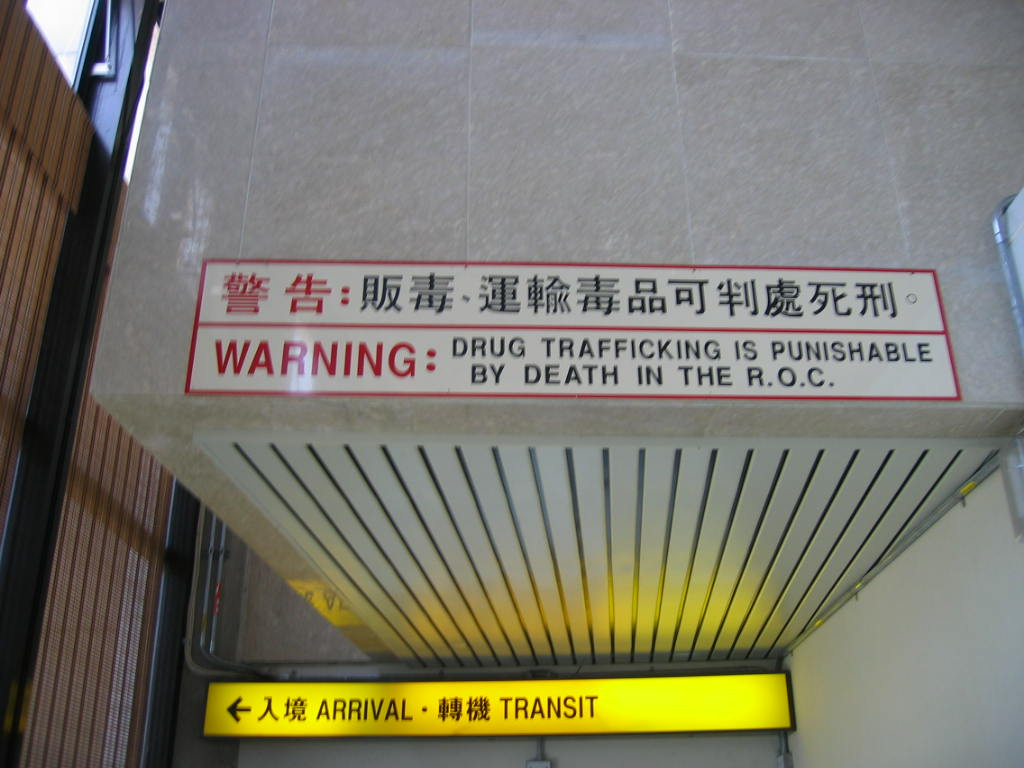
A sign at the Taiwan Taoyuan International Airport warns arriving travelers that drug trafficking is a capital offense in the R.O.C. – the official name of the Republic of China, also known as Taiwan.

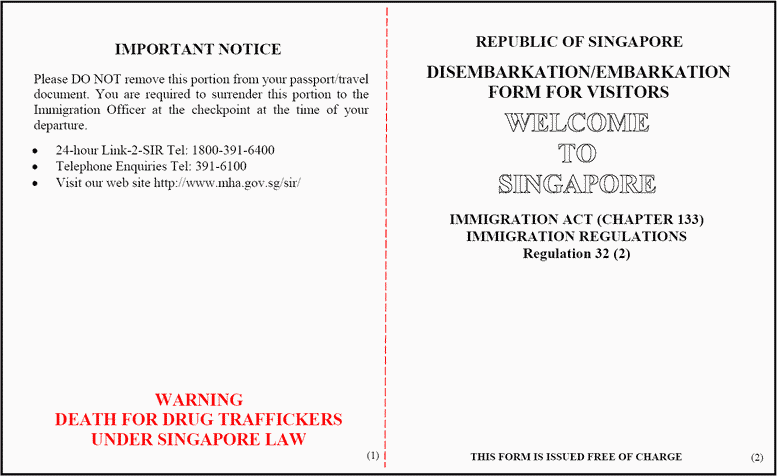
The Singapore embarkation card contains a warning to visitors about the death penalty for drug trafficking under the Misuse of Drugs Act. Warning signs can also be found at the Johor-Singapore Causeway and other border entries.

Being involved in the illegal drug trade in certain countries, which may include illegally importing, exporting, selling or possession of significant amounts of drugs, constitutes a capital offence and may result in capital punishment for drug trafficking, or possession assumed to be for drug trafficking. There are also extrajudicial executions of suspected drug users and traffickers in at least two countries without drug death penalties by law: Mexico and the Philippines.

In 2025: "At least 1,212 people were executed for drug offences worldwide (excluding figures from China, Vietnam and North Korea)." This is according to Harm Reduction International. Executions were confirmed in five countries (China, Iran, Kuwait, Saudi Arabia and Singapore). Executions are assumed to have been carried out in North Korea and Vietnam. Over 46% of all executions confirmed globally were for drug offences. "For the first time in over a decade, two countries – Algeria and the Maldives – introduced the death penalty for drug offences." So 36 countries now have the death penalty for drugs.

As of December 2022 Harm Reduction International (HRI) reports 3700+ people are on death row for drug offences worldwide. For 2022, HRI reports at least 285 executions by law for drug offences globally in 6 countries, 252+ in Iran, 22 in Saudi Arabia, and 11 in Singapore. Exact numbers are not possible due to "extreme opacity" in some countries: China, North Korea, and Vietnam.

A Harm Reduction International global overview of 2022 reported: "HRI has identified 35 countries and territories that retain the death penalty for drug offences in law. Only a small number of these countries carry out executions for drug offences regularly. In fact, six of these states are classified by Amnesty International as abolitionist in practice. This means that they have not carried out executions for any crime in the past ten years (although in some cases death sentences are still pronounced), and 'are believed to have a policy or established practice of not carrying out executions.' Other countries have neither sentenced to death nor executed anyone for a drug offence, despite having dedicated laws in place."

A March 2018 report by Harm Reduction International says: "Between January 2015 and December 2017, at least 1,320 people are known to have been executed for drug-related offences – 718 in 2015; 325 in 2016; and 280 in 2017. These estimates do not include China, as reliable figures continue to be unavailable for the country." 1,176 of the 1,320 total were in Iran.

According to a 2011 article by the Lawyers Collective, an NGO in India, "32 countries impose capital punishment for offences involving narcotic drugs and psychotropic substances." A 2015 article by The Economist says that the laws of 32 countries provide for capital punishment for drug smuggling.

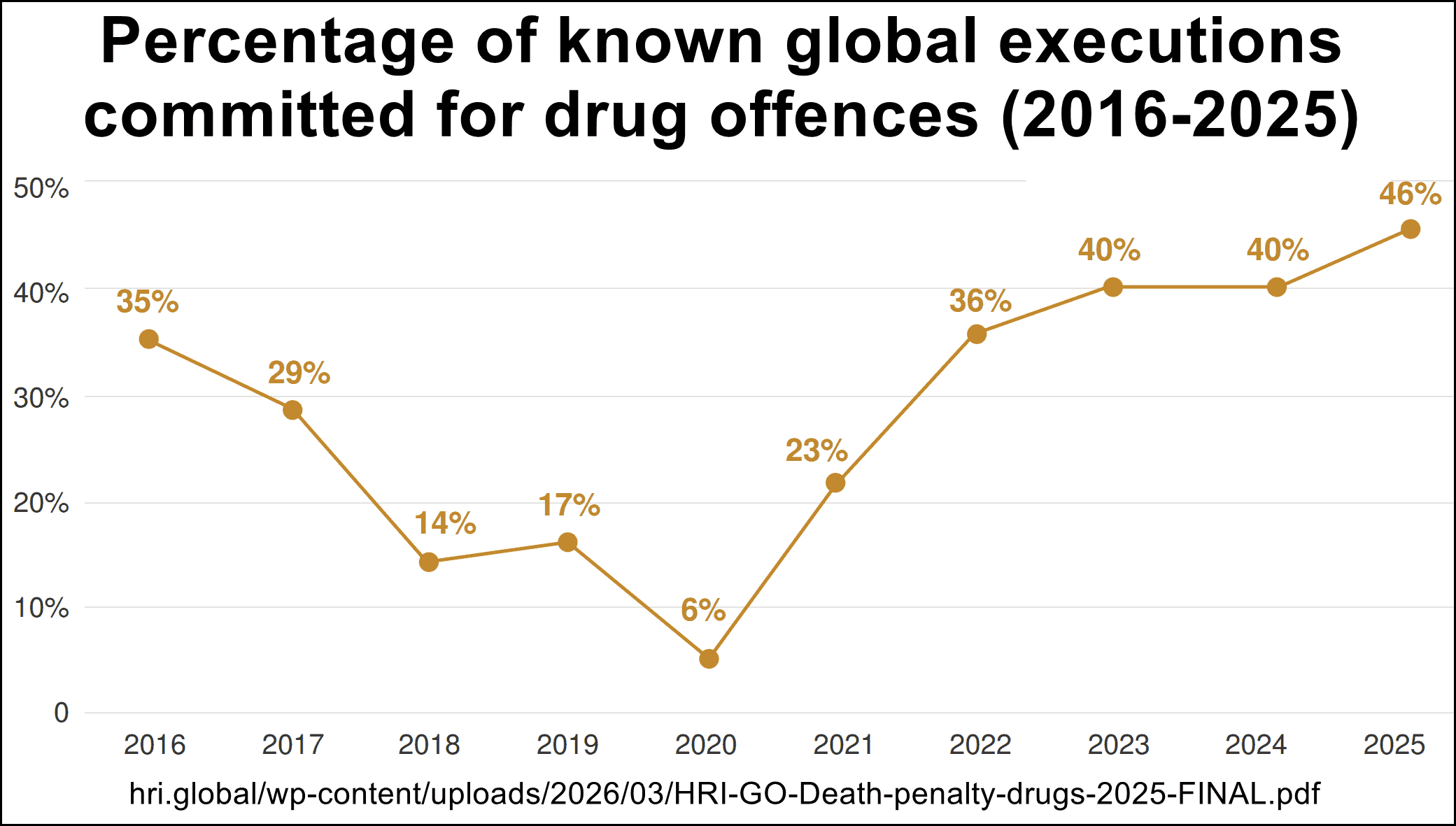
Yearly timeline by Harm Reduction International.

== Overview ==
Sentences for drug-related crimes, especially for trafficking, are the strictest in Asian countries. In January 2014, then-President Thein Sein of Myanmar commuted all the country's death sentences to life imprisonment. In South Korea, the law continues to provide for the death penalty for drug offences, although it currently has a moratorium on capital punishment: there have been no executions since 1997, but there are still people on death row, and new death sentences continue to be handed down. While capital punishment has been abolished in the Philippines, the Philippine drug war led to thousands of extrajudicial executions against drug traffickers, which were endorsed by ex-president Rodrigo Duterte and his government. Killings continue. See Philippine drug war.

== Use by country ==
Harm Reduction International breaks down nations by high application, low application, symbolic application, and insufficient data.

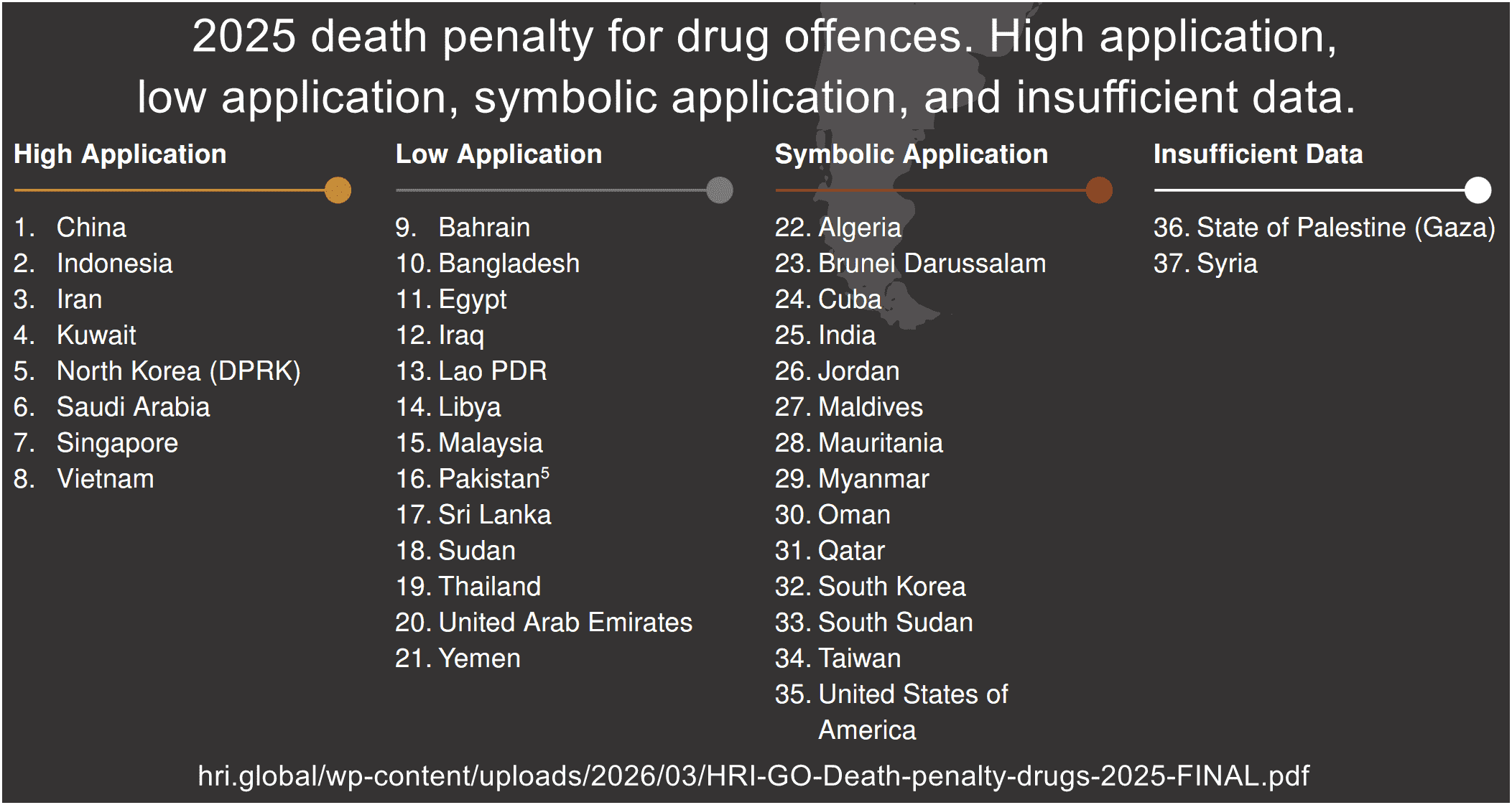
Countries with death penalty for drug offences.

In 2025 HRI says 36 countries still retain the death penalty for drug offences. "Pakistan removed death as a possible sentence for drug offences in 2023. It remains included in this report because people on death row for drug offences were reported in 2025." That is why there are 37 countries listed in the above table from HRI.

Mexico and the Philippines are added to the table below since extrajudicial killings still occurred to drug suspects in 2025. See Mexican drug war and Philippine drug war. So there are 39 countries listed in the table below.

Note: Asterisk (*) after country name below indicates Crime in LOCATION links.

Nations that retain the death penalty for drug offenses by law or extrajudicial execution.
Location	Notes
Algeria	
Bahrain *	
Bangladesh *	
Brunei	
China *	Ranks first in the world by number of executions related to drug trafficking.
Cuba *	
Egypt *	
Gaza Strip	
India *	Option when a second conviction for drug trafficking in quantities specified.
Indonesia *	Death penalty for drug-related crimes depending on severity (drug trafficking, possession of large amounts of drugs, etc.), other drug-related crimes may result in life sentencing or other harsh punishments. See also: Bali Nine.
Iran *	Drug trafficking cases are handled under the jurisdiction of the Islamic Revolutionary Court, a special court system that tries individuals accused of smuggling, blaspheming, or committing acts of treason. In 1988, the country's Guardian Council passed a law allowing courts to impose mandatory death sentences on drug-traffickers found in possession of specified amounts of proscribed narcotics. Iran ranks second in the world for most executions. In 2023, the country executed 853 individuals, with 481 of them convicted of drug-related offenses.
Iraq	
Jordan *	
Kuwait *	
Laos *	
Libya	
Malaysia *	A Moroccan man was sentenced to death by the High Court on May 30, 2013, for trafficking in more than six kilograms of methamphetamine. A man was sentenced to death by hanging on September 3, 2021, for 299 grams of cannabis presumed to be for trafficking.
Maldives *	
Mauritania *	
Mexico *	Extrajudicial executions. See Mexican drug war.
Myanmar *	According to the cartography available on the French version of the website of the International Federation of Human Rights, drugs crimes can still be punished by the death penalty in Myanmar in theory.
North Korea *	
Oman *	
Qatar *	
Pakistan *	
Philippines *	By law the Philippines has no death penalty for anything. But the Philippine drug war that was enacted under president Rodrigo Duterte has led to thousands of extrajudicial executions against suspected drug users and traffickers.
Saudi Arabia *	Saudi Arabia ranks third in the world for the most executions. 43 percent of those executed in 2015 had been convicted of smuggling drugs, ranging from heroin to marijuana. "Since May [2024], Saudi Arabia has executed 28 people on drug-related charges, according to an AFP tally based on official statements, up from just two in all of 2023."
Singapore *	See Misuse of Drugs Act (Singapore).
South Korea *	Drug trafficking can result in a death penalty; however, South Korea has not had an execution for such offenses since 1997.
South Sudan	
Sri Lanka *	
Sudan	
Syria	
Taiwan *	Legal penalty under Narcotics Hazard Prevention Act, though rarely enforced in recent years. Last execution for drug trafficking offense is on October 7, 2002, although there exist those on death row.
Thailand *	
United Arab Emirates *	
United States *	Very large quantities or mixtures (e.g. on an industrial scale) of heroin, cocaine, ecgonine, phencyclidine (PCP), lysergic acid diethylamide (LSD), marijuana, or methamphetamine may result in the death penalty in the United States. So far, no prisoner has been put on death row for this reason. While the United States Supreme Court in Kennedy v. Louisiana (2008) struck down capital punishment for crimes that do not result in the death of a victim, it has left open the possibility for "offenses against the State" – including crimes such as "drug kingpin activity" (also, treason and espionage). From a March 2018 article: "This week, U.S. Attorney General Jeff Sessions sent a memo to the nation’s federal prosecutors urging them to seek the death penalty in cases involving large-scale drug traffickers. The memo points to an existing but little-known federal law that already allows for such a punishment. Sessions’ memo talks largely about opioids, but federal law contains no such drug-specific limitation on prosecutors’ power."
Vietnam *	
Yemen *	Harm Reduction International reports: "imposition of one death sentence for drug use and trafficking of amphetamines and cannabis resin in June 2022. This is the first drug-related death sentence noted by a reputable source in 11 years".

== See also ==
- Capital punishment
- Outline of capital punishment
- Use of capital punishment by country
- Capital punishment for cannabis trafficking
- Maritime drug trafficking in Latin America
- Mexican drug war
- Philippine drug war
- United Nations Office on Drugs and Crime
- United Nations Commission on Narcotic Drugs

Making this discussion somewhat easier is the fact that in a recent case totally unrelated to drug trafficking (the case itself addressed the constitutionality of imposing the death penalty for rape of a child where no death occurs), Kennedy v. Louisiana, the U.S. Supreme Court conducted a detailed analysis of the distinction between crimes that do and do not take a human life and the relationship of each type of crime to the death penalty. Within this analysis, in a non-binding portion of the Court’s opinion (dictum), the Court drew an analytical line separating “offenses against the individual” from “offenses against the State.” In its holding, the Kennedy Court stated that, at least within the category of “offenses against the individual,” the death penalty is unconstitutional for crimes that do not take a human life, because the punishment of death is “excessive” and “disproportionate” to the crime, pursuant to the Eighth Amendment’s prohibition on “cruel and unusual punishment.” With respect to the other category, however – “offenses against the State” – including crimes such as drug trafficking (and treason and espionage), even when they do not result in a death, the Court left open the possibility that the death penalty might not be unconstitutionally “excessive” punishment.
