= List of Canadian provinces and territories by homicide rate =

This is a list of Canadian provinces and territories by homicide rate according to Statistics Canada.

== Homicide rate by province ==
Note: The rate columns can be sorted in ascending or descending order. Sort the province/territory column to return to alphabetical order.

Rates are calculated per 100,000 inhabitants per year and sorted by population (note that homicide rates fluctuate a lot for areas with low population).

Province/territory	1990	2000	2010	2015	2016	2017	2018	2019	2020	2021	2022	2023	2015 –2023
Ontario	1.77	1.35	1.44	1.27	1.48	1.41	1.90	1.74	1.65	1.91	1.93	1.68	1.66
Quebec	2.63	2.00	1.08	0.97	0.81	1.12	1.00	0.92	1.02	1.05	1.28	1.14	1.03
British Columbia	3.34	2.10	1.86	2.01	1.85	2.45	1.83	1.78	1.93	2.39	2.89	2.23	2.15
Alberta	3.20	1.96	2.09	3.21	2.76	2.81	1.93	2.30	3.24	2.69	2.64	2.45	2.67
Manitoba	3.44	2.61	3.69	3.71	3.27	3.52	4.07	5.40	4.49	4.45	6.30	5.09	4.48
Saskatchewan	3.57	2.58	3.23	4.10	5.02	3.31	3.03	4.72	5.48	6.08	6.19	4.88	4.76
Nova Scotia	0.88	1.71	2.34	1.28	1.38	2.21	1.14	0.61	3.74 (Note: The murder rate this year was significantly higher than normal due to the 2020 Nova Scotia attacks)	2.30	1.85	1.32	1.86
New Brunswick	1.49	1.33	1.20	1.45	1.44	1.30	1.69	2.19	1.79	1.39	1.85	1.08	1.58
Newfoundland and Labrador	0	1.14	0.77	0.57	1.51	0.76	0.38	0.95	0.76	1.52	0.56	1.49	0.94
Prince Edward Island	0.77	2.20	0.00	0.69	0.00	1.34	0.00	1.28	0.63	0.62	0.00	0.58	0.72
Northwest Territories	20.4	2.47	2.31	13.56	6.72	4.48	13.47	4.50	13.48	2.24	6.71	13.34	7.32
Yukon	3.60	6.57	2.89	2.65	10.38	20.24	7.43	2.43	0.00	9.31	4.56	8.89	7.32
Nunavut		10.91	17.99	5.48	2.70	15.93	20.88	18.02	7.60	4.99	2.47	4.92	9.22

== Table 2 ==
Intentional homicide rate (per 100,000)

< 1 1–5	5–10 10–21.1	> 20.0

Canada	2004	2005	2006	2007	2008	2009	2010	2011	2012	2013	2014	2015	2016	2017	2018
Newfoundland and Labrador	0.39	2.4	1.37	0.59	0.98	0.20	0.77	0.76	0.57	1.33	0.38	0.57	1.32	0.76	0.38
Prince Edward Island	0.00	0.00	0.73	0.00	1.44	0.00	0.00	0.69	0.00	0.69	2.08	0.69	0.00	1.33	0.00
Nova Scotia	1.49	2.13	1.71	1.39	1.28	1.60	2.34	2.33	1.80	1.38	0.64	1.28	1.38	2.21	1.15
New Brunswick	0.93	1.20	0.94	1.08	0.40	1.60	1.20	1.06	0.79	0.92	1.32	1.45	1.44	1.30	1.69
Quebec	1.47	1.32	1.22	1.17	1.19	1.12	1.07	1.31	1.34	0.86	0.87	0.97	0.81	1.12	0.99
Ontario	1.51	1.75	1.55	1.58	1.36	1.36	1.44	1.21	1.22	1.24	1.15	1.27	1.48	1.40	1.86
Manitoba	4.26	4.16	3.38	5.21	4.51	4.72	3.69	4.38	4.32	4.03	3.52	3.71	3.20	3.52	4.07
Saskatchewan	3.91	4.23	4.23	2.99	3.05	3.48	3.23	3.56	2.68	2.82	2.16	3.93	4.84	3.30	2.93
Alberta	2.65	3.25	2.78	2.53	3.09	2.64	2.06	3.04	2.25	2.03	2.62	3.21	2.76	2.80	1.88
British Columbia	2.72	2.41	2.59	2.05	2.71	2.65	1.86	1.95	1.58	1.60	1.89	2.01	1.85	2.42	1.78
Yukon	22.24	3.13	0.00	6.14	9.07	5.93	2.89	0.00	0.00	0.00	8.08	2.65	10.38	20.19	7.41
Northwest Territories	9.24	0.00	0.00	4.61	6.92	4.64	2.31	6.90	11.46	4.57	6.84	13.56	6.72	4.45	13.47
Nunavut	13.40	6.59	6.49	22.30	12.54	18.40	17.99	20.47	14.42	11.32	11.12	5.48	2.70	15.98	20.84

== See also ==
- List of countries by intentional homicide rate
- List of cities by homicide rate
- Crime in Canada
- List of United States cities by crime rate. Cities with population of 250,000+
- List of countries by firearm-related death rate
- Homicide in world cities
