= Law enforcement in Suriname =

There are three major law enforcement/security entities in Suriname.

== Organisations ==
=== Korps Politie Suriname ===
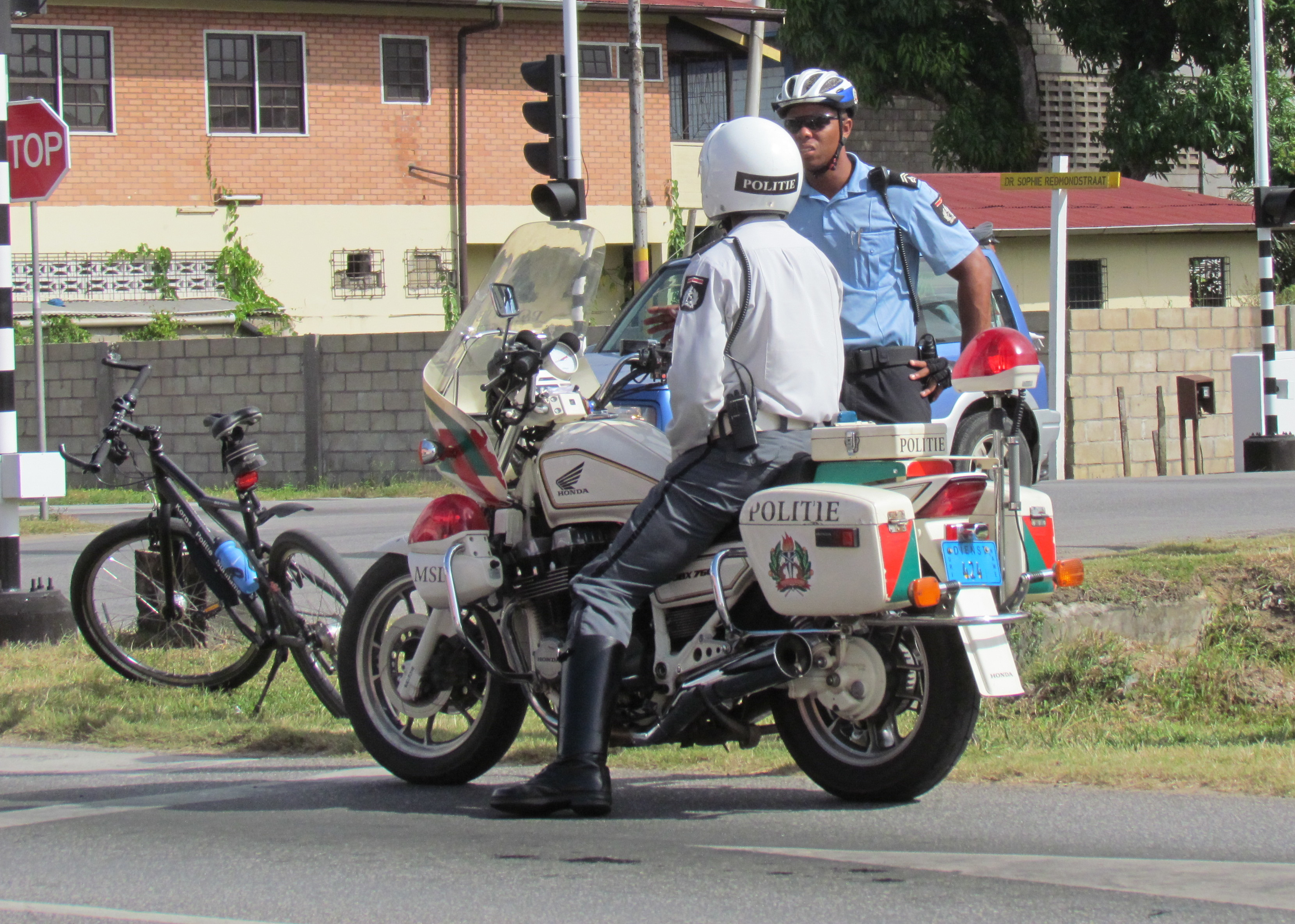
KPS officers

The largest force and the most published in the media is the Korps Politie Suriname (KPS), the national police force of the Republic of Suriname. This is a traditional police department model and is responsible for all the policing efforts. Under the main umbrella of the KPS, there are three branches.

- The city police handle all issues inside the city limits of Paramaribo.
- The rural police handle everything outside of Paramaribo.
- The Judicial Police are composed of specialised police units, such as forensics, fraud, homicide, etc.

=== Military police ===
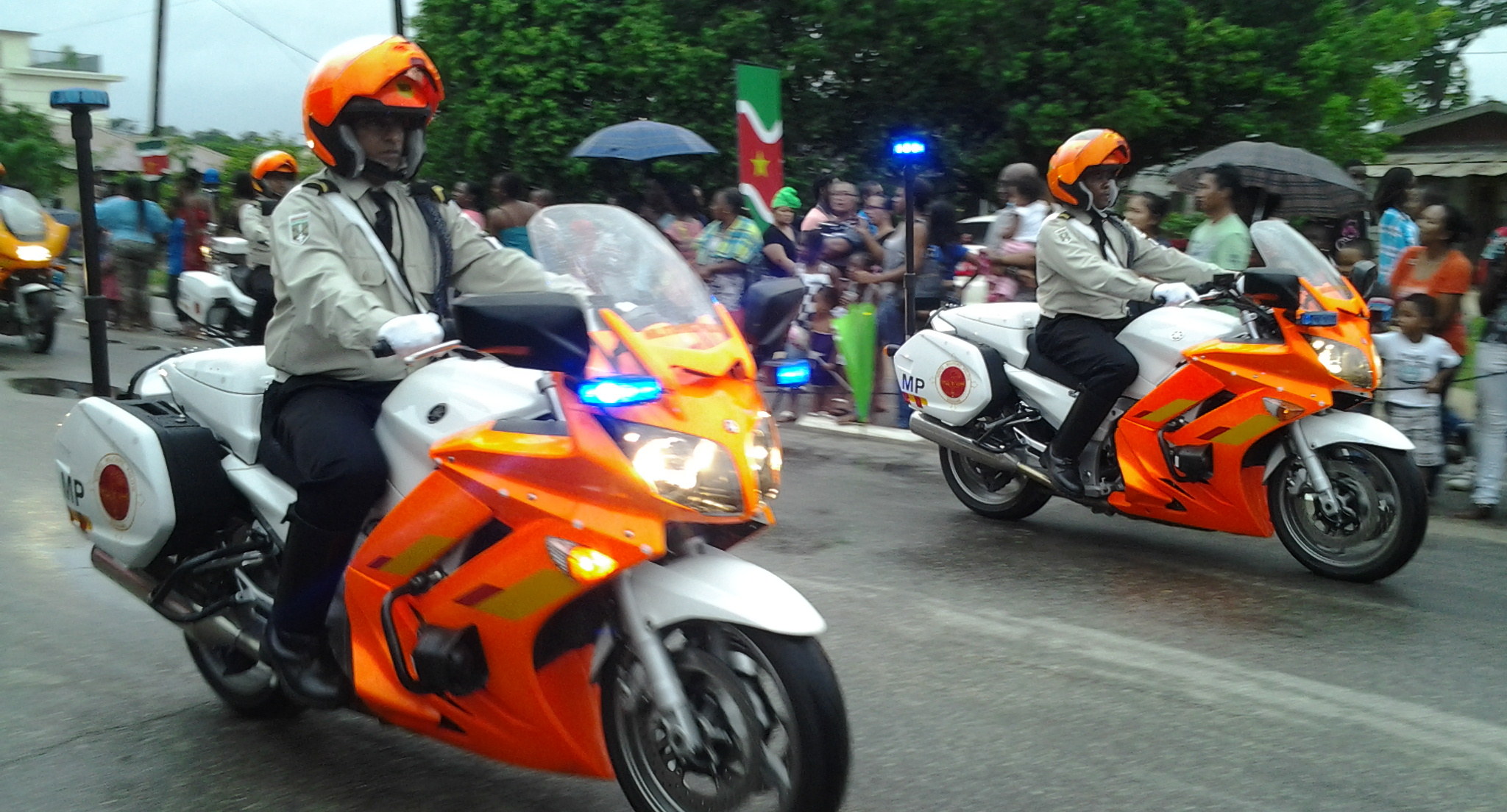
Military Police officers

The second largest military police polices all members of the Surinamese Military and handles border control/immigration functions.

=== Directorate of National Security ===
The third largest law enforcement/security entity are the Surinamese Directorate of National Security. The Directorate is responsible for the Central Intelligence and Security Service (CIVD) and the presidential personal security unit.

=== Bijstands- en Beveiligingsdienst Suriname ===
The Bijstands- en Beveiligingsdienst Suriname (BBS) is the assistance and security service of Suriname.

In general, the Security Service is responsible for:

- the protection of persons and property located in government buildings, public locations and markets;
- the security of government buildings;
- effective and alert fire prevention;
- the security and assistance of the various disbursements to be made by the government agencies in the city and district.
- The Minister may entrust the Security Service with the security of specially designated persons and objects.

== Human rights ==
LGBT individuals have made claims of police mistreatment in Paramaribo. A 2012 UN report stated that Suriname's police scored the lowest in the region in communicating respectably with citizens.

== See also ==
- Crime in Suriname
- Law enforcement in the Netherlands
