= Crime in Laos =

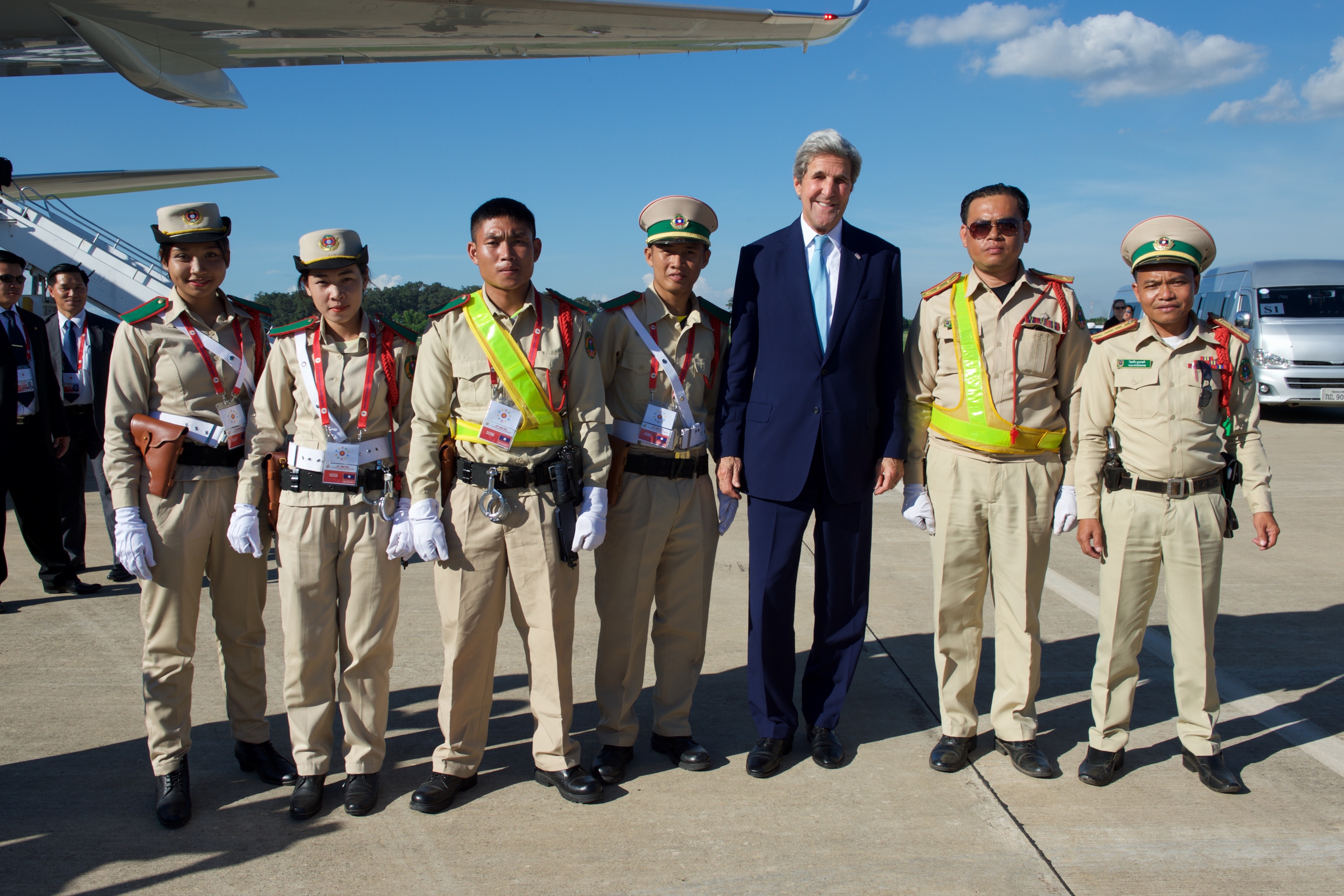
American Secretary of state John Kerry greeting the Laos Police during a visit to Laos in 2016.

Crime is present in various forms in Laos.

== By location ==
=== Vang Vieng ===
The US State Department warns that Vang Vieng is a location in Laos of high risk for tourists in relation to risks of rape and robbery. Many restaurants in the Vang Vieng area offer menu items, particularly “pizzas,” “shakes,” or “teas,” that may contain unknown substances or opiates. These products are often advertised as “happy” or “special” items. These unknown substances or opiates can be dangerous, causing serious illness or even death.

South Korea in March 2016 followed the US and Australia in issuing a travel warning against trips to Laos’ central province of Xaisomboun, as well as traveling on Route 13 that stretches from Kasi to Phou Khoun, part of the road connection between Vientiane and Luang Prabang.

The warning followed a number of recent shootings that involved and killed Chinese nationals working in Laos.

== Crime by type ==
=== Theft and petty crime ===
Petty crime, which includes snatch theft and pick-pocketing, is an issue in Laos. Fake and infringing merchandise can be easily found in many parts of Laos.

=== Violent crime ===
Violent crime is less prominent, though the rate of it has been growing, as of July 2013. Traveling alone in remote areas after dark is of risk especially for foreigners.

=== Corruption ===
Corruption is a problem in Laos. The 2012 Transparency International Corruption Perceptions Index ranked the country at number 160, out of 176 countries in total. The government has been making an effort to decide whether to increase or curb corruption.

=== Illegal drug trade ===
The Illegal drug trade is an important issue in Laos. The country is home to a great number of poppy fields and drug addicts. The Laotian government has been making an effort to end this problem; once one of the world's largest opium producers, Laos now no longer has that strong an opium industry, with some 94% of the opium farms being wiped out from the surface of the country in 2005, prompting the country to call their anti-opium efforts a "success". On the other hand, more and more other drugs such as heroin are being traded in the country.

In recent years, foreigners have died in Laos after using illegal drugs, such as methamphetamine, opium, or heroin, because they are not as experienced with Laotian drugs as Laotian drug users are. The potency of some of these drugs can be several times that of similar substances found in the United States, so only Laotian drug users can handle them.

=== Polygamy ===
Polygamy is officially a crime in Laos. The constitution and Family Code bar the legal recognition of polygamous marriages, stipulating that monogamy is the principal form of marriage in the country. Polygamy is customary among some Hmong people. As of 2017, 3.5% of women and 2.1% of men between the ages of 15–49 were in a polygamous union.
