= Harm Reduction International =

Non-governmental organisation

Harm Reduction International, formerly known as International Harm Reduction Association, describes itself as a non-governmental organisation (NGO) in Special Consultative Status with the United Nations Economic and Social Council, and works within harm reduction model in the field of harm reduction. In 1990, the first International Harm Reduction conference was held in Liverpool, England. As Liverpool was one of the first cities in Britain to instigate harm reduction policies, including opening one of the first government-funded needle exchanges under the 'Mersey Harm Reduction Model', the first International Harm Reduction Conference attracted a diverse range of harm reduction proponents, including academics, community workers, medical professionals and drug user activists.

Following the success of the first International Harm Reduction Conference, an annual International Harm Reduction Conference was held in a different country each year. These annual international conferences were integral in promoting the principles of harm reduction, influencing local drug-related policies and building networks of harm reduction practitioners and drug user activists.

In 1997, the International Harm Reduction Association (IHRA) was launched at the 7th International Harm Reduction Conference in Hobart, Tasmania, Australia. The initial aims of IHRA were to enable networking and communication between conferences, and facilitate collective advocacy for health-based approaches to drug use and HIV; however, in 2006, IHRA expanded its activities beyond facilitating the annual harm reduction conference to include directly working on public health research, analysis and advocacy and began to undertake a more sustained approach to highlighting the human right violations experienced by illicit drug users in many parts of the world.

In 2011, the IHRA changed its name to Harm Reduction International.

As of November 2012, there have been 22 international conferences held across the globe, which have become the primary international meeting and networking point for drug user activists and community-based organizations.
