= Crime in Suriname =

- Homicide: 4.3 (2024)
- Assault: 137.7 (2023)
- Burglary: 467.8 (2022)
- Theft: 479.6 (2022)
- Rape: 49.9 (2023)
- Sexual violence: 113.7 (2023)
- reported per 100,000 inhabitants

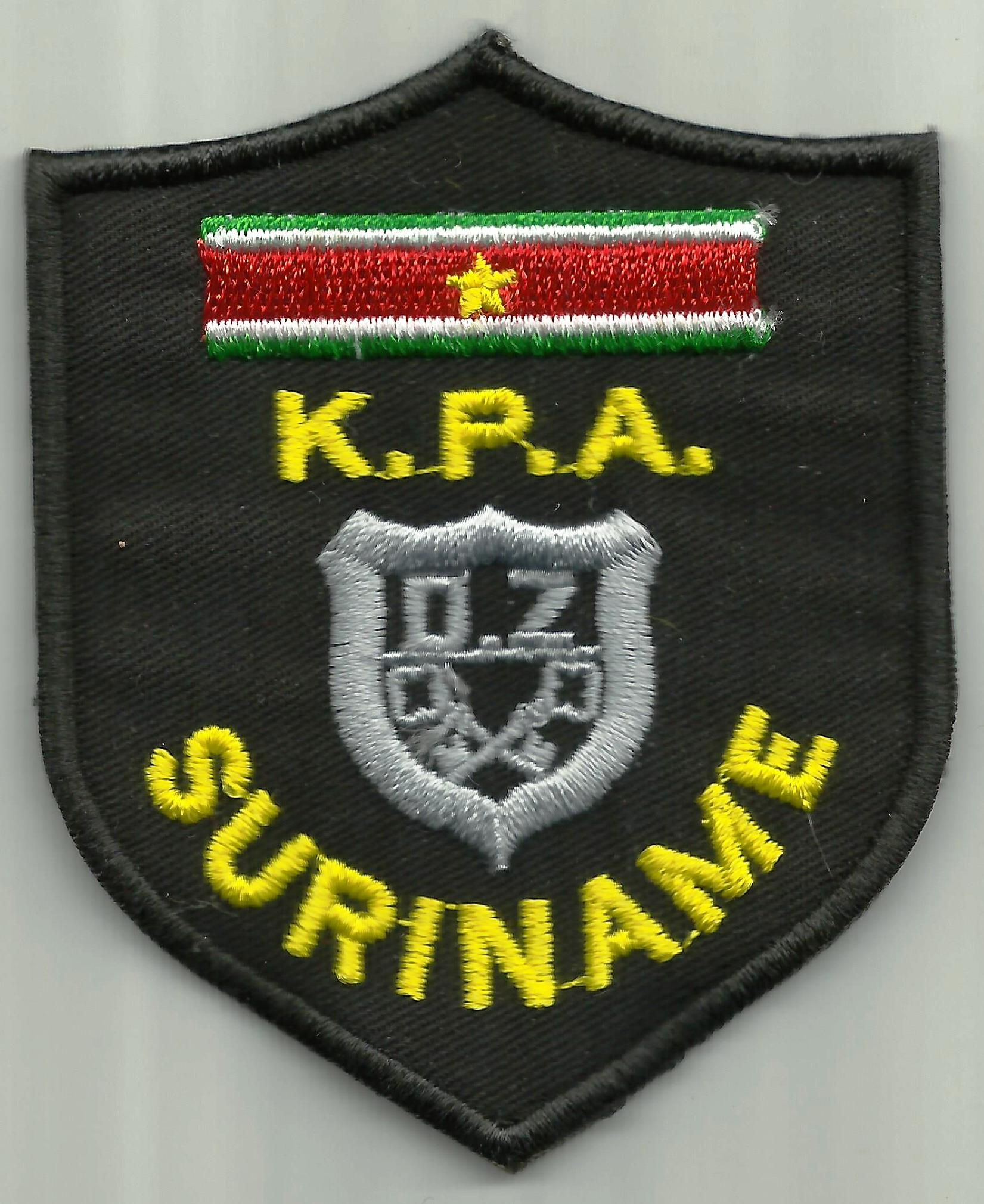
Police patch of the Suriname police.

This article discusses crime in Suriname.

== Crime by type ==
=== Murder ===
In 2012, Suriname had a murder rate of 6.1 per 100,000 population. There were a total of 33 murders in Suriname in 2012.

=== Illegal drug trade ===
Suriname is a transit zone for South American cocaine en route to Europe, Africa and to a lesser extent the U.S. Inadequate resources, limited law enforcement training, the absence of a law enforcement presence in the interior, and lack of aircraft or sufficient numbers of patrol boats limit the capacity of the government to control its borders.

There have been sporadic instances of drug trade-related violence between individuals associated with competing drug trafficking organizations. These have included assassinations, drive-by shootings, and hand grenades tossed over residential walls.

=== Robbery ===
Robbery, including thefts of backpacks and purses, pickpocketing, theft of jewelry (especially necklaces), and cell phones are regular occurrences. These incidents often occur in those areas frequented by foreigners. Tourist areas are common targets for thieves and muggers who often rob victims of their possessions during the hours of darkness. Residential burglaries are an issue.

There have been reports of tourists and foreigners being robbed while traveling in the countryside, and occasional reports of bandits on rural roads. There have been reports of attacks against fishing boats in and around the waters of Suriname.

== By location ==
=== Paramaribo ===
While some areas of Paramaribo are safer than others, there are no areas that can be considered completely safe. Criminals move without restriction into and out of neighborhoods where immigrants live, often utilizing scooters or motorcycles to evade police. The Paramaribo Central area and the Palmentuin (Palm Garden) area are known to be less than safe after dark. Pick pocketing and robbery are increasingly common in the major business and shopping districts in Paramaribo.

There were a dozen murders of homeless men in Paramaribo between 2006 and 2014, with some of the killings appearing to be ritualistic.

== Crime dynamics ==
Criminals often carry firearms and other weapons and do not hesitate to use them, especially if victims resist. Although the possession of handguns is illegal, many criminals possess them.

== See also ==
- Law enforcement in Suriname
