= Crime in Ethiopia =

Crime in Ethiopia includes various techniques ranging from petty theft to homicide. Motivations of crime include high unemployment rate, lack of basic needs of life, housing and education. Rapid population growth also contributed to increase the criminal rate in Ethiopia. In Addis Ababa, crimes include robbery, pickpocketing, scamming and burglary among others are common, although the lowest rate compared to other African cities and within the country.

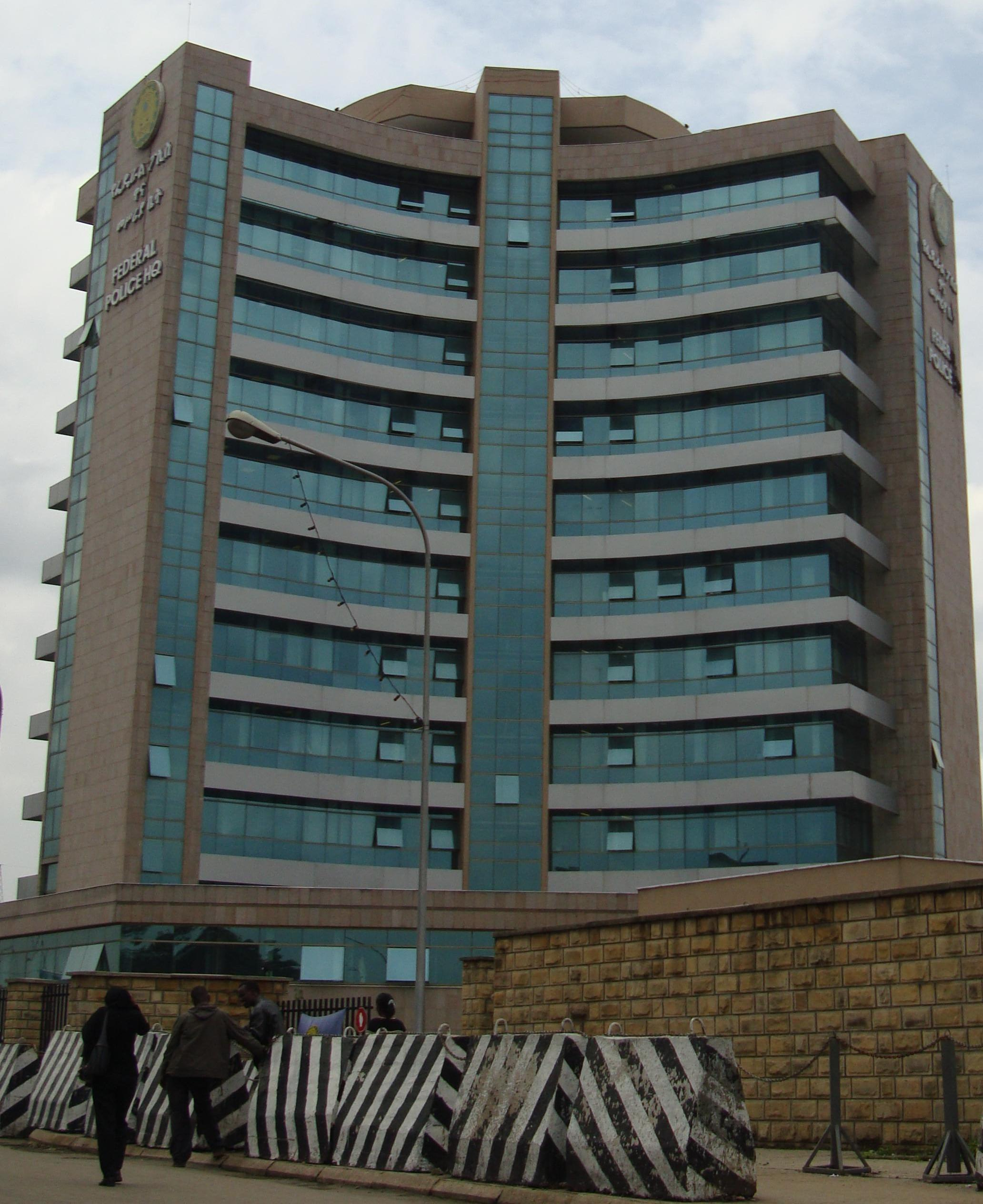
Headquarter of the Ethiopian Federal Police in Addis Ababa

Crime against humanity has recently surging often accompanied by armed conflict in the country. Amnesty International and Human Rights Watch reported in April 2022 that there was systematic crime against humanity perpetuated against Tigrayans during the Tigray War.

== Overview ==
Crime patterns had been radically changed in Ethiopia due to social and political contributions. Prior to 1974 revolution, the feudal and monarchical system of the Ethiopian Empire, there were poor management in the surveillance of crime. Police statistics indicated that crime increased up to 1973–1974, hence they gradually began to decline. After the military dictatorship of the Derg, there was unreliable, wavering data that made the crime rate decreased influenced by mass curfews in the era. This has been resolved after the Derg regime. However, embezzlement, misuse of public funds and other property crime have increased during post-revolutionary period.

In most cities, street violence is common, but the crime rate is lower than in Addis Ababa compared to other African cities. A sample survey conducted in 1996 by research team consisted of federal police and found that 51,869 crimes in 1986 were reported to police commission that year.

In one survey of the Oromia Region, total number of criminals reported to the police was 96.300, male and female offenders 85,100 (88.37%) and 11,200 (11.63%) respectively. This, female offenders share 1/10 of all criminals in Oromia. The ratio of male offenders was 7:6:1. Comparing to Addis Ababa (6.01–7.02), the crime ratio of Oromia is larger.

== Causes ==
Many socio-economic factors are contributing to criminal activity in Ethiopia. For instance, individuals suffering from lack of basic needs of life, such as food, health care, housing and education. Rapid population growth also the greatest factor that leads to face crime presence in the country.

== In Addis Ababa ==
Unlike most African countries, the capital Addis Ababa is safer place in comparison. However, there are numerous reports of minor crimes such as robbery, pickpocketing, scamming and theft related matters. Robbery is increasing especially at night and also in public sites. Others such as sexual harassment and petty theft are more becoming visible in some occasions.

== Torture and crime against humanity ==
Starting from the Derg regime, crime against humanity has been common in the Red Terror spanning from 1975 to 1988, from what referred as "law of the jungle". By 1977, the Derg persecuted civilians who opposed the military rule; according to eyewitnesses, over 1,000 young people has been executed by 16 May. There bodies were left in the street and ravaged by hyenas at night.

In June 2018, Prime Minister Abiy Ahmed told that there was mass torture and crime against humanity in post-1991 regime of EPRDF perpetrated by police detention centers, dungeons and prisons across the country. In 2021, the Ethiopian Human Rights Commission (EHRC) concluded that there was crime against humanity in violence erupted following the killing of musician Hachalu Hundessa in June 2020. During the Tigray War, the EHRC together with the United Nations Joint Investigation Team (JIT) found in March 2022 that all parties during the conflict perpetrated crime against humanity.

In April 2022, Amnesty International and Human Rights Watch reported that the Amhara regional security forces and civilian authorities in Ethiopia's Western Tigray Zone have committed widespread abuses against Tigrayans since November 2020. The document showed that the Ethiopian Federal Police systematically expelled several hundred thousand Tigrayan civilians from their homes using threats, unlawful killings, sexual violence, mass arbitrary detention, pillage, forcible transfer and blockage of humanitarian assistance.

== Corruption ==
Corruption exists in various forms including but not limited to clientelism, kleptocracy, rent seeking and state capture. Anti-corruption laws also enacted in practice, but not sufficiently effective to control the prevalence.

Indicator	2016 percentile rank	2017 percentile rank
Control of corruption	39.9	33.2
Government effectiveness	28.8	23.6
Political stability and absence of violence/terrorism	7.6	7.6
Regulatory quality	11.5	13.9
Rule of law	33.7	33.7
Voice and accountability	9.4	9.9

== Types of crime by score ==
Type	Score
Criminal market	4.95
Human trafficking	6.00
Human smuggling	6.50
Arms trafficking	7.00
Flora crimes	3.50
Fauna crimes	5.50
Non-renewable resource crimes	5.50
Heroin trade	3.00
