= Crime in Zimbabwe =

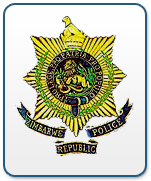
Zimbabwe Police badge.

Crime in Zimbabwe, falls under the purview of the Ministry of Home Affairs who oversee the Zimbabwe Republic Police and the Ministry of Justice. The majority of crimes are non-violent, common crimes include robbery and "smash and grab" break ins.

== Non-political crime ==
Although the majority of crimes in Zimbabwe are non-violent, perpetrators are generally armed with weapons, which can include firearms. The downtown sector of Harare and its high density residential suburbs are particularly high-crime areas. A number of American visitors have been assaulted or robbed while walking in the town of Victoria Falls, especially after dark.

Purse-snatchers will often work in teams of two, with one person acting as a diversion. A typical mugging involves a group of young males who surround and overwhelm their victim in a public area. Cell phones are of particular interest to local thieves.

A popular crime committed in Zimbabwe is the "smash and grab," in which thieves break the windows of cars stopped at intersections and take items from inside the car. Zimbabwean criminals also use ploys to lure drivers out of their cars. In one ploy, an assailant will slash a tire and then offer to help with the flat, particularly on the road to Harare International Airport.

== Political crime ==
The forcible removal of 700,000 people from slums in Zimbabwe in 2005 was called "a crime against humanity" by the United Nations and several other agencies. Zimbabwe's government created Operation Murambatsvina as an urban clean-up campaign to remove illegal structures, though it was criticised for its demolitions of shops and homes. Human rights groups proposed taking Zimbabwe to the International Criminal Court in The Hague.

In the Corruption Perceptions Index 2007, Zimbabwe was ranked 150th out of 179 countries for corruption (least corrupt countries are at the top of the list). On a scale of 0 to 10, with 0 the most corrupt and 10 the most transparent, Transparency International rated Zimbabwe 2.1.

== Law enforcement ==
The Zimbabwe Republic Police's (ZRP) law enforcement capabilities have deteriorated in recent years. Due to Zimbabwe's economic struggles, the police lack sufficient funding to maintain and operate equipment and/or train and equip personnel. It is hard for the police to respond to emergencies. In the case of criminal activity, the police usually need to be provided transportation to perform any investigative function, and criminal incidents must be reported in person to the nearest police station. They tend to be apathetic towards investigating crime, and focus their resources on political acts, especially demonstrations.

However, in 2007 Zimbabwe's crime rate for illegal border crossing, smuggling, stock theft, poaching and illegal mining had declined by 64 percent, 54 percent, 32 percent, 31 percent, and 5 percent respectively. Innocent Matibiri, Police Deputy Commissioner in Charge of Operations, credited the lowering of this figure to the Support Unit for recovering various firearms, which had been used in armed robberies, murder crimes and lethal weapons.
