= Crime in Bahrain =

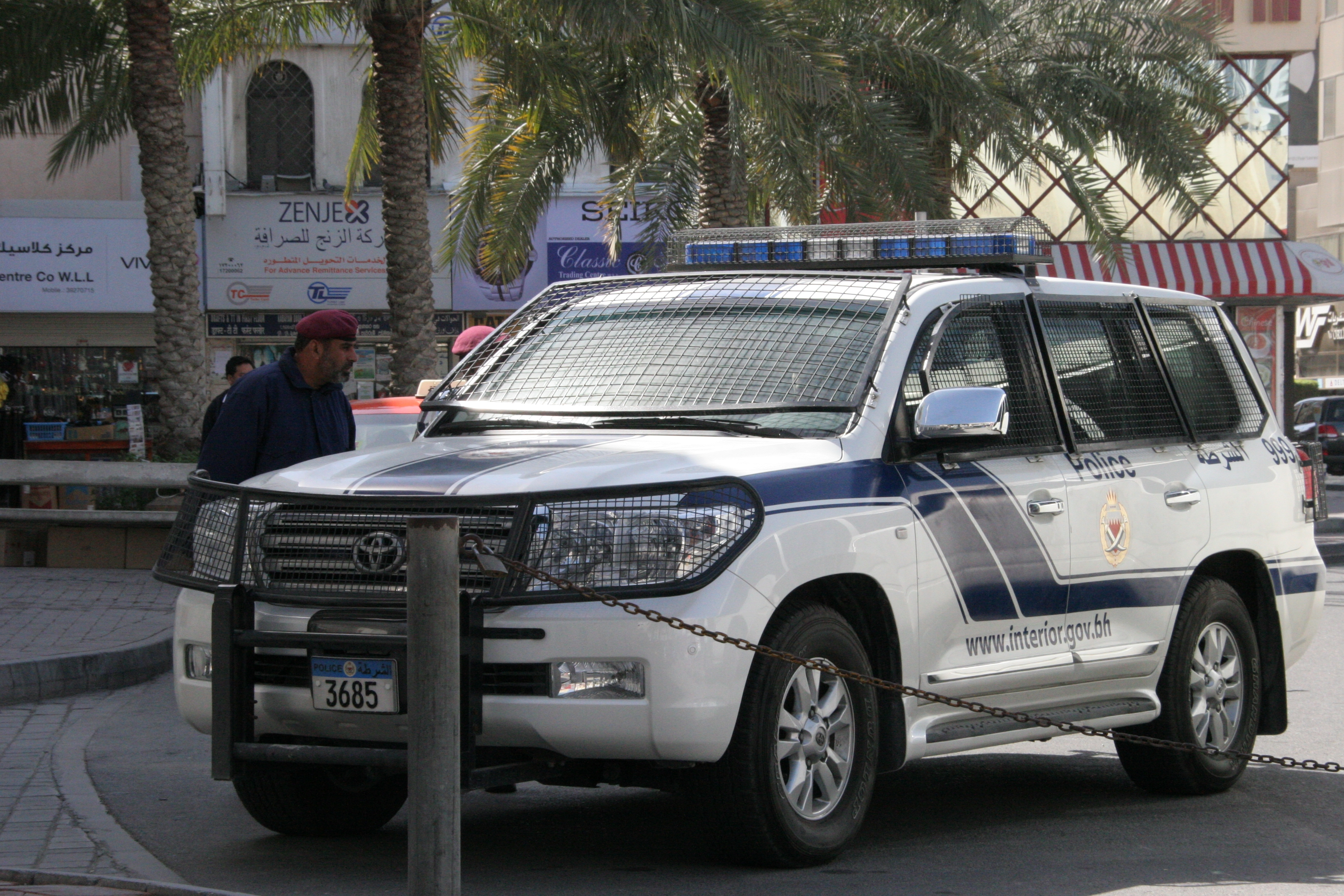
Bahraini police

There is a low rate of crime in Bahrain. Incidents of petty crime such as pickpocketing and bag snatching are reported especially in the old market areas (souks). Incidents of violent crime are uncommon, but increasing. Though small in size, there is a growing underground drug market in the country. According to Emile Nakhleh, approximately 65% of violent crime and theft are committed by foreign citizens residing in Bahrain.

== Human trafficking ==
Bahrain is a destination country for men and women trafficked for the purposes of involuntary servitude and commercial sexual exploitation. Men and women from Africa, South Asia and Southeast Asia migrate voluntarily to Bahrain to work as laborers or domestic servants where some face conditions of involuntary servitude such as unlawful withholding of passports, restrictions on movements, non-payment of wages, threats and physical or sexual abuse. Women from Eastern Europe, Central Asia, Southeast Asian country like Thailand and North African nation like Morocco are trafficked to Bahrain for the purpose of commercial sexual exploitation.

== Terrorism ==
Threat of terrorist attack is low in the country, but it is still a matter of concern. The Department of Foreign Affairs and Trade (DFAT) of the Government of Australia advised travelers "to exercise a high degree of caution in Bahrain" due to high threat of terrorism. According to the DFAT, terrorists can target shopping areas, supermarkets, embassies, hotels, restaurants, clubs, cinemas and theaters, schools, places of worship, outdoor recreation events and tourist areas.

== Corruption ==
In the Corruption Perceptions Index 2007, Bahrain was ranked 46th out of 179 countries for corruption (least corrupt countries are at the top of the list). On a scale of 0 to 10 with 0 the most corrupt and 10 the most transparent, Transparency International rated Bahrain 5.0.
