= Crime in Papua New Guinea =

Papua New Guinea
- Crime rates* (324324)

Violent crimes
- Homicide: 9.0 (2008)
- Rape: 1
- Robbery: 63 (2000)
- Aggravated assault: 25.1 (2011)

Property crimes
- Burglary: 48.6 (2000)
- Note: Reported crimes per 100,000 population Source: Crime recorded by police in Papua New Guinea

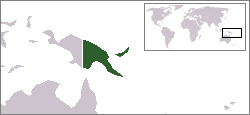
Location of Papua New Guinea

The crime rate of Papua New Guinea is one of the highest in the world.

Crime throughout the country, particularly violent crime, has been influenced mainly by rapid social, political and economic changes. An increased rate of unemployment has resulted in social and economic crisis causing poverty in rural areas, while a sequential shift towards urban areas has created cultural friction. This has become a long-term concern hindering the growth of the economy. According to the Economist Intelligence Unit's liveability index, Papua New Guinea ranks 136th out of 140 countries as of 2017, indicating its place as one of the most crime-ridden and impoverished countries on earth.

The centralised geographical location of Papua New Guinea has also seen the rise of non-violent, organised crime; specifically, corruption contributing substantially to increased crime statistics within the major cities of Port Moresby, Mount Hagen, Lae and Goroka. The geographically appealing qualities of Papua New Guinea and its surrounding islands also promote illegal drug and human trafficking as critical issues.

Crime prevention and law enforcement services in Papua New Guinea lie primarily in the hands of the Royal Papua New Guinea Constabulary (RPNGC); however, local police services are typically unreliable. The RPNGC is a government organisation led by the Police Commissioner and is responsible for the national police force, thus, holds power throughout the country. However, strategies to combat crime are largely influenced by the corruption of state officials.

== Violent crime ==
Papua New Guinea is notorious for its high crime rates. The major cities of Port Moresby, Mount Hagen and Lae, in particular, have become hotspots for many forms of violent, criminal behaviour including theft, carjacking, breaking and entering, domestic violence, sexual assault, and murder.

Raskol gangs are gangs known in Papua New Guinea to engage in all small- and large-scale criminal activity. These organisations surfaced in PNG's capital city of Port Moresby in the 1970s, and have since then spread considerably throughout the country and dominating most areas. Raskol gangs originated from the movement of migrants from rural to urban areas which consequently established poor living standards. More recently, however, these groups consist primarily of those faced with limited or informal educational and employment opportunities. Crimes committed by younger members, particularly those under the age of 18 have been heavily attributed to unrestricted access to drugs and alcohol.

Animosity between local tribes and clans is also responsible for the presence of crime occurring as a result of civil unrest. Port Moresby and Lae, as well as the Southern Highlands Province, are common areas in Papua New Guinea for tensions between ethnic groups. It is also advised that visitors, and locals alike, avoid public protests and demonstrations as violence can break out unexpectedly between security forces and civilians. Previously, these public displays of action and large crowds have resulted in the destruction of property and police forces have been unable to intervene.

=== Sexual violence ===
Papua New Guinea is often described as one of the worst places in the world for gender-based violence and sexual violence, with rates considered epidemic by some organizations. Nearly 60% of women and girls (aged 15–49) in Papua New Guinea have experienced some form of physical sexual violence in their lifetime.

A 2013 study by Rachel Jewkes and colleagues, on behalf of the United Nations Multi-country Cross-sectional Study on Men and Violence research team, found that 41% of men on Bougainville Island admit to coercing a non-partner into sex, and 59% admit to having sex with their partner when she was unwilling. According to this study, about 14.1% of men have committed multiple perpetrator rape. In a survey in 1994 by the PNG Institute of Medical Research, approximately 60% of men interviewed reported to have participated in gang rape (known as lainap) at least once.

=== Human trafficking ===
The illegal trade of humans occurs extensively throughout Papua New Guinea, specifically in Port Moresby. Men, women and children are involved in sexual exploitation, forced prostitution, forced labour and domestic servitude as the most common forms. A 2018 study undertaken by the United Nations High Commissioner for Refugees (UNHCR) concluded that approximately 30% of sex trafficking victims in Papua New Guinea were under the age of 18.

Due to the convenient location and relaxed legal structure of PNG, the country acts as an international and domestic source and terminal for human trafficking. Authorities in PNG have addressed the issue, however, significant measures have not yet been taken to prevent trafficking and exploitation of individuals. Though there are international minimum standards for the elimination of human trafficking, PNG's laws are not adequately restrictive and there has been no significant action taken against perpetrators.

Corruption of government officials has aggravated the issue by their acceptance of bribes such as the provision of female trafficking victims in return for political favours. A lack of financial resources and personnel dedicated to resolving the complication has also contributed to low conviction rates, as well as a lack of identification and protection procedures.

International Law Enforcement Advisor and Specialist Steve Harvey explained that reflective of the rest of the world, human trafficking in PNG is linked to “traditional social and cultural norms and practices”. Harvey also highlighted the importance of awareness of the topic and suggested ongoing education and training to increase knowledge of the public and the government.

== Non-violent crime ==
Organised crime is widespread throughout Papua New Guinea. Raskol gangs are not only involved in violence but play a significant role in non-violent or organised crime. Papua New Guinea acts as a large domestic market for high-quality marijuana, as well as an international thoroughfare for numerous other illicit drugs.

The central location of Papua New Guinea in the Pacific serves as a common ground between Indonesia and Australia. Although drug trafficking in this sense is not directly regarding violence, it is often a catalyst of feuds between cultural groups. While drug trafficking is considered the foundation of organised crime, money laundering and cybercrime still occur.

=== Corruption ===
Corruption, referring to the criminal wrongdoing of individuals in a position of power for personal gain, is prevalent throughout Papua New Guinea. The actions of officials are often unregulated due to an unstable political system. According to a 2018 Corruption Perception Index (CPI) undertaken by Transparency International, PNG scored 28 out of 100, classifying the country as "highly corrupt".

Following PNG's ongoing affairs surrounding corruption, the National Anti-Corruption Authority (NACA) was established in April 2004, in an attempt to reduce negative implications. NACA works alongside nine other public sector organisations, including the Royal Papua New Guinea Constabulary (RPNGC) with the common goal of reducing corruption throughout the country.

=== Drug trafficking ===
Approximately 150 km wide, the Torres Strait connects Australia and Papua New Guinea, acting as an international sea lane and transit point for smuggling drugs such as methamphetamine and cocaine. Historically, the location of Papua New Guinea and its surrounding abundance of small, remote islands has attracted drug traffickers. PNG commonly acts as an intermediary for traffickers making their way from countries including South Africa and Latin America to Australia.

Large amounts of small boat traffic in waters surrounding islands within the Torres Strait make it easier for drug trafficking boats to go unnoticed. Drug traffickers also exploit Papua New Guinea's weak border security while communication between drug traffickers and corrupt government officials promotes illegal activity. Papua New Guinea's security services supplied by the police and defence force are unable to monitor the full extent of the country's coastline due to a lack of necessary resources. Despite a lack of maritime security surrounding PNG, the Australian Federal Police have stepped up and seized approximately 7.5 tonnes of cocaine since 2014. Illegal substances intended for sale in Australia are normally transported through waters surrounding PNG hidden in small vessels as to evade border security.

=== Unemployment ===
High unemployment rates, in combination with a lack of resources, infrastructure and government funding, are a significant contributor to poverty in Papua New Guinea. A consequent lack of employment opportunities and affordable housing is largely responsible for driving individuals towards participation within Papua New Guinea's informal economy.

As a partial result of growth within the informal economy, more than half of inhabitants in PNG's capital city of Port Moresby are living in squatter settlements. Violence and conflicts between government officials and traditional owners concerning legal rights have obstructed the government's attempts to create proper housing in many cases.

A main contributor to the rising unemployment levels in PNG can be attributed to a lack of educational opportunities which has created a low literacy rate of 63.4%. The Tuition Fee Free (TFF) Policy was launched in 2012 in an attempt to attract younger citizens and decrease the financial burden placed on families. Success of the program has fluctuated throughout provinces and it is apparent that further reforms are needed in order to reach western standards.

Over time, urban unemployment rates have also grown in response to economic and social shifts in PNG. The magnitude of unemployment has become apparent, however, despite recent efforts, the government still lacks the resources needed to transform informal urban dwellings.

== Crime prevention ==
The prevention of crime and criminal activity in Papua New Guinea relies heavily on governmental regulatory bodies and the actions of law enforcement officials. However, corruption hinders the efforts of such in the prevention of crime.

Due to the occurrence of criminal activity within major cities such as Port Moresby, the government has intensified security measures, both privately and publicly, to prevent violent crime. Additional security resources in prime areas aim to decrease the impacts of lawlessness. Throughout high-crime areas, comprehensive security plans have been developed in order to protect individuals. Precautions taken to do so include house alarms, tracking devices, on-call response teams, 24/7 security guard surveillance as well as real-time incident and threat reporting.

Due to a lack of security measures for the public sector, foreigners face a substantially lower crime rate than that faced by the public. However, westerners are often targeted by thieves as they are seen as affluent in comparison to PNG locals.

=== Regulatory bodies and law enforcement ===
Authorities and government agencies exist in Papua New Guinea to combat both violent and non-violent forms of crime. The Royal Papua New Guinea Constabulary (RPNGC) is responsible for maintaining law and order throughout the state while providing law enforcement services with jurisdiction throughout PNG.

Though local police services are renowned as unresponsive and corrupt, the RPNGC works effectively with Interpol's National Central Bureau (NCB) to fight organised crime. Directed by the Police Commissioner and situated at the RPNGC headquarters in Port Moresby, the NCB contributes to crime prevention in Papua New Guinea. This organisation encourages international communication and support through the provision of a database for international criminal data.

Papua New Guinea has legislation policies which aim to assist victims of crime who have been affected either physically or psychologically. In its 2000 Policy on Community Corrections, the Papua New Guinea Department of Attorney General (PNGDAG) made a verbal commitment regarding the protection of such victims. A 'ten-year plan'; The National Law and Justice Policy and Plan of Action 2001–2010, was also introduced in order to evolve a Victim Support Policy and reinforce the government's existing support structures.

Some methods utilised by Papua New Guinea's national police force have developed positively over time. However, the misuse of authority by police has become commonplace since the Arrest Act (1977) which enabled officials "to use all reasonable means to effect an arrest where a suspect resists arrest". Despite the prohibition of unnecessary force in the Police Act (1998) as well as a Code of Ethics implying that regulatory members will "respect and uphold the rights of all people in the community regardless of race, social status or religion"; the unlawful use of force by police has proved to be a distinguished complication.

Though capital punishment is legal in Papua New Guinea, it has not been inflicted on an individual since November 1954. Regulatory bodies in PNG still face challenges, particularly in gaining the support of local communities. A long-term deficit of resources, corruption as well as a lack of strength in numbers also stand as ongoing and disruptive restrictions.
