= Crime in Mauritania =

Since Oct. 2022 the U.S. Department of State has advised to reconsider travel to the West African nation of Mauritania. It warns: Violent crimes occur frequently outside the Tevragh Zeina neighborhoods in Nouakchott. They include mugging, armed robbery, and assault. Local police lack the resources to respond quickly and effectively to serious crimes. Opportunistic crime is prevalent in Mauritania. Several homes and private individuals, including U.S. citizens, have been targeted by violent criminals within the past five years.

In August 2007, Mauritanian police discovered 860 kilograms (1,896 lbs.) of cocaine concealed beneath rice sacks in a stationary minibus, marking the country's largest drug seizure at the time. The country was reported to have emerged as a key transit point for Colombian cocaine destined for lucrative markets in Europe, where the illicit use of the substance was escalating.
