= Crime in Kuwait =

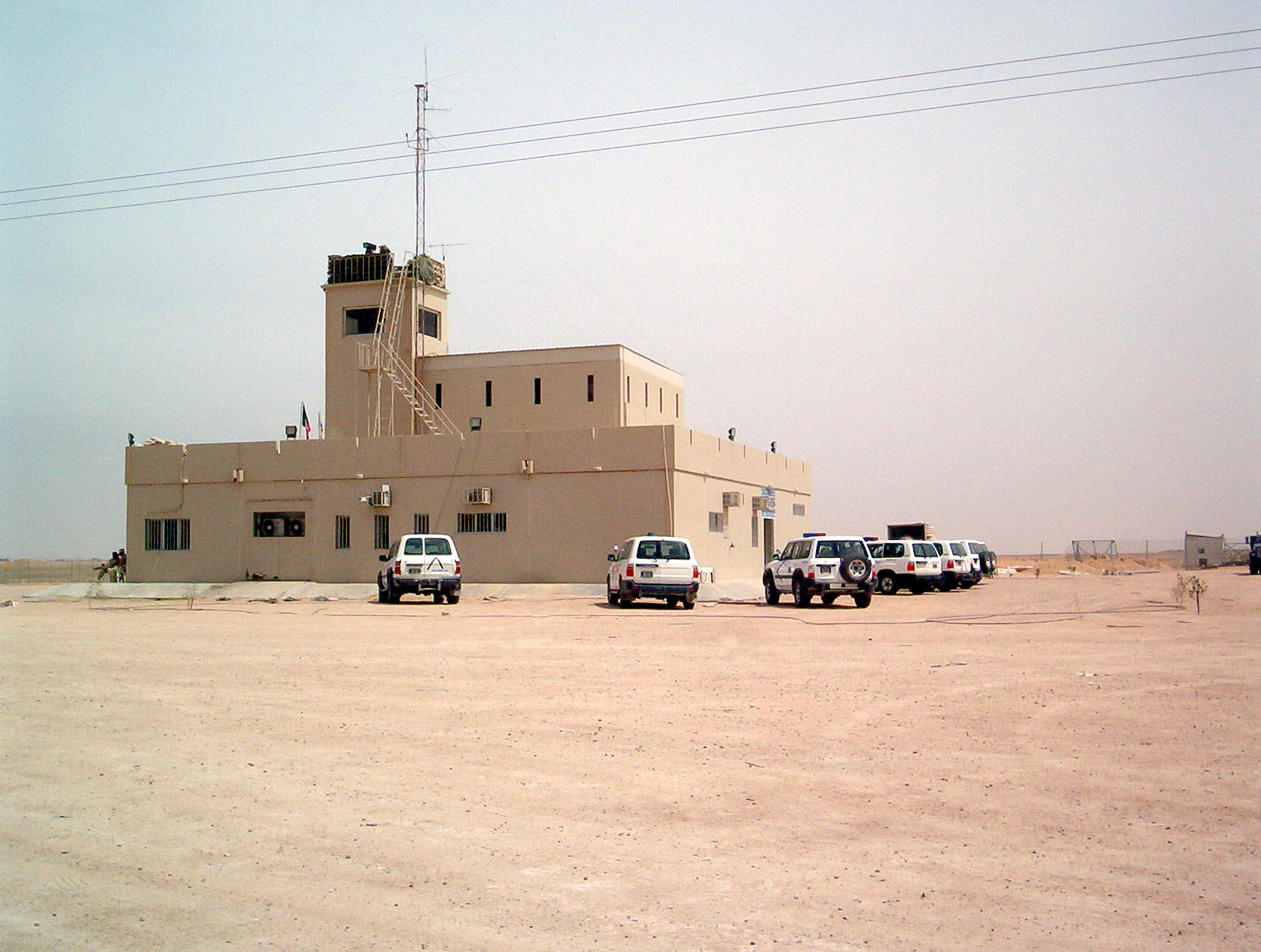
Kuwaiti police vehicles and police station

There is a low rate of crime in Kuwait. Incidents of violent crime against foreign citizens are extremely uncommon. The country is a destination point for men and women who migrate legally from South and Southeast Asia for domestic or low-skilled labor. People from South Asian countries like Bangladesh, India, Pakistan and Sri Lanka and Southeast Asian nations like the Philippines are trafficked into Kuwait. Kuwait along with Qatar, the United Arab Emirates and Saudi Arabia is in Tier 4 rank which has greater wealth, but a worse human trafficking situation.

== Crime by type ==
=== Terrorism ===
Threat of terrorist attack is a matter of concern. In the early 70's the terrorism threat was mostly against government targets perpetrated by various Palestinian factions. During the Iran - Iraq conflict terrorism was mainly by Iranian agents and supporters, where several bombings took place in public places including a suicide car bomb attempt against the ruler which failed. Also during the military buildup for Gulf War II there was a heightened terrorism threat by extremists with several attacks targeting foreigners. The government cracked down very hard against the budding extremist threat, and several high-profile confrontations took place. That along with strong action by the Saudi Arabian regime, seemed to have eliminated or greatly reduced the threat and Kuwait has not had a terrorist incident since 2015. Several Kuwaiti men linked to extremist elements have been known to have gone to Iraq to fight coalition forces, but that seems to have abated as local Iraqi militants seemed eager to use them as "suicide bombers" without the persons knowledge or consent. The Department of Foreign Affairs and Trade (DFAT) of the Government of Australia reported there is a high threat of terrorist attack in Kuwait. DFAT claimed they received reports that terrorists are masterminding attacks against assets belonging to the Government of Kuwait, hotels, restaurants and Western interests. The United States Department of State reported terrorists in the past attacked hotel chains which they believed belonged to westerners. Western housing complexes were also targeted by terrorist organizations. Terrorism in Kuwait may include bombing, hijacking, hostage taking, kidnapping and assassination. Both military and civilians are the potential targets of terrorist groups. According to the US State Department, terrorists can target oil infrastructure, public transportation, schools, places of worship, clubs, shopping complexes, etc., due to increased security measures in official US facilities. Although these places are potential targets of terrorist organization, DFAT emphasized "that attacks could occur at anytime, anywhere in Kuwait".
