= Crime in the Maldives =

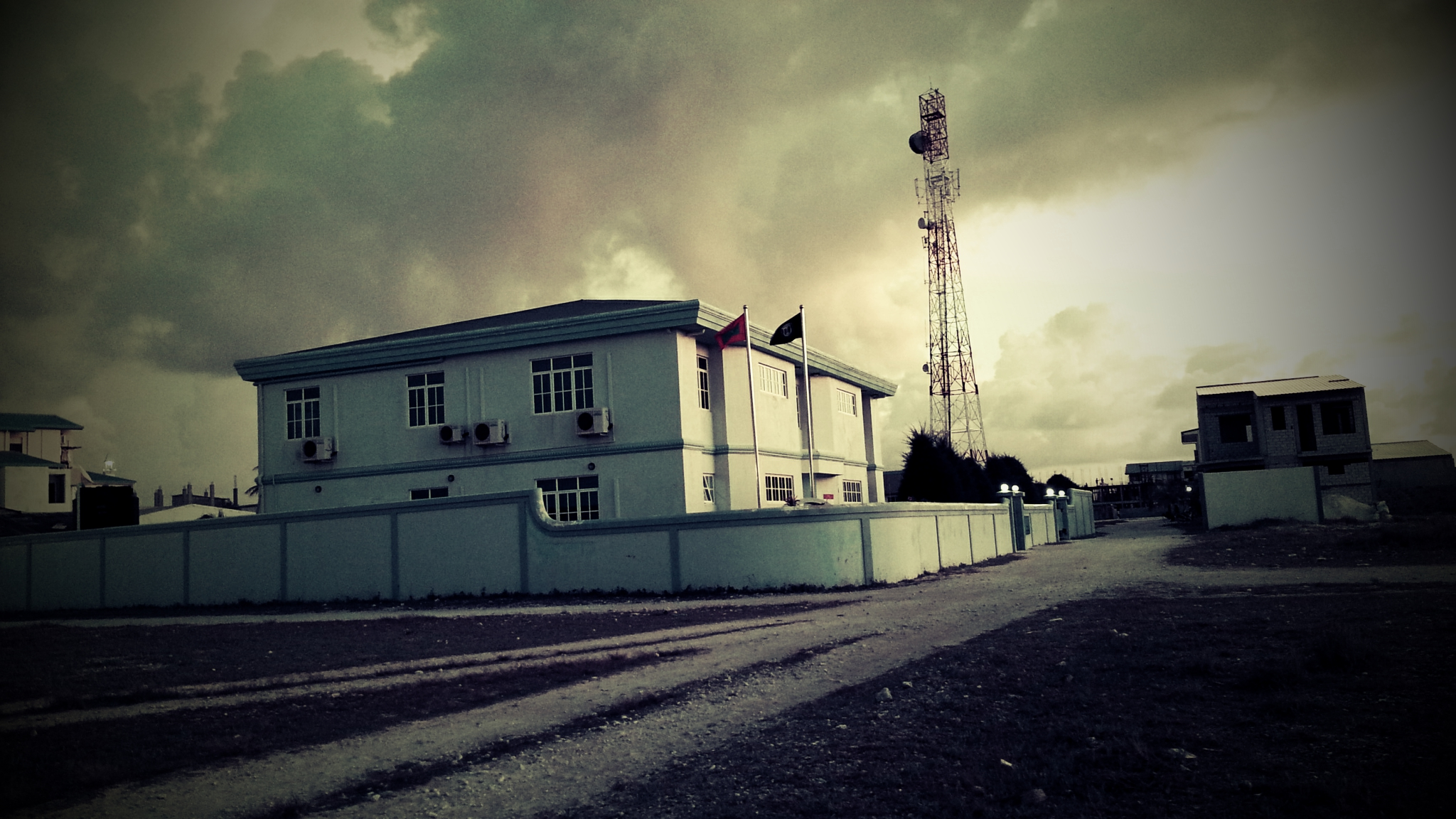
Naifaru Police Station.

Crime in the Maldives ranks from low to moderate, but crime rates in the country have increased significantly in recent years. Incidents of theft on beaches or in hotels do occur. Juvenile delinquency is a growing problem in the Maldives. According to the data available from the Ministry of Defence and National Security, there has been an increase in petty crime in the country. In 1992, 169 cases of petty crime were reported, while the number was 462 in 1996. The number of sentenced persons under the age of 19 also increased from 391 in 1988 to 512 in 1998. Fraud examiner Peter Lilley in his book Dirty Dealing writes that money laundering is not a significant problem in the Maldives.

"Drug abuse in Maldives has reached alarming levels, and, according to several ministries and high ranking officials, is now the most serious problem the country is facing."

— Report of the International Narcotics Control Board 2006

== Drug abuse ==
Drug abuse is increasing in the country. The Maldives are near one of two major illicit opium producing centers in Asia - the Golden Triangle comprising Myanmar, Thailand and Laos. Many tourists visit the country from different parts of the world like Europe, the Middle East, South Asia, and East Asia. These factors make the Maldives vulnerable as a point for illegal shipments of drugs meant for other nations. Abuse of illegally produced heroin is a visible problem in the Maldives as well as other South Asian countries like Bangladesh, India, Nepal and Sri Lanka. The United Nations Office on Drugs and Crime (UNODC) believes that drug trafficking in the Maldives is a side effect of the nation's increased exposure to the outside world. Drug abuse is also associated with increasing incidents of theft and robbery.

== Terrorism ==
Threat of terrorist attacks is a matter of concern. The Department of Foreign Affairs and Trade (DFAT) of the Government of Australia advises travelers "to exercise caution" because of the high threat of terrorism. According to the Foreign, Commonwealth and Development Office (FCDO), "Attacks could be indiscriminate, including in places visited by foreigners".

== Crime statistics ==
Rate of criminal homicide and assault in the Maldives declined by 30% between the years 1997–2002. Crime involving bribery and fraud also declined by 33% during this time. The Corruption Perceptions Index in 2023 ranked the Maldives 93rd best out of 180 countries in terms of corruption. On a scale of 0 to 100, with 0 being the least and hundred being most transparent, Transparency International rated the Maldives 39.
