= Crime in Qatar =

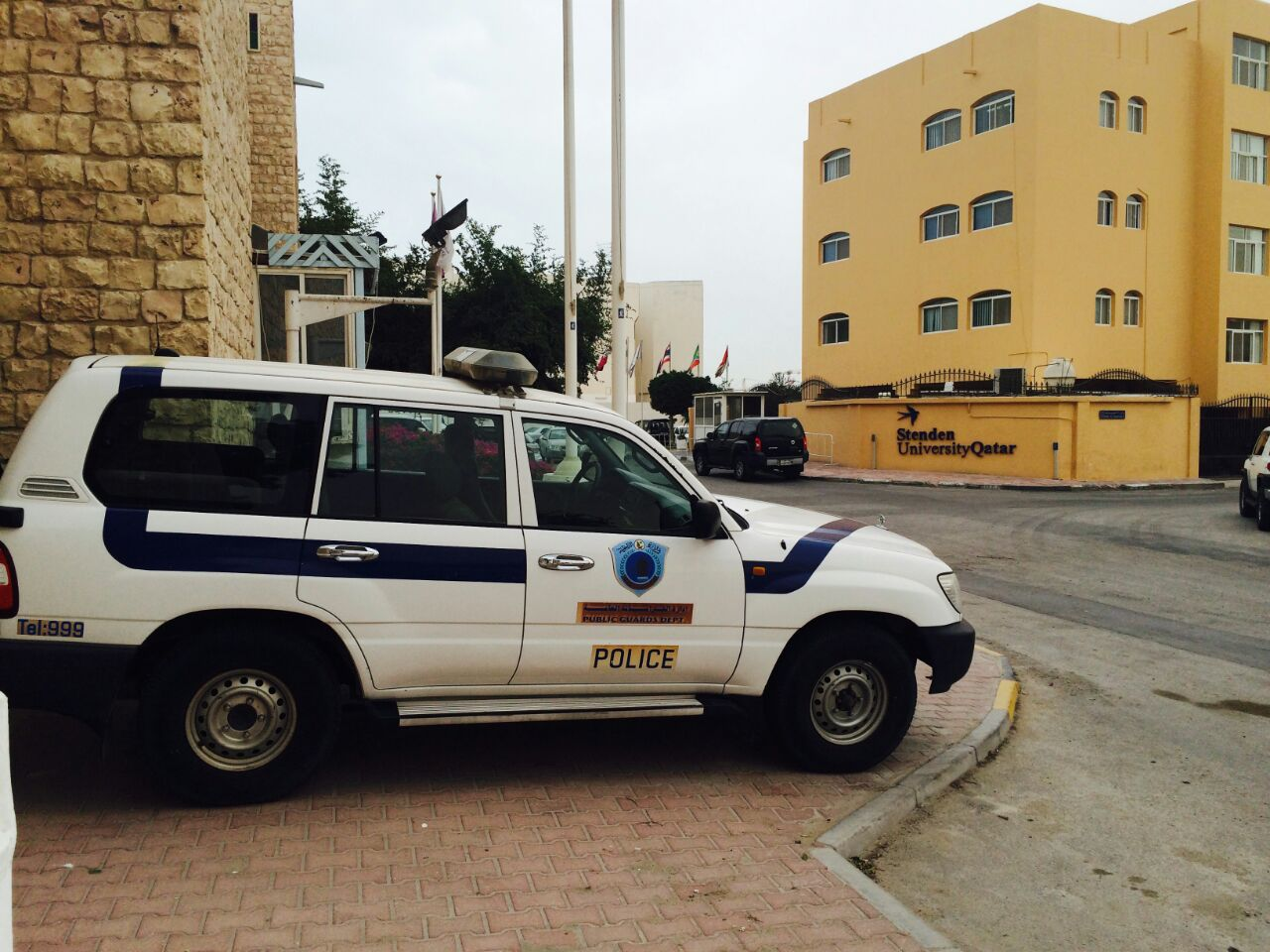
Police vehicle on the streets of Qatar

Crime in Qatar is very low compared to industrialized nations. Petty crime such as pickpocketing and bag snatching does occur, but is extremely uncommon. Although incidents of violence are generally considered to be rare, violence has occurred more frequently amid an increase in the population of Doha, the capital and largest city of Qatar, and economic pressures on expatriate workers over the last few years.

== Targeting immigrants ==
Debt bondage, delayed or non-payment of salaries, confiscation of passports, and other abuse occurs. These crimes are often not recorded as crimes. Many crimes are not reported, in particular sexual crimes because it is not generally safe for victims to do so. According to the CIA World Factbook, Qatar is on the "Tier 2 Watch List". It "does not fully comply with the minimum standards for the elimination of trafficking; however, it is making significant efforts to do so...".

In the past, trafficked, kidnapped or exploited children were sometimes brought into the country from south Asia to use as camel jockeys. The former Emir of Qatar, Hamad Al Thani, banned child jockeys in 2005 and directed that, by 2007, all camel races would be directed by robotic jockeys.

In October 2011, Qatar enacted comprehensive anti-trafficking legislation, Law No.15 that prohibited all forms of trafficking and prescribed penalties, including fines (the equivalent of $82,000) and imprisonment of up to 15 years.

== Terrorism ==
Threat of terrorist attack is a matter of concern. Al-Qaeda has threatened Western citizens in the region. The Department of Foreign Affairs and Trade (DFAT) of the Government of Australia advised travelers "to exercise a high degree of caution in Qatar" due to high threat of terrorism. On 14 June 2022, the institute for economics and peace (an Australia based global think tank) issued a report in which Qatar has been ranked 1st in MENA region and 23rd globally in terms of safety. This report is based on three main criteria: the level of safety and security in society, the extent of domestic and international conflict, and the degree of militarization. According to State Department report published in April 2022 on international terrorism, American technological support for Qatari law enforcement and judicial institutions had been increased as the country uses national funds to pay for participation in State's Anti-Terrorism Assistance (ATA) training program. There have been no terrorist incidents reported in Qatar since. The DFAT claimed they received reports of terrorist plans to attack a range of targets in the nation. A suicide car bombing at the Doha Players theater on March 19, 2005, which was the first attack of its kind in the nation, killed a British citizen and injured twelve other people. The bomber was an Egyptian named Omar Ahmed Abdullah Ali. On March 17, 2005, Saleh al-Oufi, Saudi head of al-Qaeda, urged attacks against what he called "crusader" enemies in Qatar and in other countries like Bahrain, Oman and the United Arab Emirates.

== Corruption ==
In the Corruption Perceptions Index 2007, Qatar was ranked 32nd out of 179 countries for corruption (least corrupt countries are at the top of the list). On a scale of 0 to 10, with 0 being the most corrupt and 10 the most transparent, Transparency International rated Qatar 6.0. Alex Cobham of the Center for Global Development reported in 2013 that "many of the staff and chapters" at Transparency International, the publisher of Corruptions Perceptions index "protest internally" over concerns about the index.

== Interpol data ==
According to Interpol data, criminal homicide rate in Qatar increased from 1.52 to 2.11 per 100,000 population between 1995 and 1999. It was an increase of 38.8%. The rate for rape decreased by 67.1%, but the rate of robbery increased by 100%. While the rate of robbery was 0.67 per 100,000 population in 1995, it increased to 1.34 per 100,000 population in 1999. Similarly the rate of aggravated assault, larceny and motor vehicle theft increased by 75.1%, 73.1% and 13.5% respectively.
