= Crime in Iran =

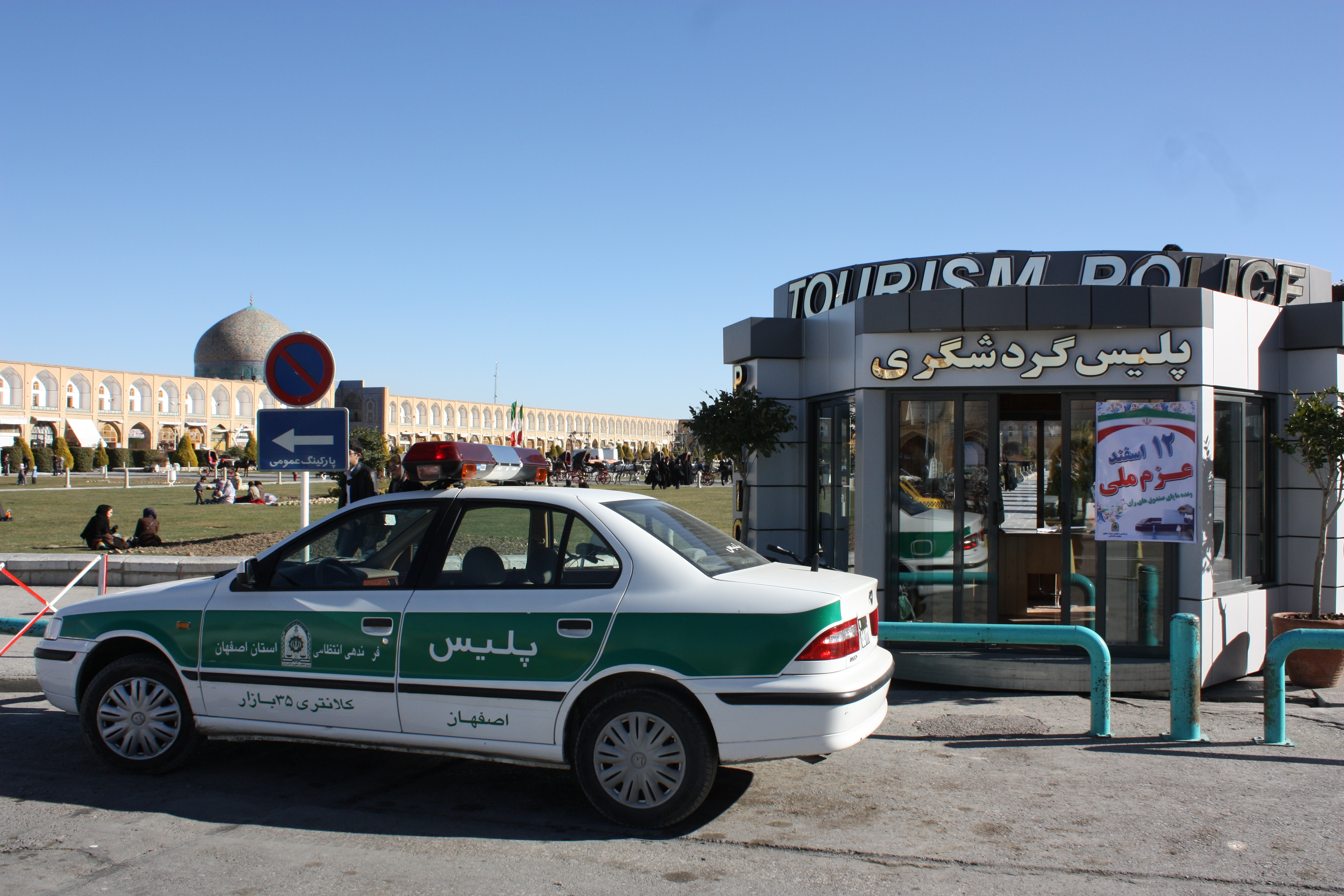
An Iranian police car

Crime in Iran is present in various forms, and may include the following offences: murder, kidnapping, theft, fraud, money laundering, drug trafficking, drug dealing, alcohol smuggling, oil smuggling, tax evasion, terrorism, homosexuality, Guidance Patrol, eating and drinking during Ramadan, drinking alcohol, and many other crimes.

== Drug trafficking and money laundering ==
Drug trafficking is a major and ongoing issue in Iran. Iran is a key transshipment point for Southwest Asian heroin between Afghanistan and Europe. With 2.8 percent of the population addicted to drugs, Iran has one of the highest rates of drug addiction in the world, rivaling the 10 - 15% in Afghanistan. According to published figures, Iran has so far lost close to 3,500 police and security officers to the anti-drug campaign that annually costs the country almost $1 billion and inflicts an annual damage of about $8.5 billion on Iran's economy. Hundreds of drug smugglers have also been hanged.

It has been estimated by the government of Iran in 2015 that dirty money from drug trafficking in Iran amounts to 10 trillion toumans a year (1 touman equals 1000 rials), some of which has been finding its way into "elections and the securing of votes" to influence the country's politics.

=== Opium ===
The majority of drug users in Iran use opium. Iran produces almost none of its own opium; the opium is brought into the country from neighboring Afghanistan. In 2006, over 53 percent of the opium produced in Afghanistan left the country through Iran. Several measures have been taken by the Iranian authorities to combat drug trafficking. This includes increasing the number of police forces on the southeastern border of Iran and introducing severe laws and penalties for people found guilty of drug trafficking.

Iran has become a leading figure in combating drug trafficking; so far Iranian authorities have made over 85 percent of the world's total opium seizures. Between 2009 and 2010, the amount of illicit drugs seized by Iranian police totalled over 340 tons.

== Tax evasion ==
Tax evaders typically are either involved in activities in the gray sector of economy or in the underground market which they do not divulge. Others are engaged in smuggling and the black market. The losses are equivalent to 20% to 25% of the country's gross domestic product revenue. In 2014, international medias reported Iranian nationals to be listed among the tax evaders in the HSBC scandal in Switzerland.

== Human trafficking ==
According to the U.S. Department of State: "Iran is a source, transit, and destination for women trafficked for the purposes of sexual exploitation and involuntary servitude. Iranian women are trafficked internally for the purpose of forced prostitution and for forced marriages to settle debts. Iranian children are trafficked internally and Afghan children are trafficked to Iran for the purpose of forced marriages, commercial sexual exploitation and involuntary servitude as beggars or laborers. According to non-governmental sources, Iranian women and girls are also trafficked to Pakistan, Turkey, Qatar, Kuwait, the United Arab Emirates, France, Germany, and the United Kingdom for commercial sexual exploitation."

== Alcohol smuggling ==
Iran began restricting alcohol production and consumption shortly after the Iranian Revolution. Even with this ban, alcohol smuggling is still popular in Iran today. It is reported that over 2.5 million dollars of alcohol is smuggled into Iran every day. Smugglers often have a hard time smuggling alcohol into Iran; border security forces repeatedly clash with smugglers and many die.

== Oil smuggling ==
Oil smuggling has become more of an issue in Iran. Iranians pay an average price of 25 cents a liter for gasoline while neighboring countries pay more than a dollar per liter which makes oil smuggling a profitable business for smugglers. Every year in Iran, over 1.8 billion liters of refined oil products are smuggled to neighboring countries. These countries include Afghanistan, Iraq, Pakistan and Turkey.

== Honor killing ==
In Iran, there have been a number of recorded cases of honor killings that made international headlines.

In May 2021, a London-based filmmaker, 46-year-old Babak Khorramdin was stabbed to death by his 74 year old mother, Iran Khorramdin and 81 year old father, Akbar Khorramdin in the middle of an argument after they found out that their son is still single at this age and that he doesn't want to be married. After the murder, Khorramdin's body was mutilated, chopped into pieces and were put in three separate bags. Furthermore, the same couple had also killed Babak's sister and brother-in-law prior to his death. The parents accused their son of harassment and for making an attempt to ruin their reputation. Furthermore, they stated that they "were proud" and "showed no remorse".

In February 2022 a video circulated in Iran of a man (Sajjad Heydari), in Ahvaz, Khuzestan in Western Iran, smiling and carrying the severed head of his 17 year old wife (Mona Heydari). The IRNA news agency referred to the incident as the result of an "honor killing." The wife had fled to Turkey but was brought back to Iran and killed shortly after. According to human rights lawyer Yonah Diamond, "the Iranian authorities enabled the barbaric beheading of Mona Heydari -- a child bride -- for seeking a divorce from a violently abusive marriage..."

Two years earlier another high-profile "honor killing" involved a 14-year-old who was allegedly killed with a sickle by her father in northern Iran's Talesh County, after she ran away from her family home with a 29-year-old man.

According to the medical journal The Lancet, there were at least 8,000 honor killings in Iran between 2010 and 2014, of which only a few were reported.

Article 630 of the Constitution exempts a husband from punishment if he murders his wife for committing adultery.

Iran International reports that about 60 women have fallen victim to honor killings from 2020 to 2021, according to a women's right NGO in Ahvaz, "including some who were 10 or 15 years old. None of the perpetrators have been brought to justice" and few of the families have even filed a lawsuit.

== Punishment ==
Iran has one of the highest execution rates (second only to China). Adultery and homosexual sex are considered illegal acts under Iranian law and under certain circumstances may carry the death penalty. Punishment for drug use and trafficking can be severe; anyone convicted of having possession of, using or trafficking in illegal drugs can expect long jail sentences, heavy fines and even the death penalty.

== See also ==
- Smuggling in Iran
- Corruption in Iran
- Human trafficking
- Illegal drug trade
- Alcohol in Iran
- Capital punishment in Iran
- Economy of Iran
