= Crime in Yemen =

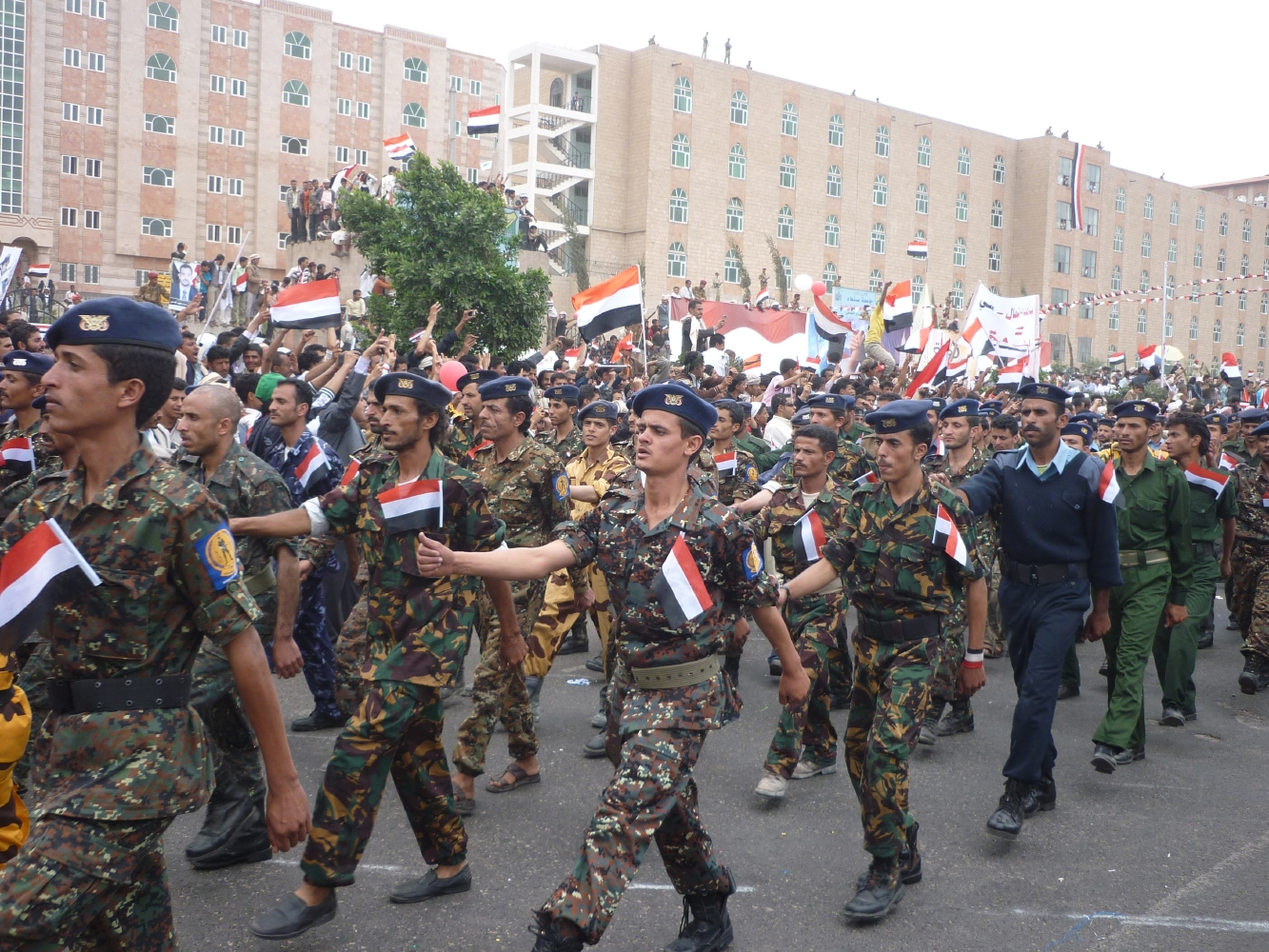
Yemeni soldiers from the Yemeni Police.

Crime is present in various forms in Yemen.

== Crimes against foreigners in Yemen ==
There are many instances of crimes against foreigners in Yemen. This includes petty crime and violent crime, both of which usually happen in locations with many people. One serious instance of violent crime against foreigners in Yemen would be the 2008 attack on the American Embassy in Yemen, in Sana'a, Yemen on September 17, 2008, which ultimately resulted in the loss of nineteen lives and 16 injuries. Fake merchandise can be easily found in Yemen.

== Crimes against women in Yemen ==
=== Honor killing ===
Honor killings are common in Yemen. In some parts of the country, traditional tribal customs forbid contact between men and women before marriage. Yemeni society is strongly male dominated, Yemen being ranked last of 135 countries in the 2012 Global Gender Gap Report. It was estimated that in 1997 about 400 women and girls died in honor killings in Yemen. In 2013, a 15-year-old girl was killed by her father, who burned her to death, because she talked to her fiancé before the wedding.

=== Prostitution ===
Prostitution is a significant and growing issue in Yemen. While it is officially illegal, many sex tourists from other gulf states indulge in what are known as "tourist marriages". Prostitutes can also be found in select nightclubs. The punishment for prostitution in the country is 3 years of imprisonment. As many people in Yemen are stricken with poverty, children are often sold off by their parents as prostitutes. Despite the high rate of prostitution in the country, the government has instead chosen to assign its efforts on part of the war on terror, and this issue is largely ignored.

== Corruption and police misconduct ==
Official seal of the United States Department of State

According to the United States Department of State, "[l]ocal police forces are largely unaccountable", and there are known cases of corruption in the Yemeni police force. Law enforcement in the country is said to be very poor, and both the police and the government in Yemen are deemed to be unworthy of trust. Very often law enforcers in the country abuse their authority to allow others to evade tax or get away with minor or major offences, provided currency exchanged for the favour. Corruption in the country damaged the government budget.

== See also ==
- Outline of Yemen
