= Crime in Sri Lanka =

Crime is a present in various forms in Sri Lanka. Crime is segmented into two broad classifications: grave crimes (those which are indictable) and minor crimes (those which are not). Exceptions can be made for criminal liability on the grounds of duress, insanity, intoxication, necessity, and private defense. Punishment for crime includes several options: community service, fine, forfeiture of property, imprisonment, institutional treatment, probation, suspended sentence, and death; while the death penalty is available in the country, there have been no executions since 1976. Corporal punishments (whipping) has been abolished as of 2005.

Since 2026, Sri Lankan officials claim that fraud factories are popping up after crackdowns in Cambodia and Myanmar. The rise is attributed to lenient visa policies and high-speed internet.

== Statistics ==
Year	Total Murders
2005	1,388
2006	3,251
2007	2,089
2008	1,924
2009	1,096
2010	756
2011	767
2012	675
2013	585
2014	547
2015	476
2016	502
2017	452
2018	593
2019	273
2020	497
2021	522
2022	523
2023	146

Grave crimes reported in 2019
Grave Crime	Cases Recorded
Abduction	10980
Kidnapping	10030
Arson	13458
Mischief over Rs. 25,000	45680
House Breaking	224358
Grievous Hurt	10925
Voluntarily Causing Hurt by Dangerous Weapons	5678
Homicide	2005
Attempt to Homicide / Abatement to commit suicide	3456
Rape of Women over 16 years of age	1674
Statutory Rape (Women under 16 years) With the consent of the victim	10765
Statutory Rape (Women under 16 years) Without the consent of the victim	56783
Unlawful Assembly / Riot	9083
Robbery	4770
Unnatural offenses / Grave Sexual Abuse	8921
Extortion	5040
Cheating, Misappropriation, Criminal Breach of Trust in respect of over Rs. 300,000	67457
Praedial Products Theft over Rs. 25,000	1120
Cattle Theft over Rs. 25,000	7740
Properties Theft Over Rs. 25,000	107298
Counterfeiting Currencies and Possession	6709
Offenses against the state	3579
Cruelty to children	90400
Sexual Exploitation of Children	256
Procuration and Trafficking of persons	300
Offenses under the offensive weapons act	3000
Possession of automatic or repeater shot guns	8000
The Manufacture of any quantity of Heroin, Cocaine, Morphine, Trafficking, Import, Export or possession of dangerous Drugs of and above 2gms of Heroin, 2gms or more of Cocaine, 3gms or more of Morphine, 500gms or more of Opium, 5 kg or more of cannabis and 1 kg of Hashish.	10012
Obstructions to Police Officers	2550
Total	680400

== Crimes against women and children ==
Sri Lanka is a participant in the prostitution industry, and most consumers of the trade in the country are foreign travellers. Nevertheless, most prostitution-related acts, such as prostitute trafficking and procuring are illegal. Prostitution has not become as severe an issue in Sri Lanka as compared to the situation in some neighbouring countries.

Child trafficking is a problem in Sri Lanka. Most children trafficked are treated unfairly, being forced into sex slavery and the filming of child sexual abuse material.

== Corruption ==
Corruption is prevalent in Sri Lanka. Cited as "one of the most corrupt nations in the world" by Lakshman Indranath Keerthisinghe of the Lanka Standard, there have been instances in which law enforcers take bribes from offenders who wish to have their offences waived. The government has made an effort to curb corruption in the country and a handful of corrupt individuals have been arrested and appropriately charged.

Corruption is considered a large expense to the Sri Lankan government. However, corruption does not appear to be significant enough to pose a problem with foreign investment, though it is considered to be a persistent issue with customs clearance and smuggling of some consumer products.

== Investigation ==
View source data.
Reported homicides, 2015–2019

The crime division of the Police Department of Sri Lanka has several branches. Its primary mission is to protect against all types of crimes in the country. It makes appropriate coordination with civil and military agencies, apprehends criminals, and take appropriate legal actions after the commitment of crime. The department previously held the Logistics portfolio led by DIG Valentine S. Vamadevan and also later had the Police Human Rights Division which was established in 2002 with a mandate to examine and prevent human rights violations with which their officers may be charged while on duty.

== See also ==
- Alleged war crimes during the final stages of the Sri Lankan Civil War
