= Crime in Jordan =

Jordan safety and crime

Hashemite Kingdom of Jordan
- Crime rates*

Violent crimes
- Homicide: 1.0
- Robbery: 6.1

Property crimes
- Burglary: 0.0
- Total property crime: Insufficient data available.
- Notes *Number of reported crimes per 100,000 population. Source: Crime Statistics - Jordan

Jordan is generally regarded as one of the safer countries in the Middle East, with a relatively low crime rate compared to global standards. However, like any country, it does experience certain types of criminal activity. Understanding the nature and extent of crime in Jordan can provide valuable insights into the country’s safety, especially for visitors and expatriates.

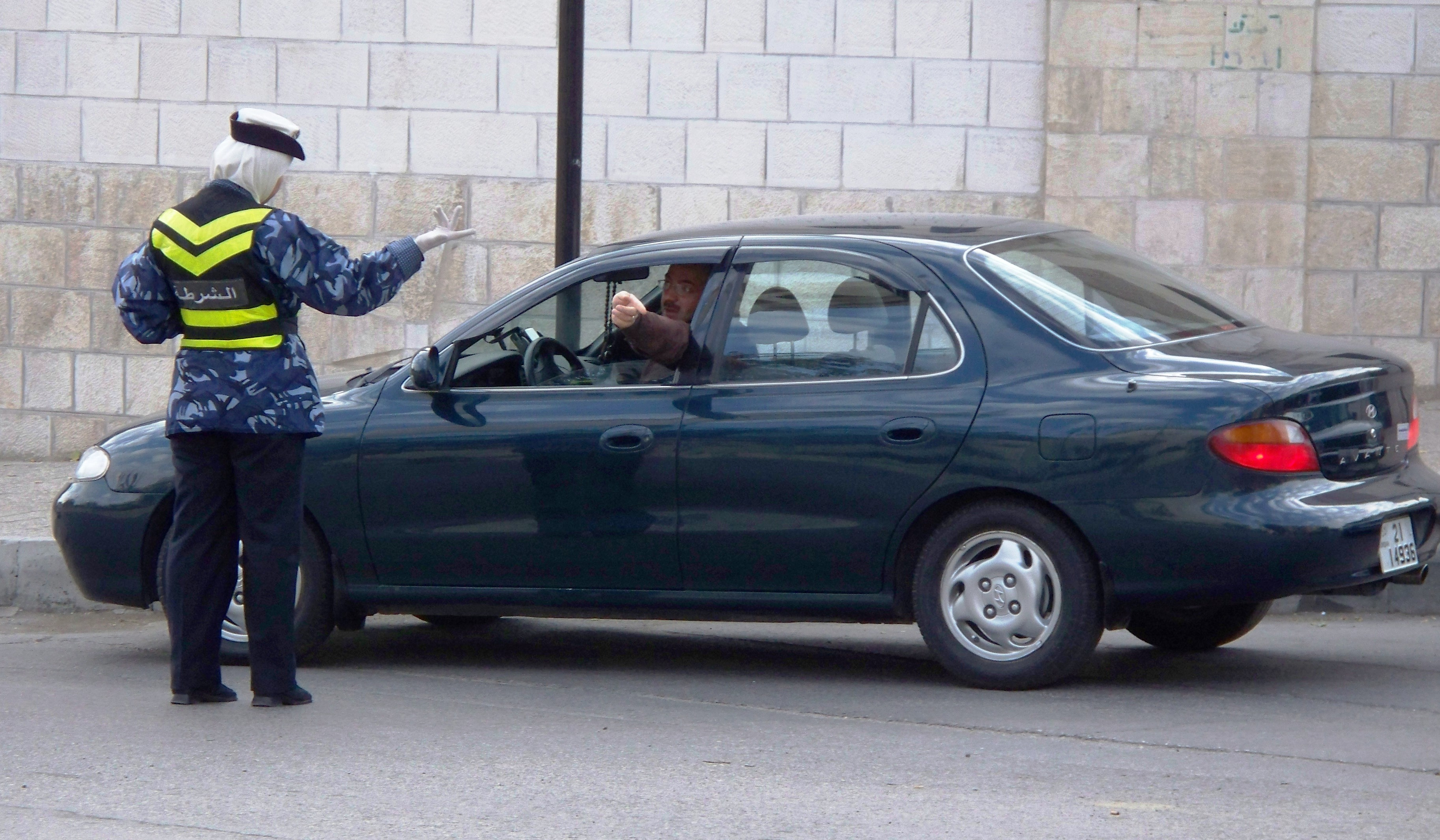
A female police officer in Amman

== Crime rate and types of crime ==
The homicide rate in Jordan was approximately 1.1 per 100,000 people in 2022. Property crimes such as theft and robbery are present but at lower rates compared to many other nations.

Violent crimes, including armed robbery and assaults, are rare. Petty crimes like pickpocketing and bag snatching can occur, particularly in crowded areas or tourist sites, but these incidents are relatively infrequent. The risk of more severe violent crime, such as muggings, is low, especially outside major urban areas.

=== Safety perception and public confidence ===
The general perception of safety in Jordan is high. According to the Numbeo Crime Index, Jordan has a crime index score of around 40.65, placing it in the low to moderate range. This perception reflects the public’s confidence in the country’s security and law enforcement agencies. Most Jordanians feel safe walking alone during daylight hours, and while safety at night is slightly lower, it still remains at a respectable level.

== Law enforcement and counterterrorism ==
Jordan has a strong law enforcement presence, with various security agencies actively involved in maintaining public order and safety. The country has also been a key player in regional counterterrorism efforts. Despite being in a volatile region, Jordan has managed to thwart numerous terrorist plots and maintain a secure environment for its citizens and visitors.

2022 Terrorist Incidents: There were no terrorist incidents reported in Jordan in 2022. Jordan continued to reinforce its border defenses and surveillance capabilities in response to terrorist and criminal threats emanating from its 230-mile border with Syria and 112-mile border with Iraq. The government has made interdicting drugs smuggled across its borders a top security priority.

Countering the Financing of Terrorism: The Financial Action Task Force (FATF) ) announced the removal of Jordan from the list of countries under increased monitoring in the field of anti-money laundering and counter terrorist financing, or what is known as the “gray list,” at its general meeting held during the period from 23-27 of this July 2024 in the French capital, Paris. In the presence of the Governor of the Central Bank of Jordan, Dr. Adel Al-Sharkas, Chairman of the National Committee for anti-Money Laundering and counter Terrorist Financing, and the presence of the Head of the Anti-Money Laundering and Counter-Terrorism Financing Unit.

== Corruption and bribery ==
One area of concern in Jordan is the perception of corruption and bribery, which is considered moderately high. This issue is more prevalent in bureaucratic and administrative sectors rather than everyday interactions with the police or security forces. However, this has not significantly impacted the overall safety of the country.

== Honor killing ==
A 2008 report of the National Council of Family Affairs in Jordan, an NGO affiliated with the Queen of Jordan, indicated that the National Forensic Medicine Center recorded 120 murdered women in 2006, with 18 cases classified officially as crimes of honor. In 2013, the BBC cited estimates by the National Council of Family Affairs in Jordan, an NGO, that as many as 50 Jordanian women and girls had been murdered in the preceding 13 years. But the BBC indicated "the real figure" was probably "far higher," because "most honor killings go unreported."

Men used to receive reduced sentences for killing their wives or female family members if they are deemed to have brought dishonor to their family. Families often get sons under the age of 16—legally minors—to commit honor killings; the juvenile law allows convicted minors to serve time in a juvenile detention center and be released with a clean criminal record at the age of 16. Rana Husseini, a leading journalist on the topic of honor killings, states that "under the existing law, people found guilty of committing honor killings often receive sentences as light as six months in prison". According to UNICEF, there are an average of 23 honor killings per year in Jordan.

On 1 August 2017, article 98 in the penal codes were amended to exclude honor criminals from receiving lenient punishments for being in "a state of great fury". However, article 340 which sees reduced penalties when a man attacks or kills a female relative having found her in the act of "adultery", is still in effect.

A 2013 survey of "856 ninth-graders—average age of 15—from a range of secondary schools across Amman—including private and state, mixed-sex and single-gender" showed that attitudes favoring honor killings are present in the "next generation" Jordanians: "In total, 33.4% of all respondents either "agreed" or "strongly agreed" with situations depicting honor killings. Boys were more than twice as likely to support honor killings: 46.1% of boys and 22.1% of girls agreed with at least two honor killing situations in the questionnaire." The parents' education was found to be a significant correlation: "61% of teenagers from the lowest level of educational background showed supportive attitudes towards honor killing, as opposed to only 21.1% where at least one family member has a university degree."

== Human trafficking and prevention ==
=== Documented cases ===
In 2022, Jordan experienced a significant increase in human trafficking cases compared to the previous year. According to official reports, 131 confirmed victims were registered in 2022, a notable rise from the 61 victims reported in 2021. The Public Security Directorate's Anti-Human Trafficking Unit conducted 86 inspections in 2022, highlighting the growing efforts to address the issue. However, 181 potential victims were housed in shelters during the same year, a stark contrast to the 131 housed in 2021.

The increased numbers in 2022 can be attributed to enhanced monitoring and investigative mechanisms, including the implementation of a national referral mechanism (NRM). This mechanism aimed to streamline the identification and support of trafficking victims. Additionally, legal reforms, such as amendments to the 2009 anti-trafficking law, strengthened penalties for traffickers. Despite these efforts, the U.S. Department of State's Trafficking in Persons Report maintained Jordan's tier 2 classification, acknowledging the government's improvements while noting shortcomings, such as lenient sentencing and continued exploitation under the visa sponsorship system.

The rise in cases is partly due to better detection, but challenges remain in prosecuting traffickers and protecting victims from further exploitation. The increase in labor inspections and legal amendments should continue to evolve, particularly concerning vulnerable populations such as migrant workers, refugees, and domestic workers.

=== Prosecution ===
The government increased law enforcement efforts. The 2009 Law on the Prevention of Trafficking in Human Beings criminalized sex trafficking and labor trafficking. As amended, the law prescribed penalties of imprisonment and a fine between 3,000 ($4,240) and 10,000 ($14,120) Jordanian dinars for adult labor trafficking. The amended law did not provide a range for the sentence of imprisonment, but in such cases the penal code provided a default sentence of between three and 15 years’ imprisonment. The amended law prescribed penalties of at least seven years’ imprisonment, and a fine between 5,000 ($7,060) and 20,000 ($28,250) Jordanian dinars for adult and child sex trafficking and child labor trafficking. These penalties were sufficiently stringent and, with respect to sex trafficking, commensurate with penalties prescribed for other serious crimes, such as kidnapping.

== Cyber crimes ==
Though not as prevalent as other crimes facilitated by the internet, cybercrimes still have a presence in Jordan. Cybercriminals often attempt to steal data, disrupt networks, and exploit infrastructure to launch more attacks. Reports have suggested an increase in the number of malware attacks in the country. Other common forms of cybercrimes in Jordan are the use of spyware and ransomware attempts.
