= Outline of Slovenia =

Country in southern Central Europe

The Flag of Slovenia

The Coat of arms of Slovenia

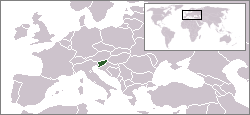
The location of Slovenia

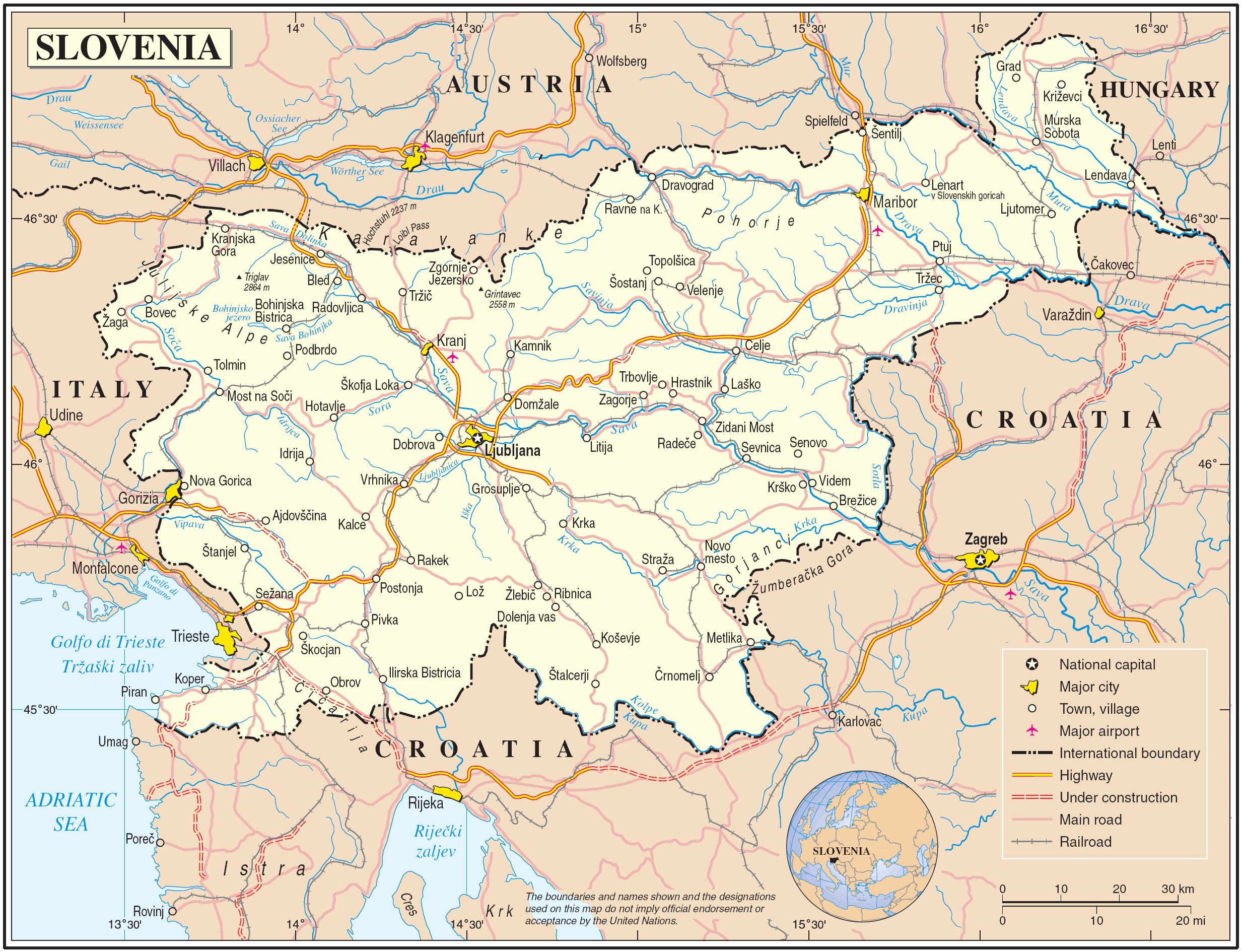
An enlargeable map of the Republic of Slovenia

The following outline is provided as an overview of and topical guide to Slovenia:

Slovenia – sovereign country located in southern Central Europe bordering Italy to the west, the Adriatic Sea to the southwest, Croatia to the south and east, Hungary to the northeast, and Austria to the north. The capital of Slovenia is Ljubljana. At various points in Slovenia's history, the country has been part of the Roman Empire, the Byzantine Empire, the Republic of Venice, the Duchy of Carantania (only modern Slovenia's northern part), the Holy Roman Empire, the Habsburg monarchy, the Austrian Empire (later known as Austria-Hungary), the State of Slovenes, Croats and Serbs, the Kingdom of Serbs, Croats and Slovenes (renamed to Kingdom of Yugoslavia in 1929) between the two World Wars, and the Socialist Federal Republic of Yugoslavia from 1945 until gaining independence in 1991. Slovenia is one of the only Yugoslavian communist states alongside Croatia (other non-Yugoslav former communist states include Lithuania, Latvia, and Estonia which meet the criteria) to be at the same time a member of the European Union, the Eurozone, the Schengen area, the Organization for Security and Co-operation in Europe, the Council of Europe and NATO.

== General reference ==
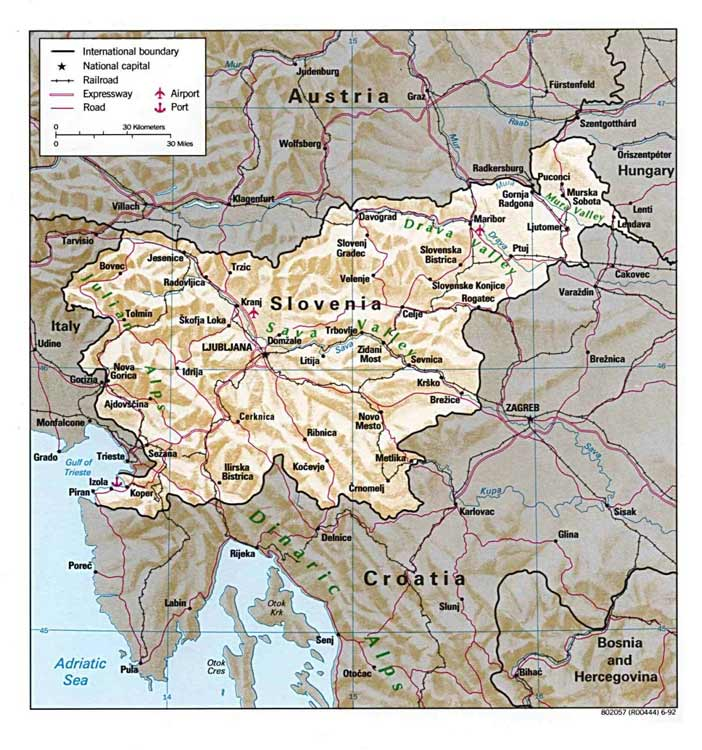
An enlargeable relief map of Slovenia

- Common English country name: Slovenia
- Pronunciation: /sloʊˈviːniə/
- Official English country name: The Republic of Slovenia
- Common endonym: Slovenija
- Official endonym: Republika Slovenija
- Adjectives: Slovene, Slovenian
- Demonym(s): Slovene, Slovenian
- Etymology: Name of Slovenia
- International rankings of Slovenia
- ISO country codes: SI, SVN, 705
- ISO region codes: See ISO 3166-2:SI
- Internet country code top-level domain: .si

== Geography of Slovenia ==
An enlargeable topographic map of Slovenia

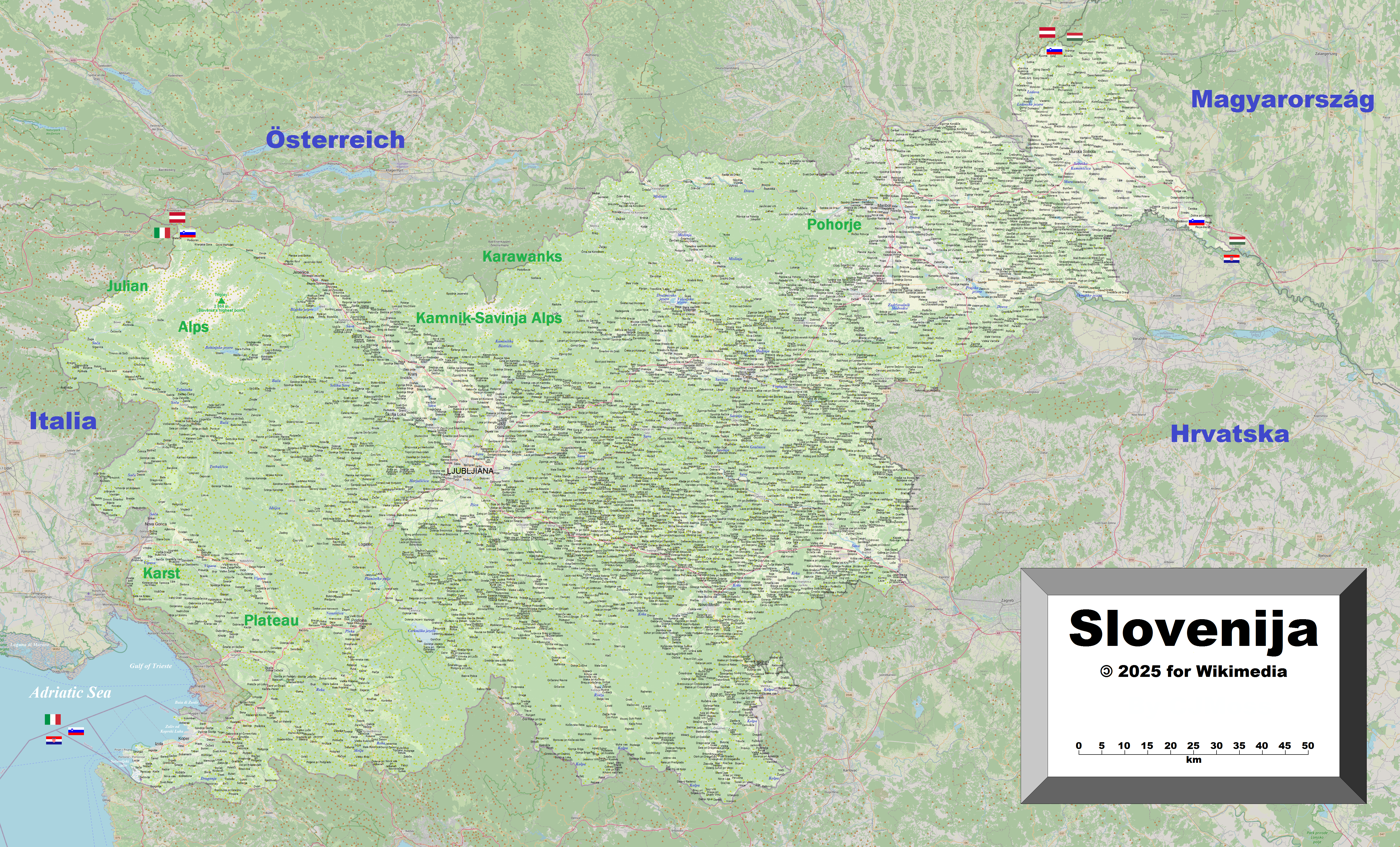
An enlargeable map showing Slovenia's cities, towns and villages

Geography of Slovenia

- Slovenia is: a country
- Location:
  - Northern Hemisphere and Eastern Hemisphere
  - Eurasia
    - Europe
      - Central Europe
      - Southern Europe
  - Time zone: Central European Time (UTC+01), Central European Summer Time (UTC+02)
  - Extreme points of Slovenia
    - High: Triglav 2,864 m (9,396 ft)
    - Low: Adriatic Sea 0 m
  - Land boundaries: 1,086 km

Croatia 455 km
Austria 330 km
Italy 199 km
Hungary 102 km

- Coastline: Adriatic Sea 46.6 km

- Population of Slovenia: 2,029,000 (July 15, 2008) - 143rd most populous country
- Area of Slovenia: 20,271 km^{2}
- Atlas of Slovenia

=== Environment of Slovenia ===
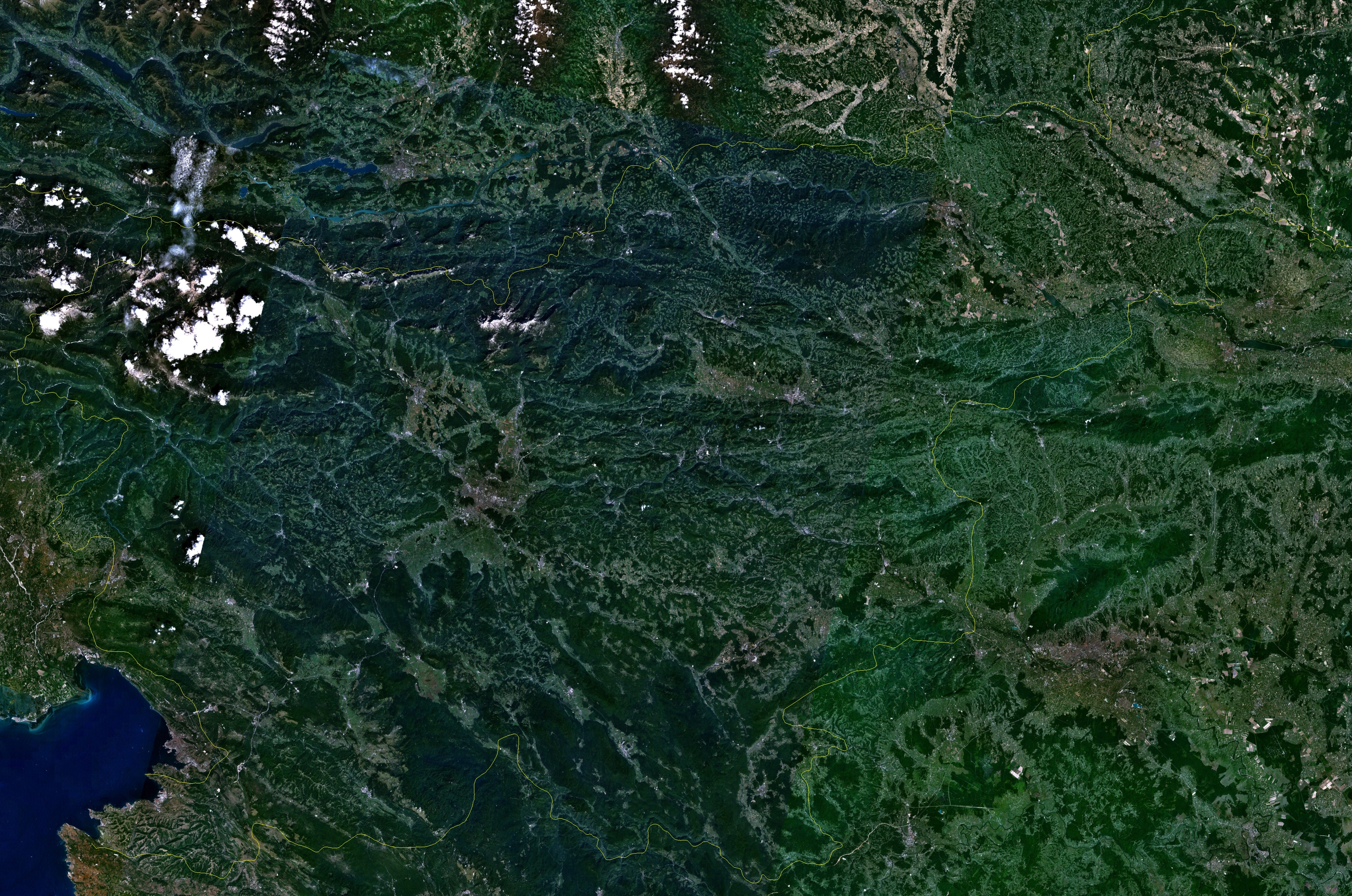
An enlargeable satellite image of Slovenia

- Climate of Slovenia
- Renewable energy in Slovenia
- Geology of Slovenia
- Protected areas of Slovenia
  - National parks of Slovenia
- Wildlife of Slovenia
  - Fauna of Slovenia
    - Birds of Slovenia
    - Mammals of Slovenia

==== Natural geographic features of Slovenia ====
- Islands of Slovenia
- Lakes of Slovenia
- Mountains of Slovenia
- Rivers of Slovenia
- World Heritage Sites in Slovenia

=== Regions of Slovenia ===
Statistical regions of Slovenia

==== Ecoregions of Slovenia ====
List of ecoregions in Slovenia

- Ecoregions in Slovenia

==== Administrative divisions of Slovenia ====
Administrative divisions of Slovenia

- Capital of Slovenia: Ljubljana
- List of cities in Slovenia

=== Demography of Slovenia ===
Demographics of Slovenia

== Politics of Slovenia ==
Politics of Slovenia

- Form of government: parliamentary representative democratic republic
- Capital of Slovenia: Ljubljana
- Elections in Slovenia
- Political parties in Slovenia

=== Branches of the government of Slovenia ===
==== Executive branch of the government of Slovenia ====
- Head of state: President of Slovenia
- Head of government: Prime Minister of Slovenia
- Government of Slovenia

==== Legislative branch of the government of Slovenia ====
- Parliament of Slovenia (incompletely bicameral)
  - National Council
  - National Assembly

==== Judicial branch of the government of Slovenia ====
Judiciary of Slovenia

- Supreme Court of Slovenia

=== Foreign relations of Slovenia ===
Foreign relations of Slovenia

- Diplomatic missions in Slovenia
- Diplomatic missions of Slovenia

==== International organization membership ====
The Republic of Slovenia is a member of:

- Australia Group
- Bank for International Settlements (BIS)
- Central European Initiative (CEI)
- Confederation of European Paper Industries (CEPI)
- Council of Europe (CE)
- Economic and Monetary Union (EMU)
- Euro-Atlantic Partnership Council (EAPC)
- European Bank for Reconstruction and Development (EBRD)
- European Investment Bank (EIB)
- European Union (EU)
- Food and Agriculture Organization (FAO)
- Inter-American Development Bank (IADB)
- International Atomic Energy Agency (IAEA)
- International Bank for Reconstruction and Development (IBRD)
- International Chamber of Commerce (ICC)
- International Civil Aviation Organization (ICAO)
- International Criminal Court (ICCt)
- International Criminal Police Organization (Interpol)
- International Development Association (IDA)
- International Federation of Red Cross and Red Crescent Societies (IFRCS)
- International Finance Corporation (IFC)
- International Hydrographic Organization (IHO)
- International Labour Organization (ILO)
- International Maritime Organization (IMO)
- International Monetary Fund (IMF)
- International Olympic Committee (IOC)
- International Organization for Migration (IOM)
- International Organization for Standardization (ISO)
- International Red Cross and Red Crescent Movement (ICRM)
- International Telecommunication Union (ITU)
- Inter-Parliamentary Union (IPU)
- Multilateral Investment Guarantee Agency (MIGA)
- Nonaligned Movement (NAM) (guest)
- North Atlantic Treaty Organization (NATO)
- Nuclear Suppliers Group (NSG)
- Organisation internationale de la Francophonie (OIF) (observer)
- Organisation for Economic Co-operation and Development (OECD)
- Organization for Security and Cooperation in Europe (OSCE)
- Organisation for the Prohibition of Chemical Weapons (OPCW)
- Organization of American States (OAS) (observer)
- Permanent Court of Arbitration (PCA)
- Schengen Convention
- Southeast European Cooperative Initiative (SECI)
- United Nations (UN)
- United Nations Conference on Trade and Development (UNCTAD)
- United Nations Educational, Scientific, and Cultural Organization (UNESCO)
- United Nations Industrial Development Organization (UNIDO)
- United Nations Interim Force in Lebanon (UNIFIL)
- United Nations Truce Supervision Organization (UNTSO)
- Universal Postal Union (UPU)
- Western European Union (WEU) (associate partner)
- World Customs Organization (WCO)
- World Federation of Trade Unions (WFTU)
- World Health Organization (WHO)
- World Intellectual Property Organization (WIPO)
- World Meteorological Organization (WMO)
- World Tourism Organization (UNWTO)
- World Trade Organization (WTO)
- Zangger Committee (ZC)

=== Law and order in Slovenia ===
- Capital punishment in Slovenia
- Constitution of Slovenia
- Crime in Slovenia
- Human rights in Slovenia
  - LGBT rights in Slovenia
  - Freedom of religion in Slovenia
- Law enforcement in Slovenia

=== Military of Slovenia ===
Military of Slovenia

- Command
  - Commander-in-chief: President of Slovenia
    - Ministry of Defence of Slovenia
- Forces
  - Army of Slovenia
  - Navy of Slovenia
  - Air Force of Slovenia
- Military history of Slovenia
- Slovenian military ranks

=== Local government in Slovenia ===
Local government in Slovenia

== History of Slovenia ==
- Military history of Slovenia

== Culture of Slovenia ==
Culture of Slovenia

- Architecture of Slovenia
- Cuisine of Slovenia
- Languages of Slovenia
- Media in Slovenia
- National symbols of Slovenia
  - Coat of arms of Slovenia
  - Flag of Slovenia
  - National anthem of Slovenia: Zdravljica
- People of Slovenia
- Prostitution in Slovenia
- Public holidays in Slovenia
- Religion in Slovenia
  - Buddhism in Slovenia
  - Christianity in Slovenia
    - Roman Catholicism in Slovenia
  - Hinduism in Slovenia
  - Islam in Slovenia
  - Judaism in Slovenia
- World Heritage Sites in Slovenia

=== Art in Slovenia ===
- Art of Slovenia
- Cinema of Slovenia
- Literature of Slovenia
- Music of Slovenia
- Radio in Slovenia
- Television in Slovenia
- Theatre in Slovenia

=== Sports in Slovenia ===
Sports in Slovenia

- Football in Slovenia
- Slovenia at the Olympics
- Slovenian Sportsman of the year

== Economy and infrastructure of Slovenia ==
Economy of Slovenia

- Economic rank, by nominal GDP (2007): 67th (sixty-seventh)
- Agriculture in Slovenia
- Banking in Slovenia
  - National Bank of Slovenia
- Communications in Slovenia
  - Internet in Slovenia
- Companies of Slovenia
- Currency of Slovenia: Euro (see also: Euro topics)
  - ISO 4217: EUR
- Energy in Slovenia
- Health care in Slovenia
- Tourism in Slovenia
- Transport in Slovenia
  - Airports in Slovenia
  - Rail transport in Slovenia
  - Roads in Slovenia
    - Motorways in Slovenia

== Education in Slovenia ==
Education in Slovenia

- Universities in Slovenia
- The National Education Institute of the Republic of Slovenia

== See also ==
- List of international rankings
- Member state of the European Union
- Member state of the North Atlantic Treaty Organization
- Member state of the United Nations
- Outline of Europe
- Outline of geography
