= Fauna of Slovenia =

Native animals of Slovenia

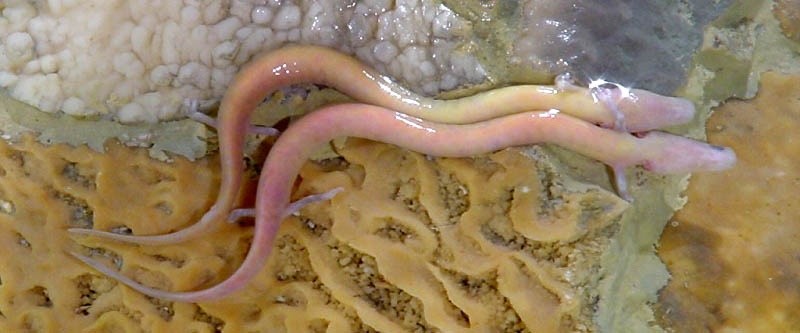
Olm

Slovenia is home to three native horse breeds—the Lipizzaner, the Posavski horse, and the Slovenian cold-blooded horse—and four native sheep breeds: the Bovec sheep, the Istrian "pramenka," the Bela krajina "pramenka," and the Jezersko-Solčava sheep. Additionally, several other species have a single indigenous breed in Slovenia, including the Karst Shepherd dog, "cika" cattle, the Drežnica goat, the Krškopolje pig, the Štajerska hen, the Soča trout, and the Carniolan bee.

Fauna of Slovenia includes:

- List of birds of Slovenia
- List of Lepidoptera of Slovenia
- List of mammals of Slovenia
- List of Odonata species of Slovenia

== See also ==
- Outline of Slovenia
- Category:Fauna of Slovenia
