= Education in Slovenia =

Graduates of Alma Mater Europaea, Maribor, Slovenia throwing hats in the air at a graduation ceremony.

Education in Slovenia from primary to secondary schooling is regulated by the National Education Institute of the Republic of Slovenia (ZRSŠ), whose scope includes education programmes, delivery and development.

== Primary school ==
Children first enter primary schooling at the age of 5 if born after 1 September and the age of 6 if born before and finish at the age of 14 or 15. Each group of children born in the same year forms one grade or class in primary school which lasts until the end of primary school. Each grade or year is divided into two terms. Once or twice per term, children have holidays: autumn, Christmas, winter and May first holidays; each holiday is approximately one week long. At summer time, school ends on 24 June, The school holidays are Summer (2 months), Autumn holidays, Christmas and New years holidays, and First May holidays. While National Days are also school free. The next school year starts on the 1st of September.

=== First period ===
Children begin their schooling with the First period. From the first to the fifth grade children stay in one classroom, have one class or form and one teacher. In some schools, sports, art and music are taught by separate teachers or are supervised by an appropriate teacher. In the beginning of the first year a supervisory teacher helps the master teacher lead the younger students into the new system. Students start with reading, writing and counting. Children are taught their native language (Slovenian, Hungarian or Italian, depending on the area of their schooling), mathematics, natural and sociological sciences, music, physical education and art. In the first grade they begin to learn their first foreign language, which is usually English. Until the fourth grade, children receive descriptive marks, and thereafter examinations are marked with number grades.

=== Second period ===
The Second period of primary schooling begins with the sixth grade when children are assigned to new teachers. A master teacher teaches one or two subjects, all others are taught by other specialized teachers. The main subjects are math, Slovenian (as native language), one foreign language (English, Italian or Hungarian), PE, music, geography, history and art. Later in this period, physics, chemistry, biology, ethics and craft are added to the curriculum. In the seventh, eighth and ninth grade they must choose at least two hours of elective subjects, and may choose a non-compulsory third hour. With around forty to choose from, the subjects offered include foreign languages, astronomy, fine art, philosophy, computer science etc.

=== Marks and grades ===
The grades are the same as in other countries that belonged to Yugoslavia before 1991. In primary school marks start with 1 (insufficient) and is the only failure mark. The second one is 2 (sufficient), the next is 3 (good), then 4 (very good) and the best is 5 (excellent).

== National Education Institute of the Republic of Slovenia ==
The National Education Institute of the Republic of Slovenia (Zavod Republike Slovenije za Šolstvo - ZRSŠ) is the main public organisation in Slovenia which encourages development in the field of education in Slovenia up to pre-university – covering all kindergartens, elementary schools, secondary schools, music schools, and student boarding schools.

== Tertiary education ==
High school graduates can enter one of the institutions of tertiary education (university, faculty art academy or professional college). Currently there are three public universities in Slovenia: the University of Ljubljana, the University of Maribor and the University of Primorska. Other institutions of tertiary education in Slovenia include the University of Nova Gorica, the Euro-Mediterranean University of Slovenia and others. According to the ARWU rating, the University of Ljubljana is among the top 500 universities in the world.
