= Crime in Slovenia =

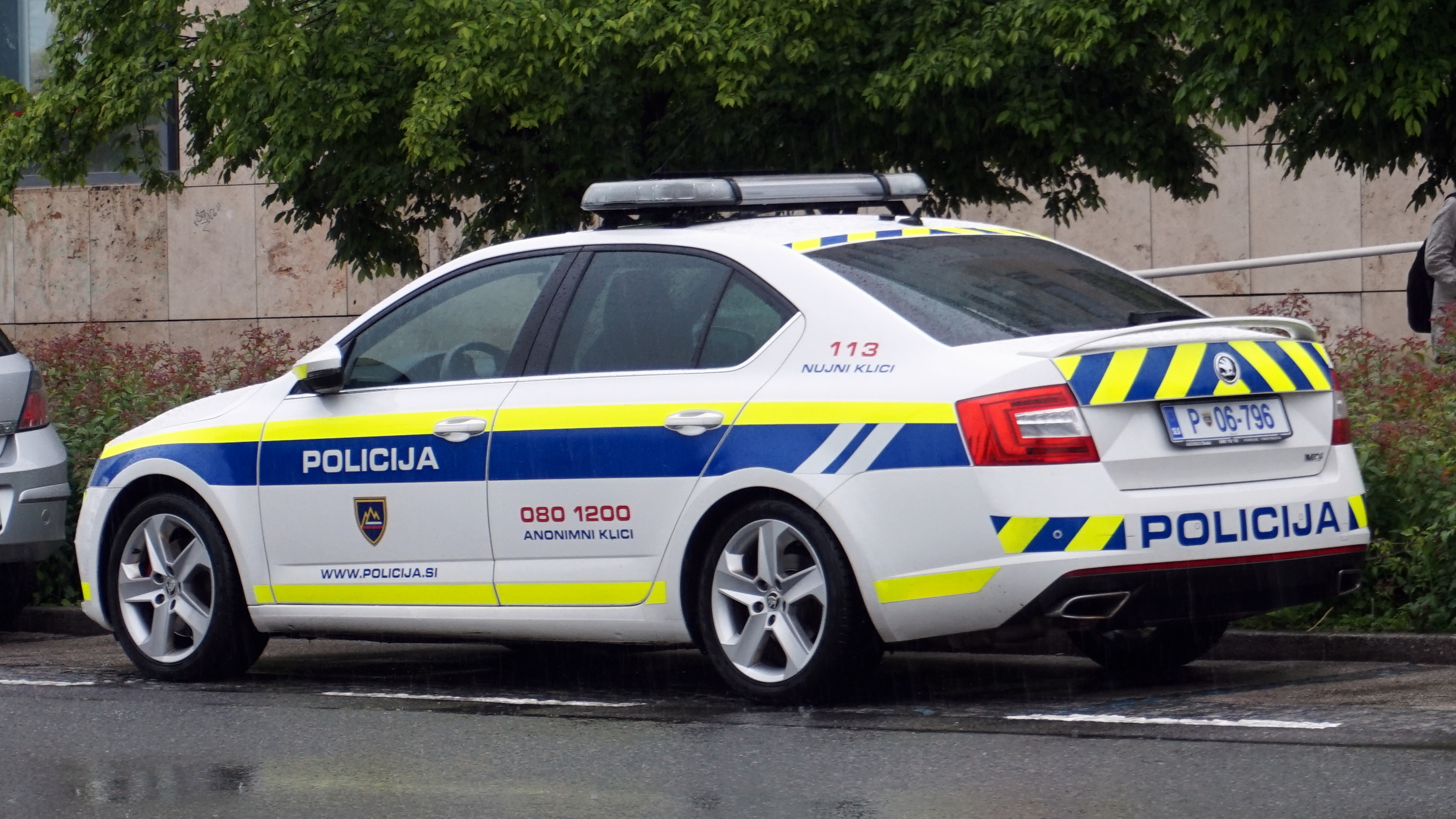
A police car in Slovenia in 2016.

Slovenia is a Central European country with a history of relatively low crime. Slovenia has an assortment of police forces, with the Slovenian National Police Force the primary law enforcement agency.

== Law enforcement ==
The Slovenian National Police Force is responsible for criminal justice in Slovenia as overseen by the Ministry of the Interior. As of 2012, the Slovenian police force consists of approximately 9,000 officers. Between 2010 and 2019, police addressed an average of 75,510 criminal offenses annually, with the total number of annual crimes decreasing later in the decade. The amount of reported criminal activity decreased during the COVID-19 pandemic in 2020. Prosecutors are responsible for initiating criminal proceedings in most cases, though victims may do so in some circumstances. Prosecution, defense, and trial are conducted separately during criminal proceedings. As of 2018, there were 1,396 people in prison in Slovenia, making up 79.98 per 100,000 of the adult population.

The study of criminology emerged as a scientific field in Slovenia during the early-20th century, pioneered by Aleksander Maklecov. The government provided for the publishing of the Journal of Criminal Investigation and Criminology in 1950 and the Institute of Criminology at the Faculty of Law was established in the University of Ljubljana in 1954. Most criminology projects in Slovenia are funded by the Slovenian Research Agency.

== Violent crime ==
In 2017, 324 firearms and other weapons were seized by law enforcement. In 2018, there were 10 acts of intentional homicide. This amounts to 0.5 instances of homicide per 100,000 people, compared to a world average of 5.8 per 100,000. In the same year, there were 1,544 acts of assault resulting in serious bodily injury, 6 instances of kidnapping, and 264 instances of violent robbery per 100,000 people. In 2017, there were 427 instances of sexual violence per 100,000 people. 25 victims of human trafficking were detected in 2017.

== Property crime ==
Crime in Slovenia caused an estimated 510 million euros of damage in 2017. In 2018, there were 3,907 instances of fraud, 8,388 instances of burglary, and 19,613 instances of theft per 100,000 people.

== Organized crime ==
Turbulence during the fall of Communism resulted in an increase of organized crime in Slovenia. The government of Slovenia operates in accordance with the practices of Europol when addressing organized crime. 1.5% of crimes investigated in 2019 were classified as organized crime.

== See also ==
- Corruption in Slovenia
- Judiciary of Slovenia
- Politics of Slovenia
- Violence against LGBT people in Slovenia
