= Freedom of religion in Slovenia =

Freedom of religion in Slovenia refers to the extent to which people in Slovenia are freely able to practice their religious beliefs, taking into account both government policies and societal attitudes toward religious groups.

Slovenia's laws guarantee the freedom of religion and establish a separation between church and state, as well as prohibiting religious discrimination and religious hatred. Religious groups may easily register with the government in order to receive some privileges, largely consisting of various forms of monetary compensation. Slovenia's laws prohibit circumcision for nonmedical reasons and animal slaughtering practices that are necessary for meat to be considered kosher or halal. Members of the Jewish and Muslim communities observe these practices outside of the country (importing meat, and traveling to neighboring countries for religious circumcision) without obstruction from Slovenia's government.

During the medieval and early modern periods, modern Slovenia was part of the Holy Roman and later Austro-Hungarian empires, and thus had a strict state religion of Catholicism. Religious laws were slowly liberalized starting in the late 18th century, although a formal separation of church and state was not implemented until the establishment of the Socialist Federal Republic of Yugoslavia in 1946. The Yugoslavian government promoted atheism and expropriated the Catholic Church, but otherwise engaged in minimal religious repression in Slovenia. Following the collapse of Yugoslavia and the establishment of an independent Slovenia, Slovenia continues to use religious freedom laws lightly adapted from previous Yugoslavian legislation.

In 2023, the country was scored 4 out of 4 for religious freedom.

== Demographics ==
According to the 2002 census, as of 2017 the most recent available, 57.8 percent of the population is Roman Catholic, 2.4 percent Muslim, 2.3 percent Serbian Orthodox, 0.9 percent “other Christian,” and 10.1 percent atheist. In addition, 23 percent identified as “other” or did not declare a religion, 3.5 percent declared themselves “unaffiliated,” and 10.1 percent selected no religion. The Jewish community estimates its size at approximately 300 individuals (less than 1 percent of the total population). The Orthodox and Muslim communities include a large number of immigrants from Serbia and Bosnia and Herzegovina, respectively.

== History ==
Prior to the 20th century, the territories corresponding to modern Slovenia were part of the Holy Roman Empire and later Austria-Hungary. As such, their state religion was Roman Catholicism for this period. In the late 15th and early 16th centuries, Jews were expelled from many Slovene territories. Jews were invited back into Inner Austria in 1709. Beginning in the late 18th century, Austria-Hungary adopted reforms that granted some religious freedom, first to Orthodox and Protestant Christians, and later to Jews as well. The 19th century saw a slow liberalization of religious laws, with Christian minority denominations inching towards equal footing with the Catholic Church, although Catholicism remained the state religion. This state of affairs was preserved in Slovenia upon its accession to the Kingdom of Serbs, Croats and Slovenes, although Jews, Muslims, and minority Christian denominations gained recognition from the state following this transition. Atheists, however, were considered second class citizens, and the Catholic Church played a significant role in circumscribing intellectual life in Slovenia. During World War II, Slovenia was occupied by various Axis powers and almost the entirety of its Jewish population was killed or fled.

For much of the second half of the 20th century, Slovenia was part of Yugoslavia, which established a secular state, and did not engage in anti-religious campaigns to the extent of other countries in the Eastern Bloc. Even as compared to other republics within Yugoslavia, Slovenians enjoyed relative religious freedom. The Roman Catholic Church had much of its property confiscated and many priests were persecuted by the Yugoslavian government, although this was largely due to the Church's collaboration with Axis forces during World War II. Nevertheless, religious instruction was removed from school curricula in 1952, and atheism was promoted. Beginning in the 1960s, Yugoslavia's attitudes toward religion thawed further, although religious belief was considered incompatible with membership in the League of Communists of Yugoslavia until the 1980s.

According to surveys conducted in the 1990s, only 11% of Slovenes felt that they had been discriminated against due to their religiosity at any point in their lives; 18% reported that they knew friends or family that had been subject to such discrimination.

Unlike the other regions of Yugoslavia, Slovenia was much more ethnically and religiously homogeneous, and consequently avoided being affected by sectarian civil war following the dissolution of Yugoslavia.

== Legal framework ==
The constitution guarantees the freedom of religion and the right of individuals to express their beliefs in public and private. It declares that all religious communities shall have equal rights and provides for the separation of religion and state. The constitution also prohibits the incitement of religious discrimination and inflammation of religious hatred and intolerance. The constitution recognizes the right of conscientious objection to military service for religious reasons.

=== Anti-discrimination laws ===
The penal code's definition of hate crimes includes publicly provoking religious hatred and diminishing the significance of the Holocaust. Punishment for these offenses is imprisonment of up to two years, or, if the crime involves coercion or endangerment of security – defined as a serious threat to life and limb, desecration, or damage to property – imprisonment for up to five years. If an official abusing the power of his or her position commits these offenses, he or she may be subject to imprisonment of up to five years. Members of groups that engage in these activities in an organized and premeditated fashion – hate groups, according to the law – may also receive a punishment of up to five years in prison.

=== Government rulings limiting religious practices ===
The law requires that animals be stunned prior to slaughter, which effectively bans halal or kosher butchers from operating in Slovenia. As of 2017, this law has been under review since 2014 following complaints from Muslim and Jewish organizations.

The Ombudsman for the Protection of Human Rights has issued an opinion that, based on the constitution and the law, “circumcision for nonmedical reasons is not permissible and constitutes unlawful interference with the child’s body, thereby violating his rights.” The ombudsman has stated that additional legislation is necessary to legalize and regulate circumcision for religious reasons, with the actual status of circumcision remaining unclear. The procedure is consequently inconsistently available at hospitals. Some members of the Muslim and Jewish communities have chosen to undergo the procedure in the neighboring country of Austria, and have not faced any legal restrictions on doing so.

=== Religious group registration ===
The law requires churches and other religious communities to register with the government to obtain status as legal entities, but it does not restrict the religious activities of unregistered religious groups. The rights of registered religious groups as recognized legal entities include eligibility for rebates on value-added taxes, government cofinancing of social security for clergy, and authorization to request social benefits for their religious workers. To register legally with the government, a religious group must submit an application to the Ministry of Culture providing proof that it has at least 10 adult members who are citizens or permanent residents; the name of the group in Latin letters, which must be clearly distinguishable from the names of other religious groups; the group's address in the country; and a copy of its official seal to be used in legal transactions. It must also pay an administrative tax of 22.60 euros ($27). The group must also provide the names of the group's representatives in the country, a description of the foundations of the group's religious beliefs, and a copy of its organizational act. If a group wishes to apply for government cosponsorship of social security for clergy members, it must show it has at least 1,000 members for every clergy member. It has been noted that these requirements for registration are even stricter than the ones enacted by the Socialist government in the 1970s. If these registration requirements were to be applied to religious organizations already recognized by the government at the time of the new law's passing in 2007, more than half of the existing religious organizations in Slovenia would not meet the criteria.

The government may only refuse the registration of a religious group if the group does not provide the required application materials in full or if the Ministry of Culture determines the group is a hate group – an organization engaging in hate crimes as defined by the penal code.

By law the Ministry of Culture's Office for Religious Communities monitors and maintains records on registered religious communities and provides legal expertise and assistance to religious organizations. The Ministry of Culture establishes and manages the procedures for registration, issues documents related to the legal status of registered communities, distributes funds allocated in the government's budget for religious activities, organizes discussions and gatherings of religious communities to address religious freedom concerns, and provides information to religious groups about the legal provisions and regulations related to their activities.

== Attitudes toward religious minorities ==
The Muslim minority in Slovenia experiences prejudice and some discrimination from broader Slovenian society, although they are still largely tolerated and are viewed as sharing a South Slavic heritage and identity with the Christian majority. The government of Slovenia has been described as "disinterested" in issues faced by religious minorities, and has been slow to act to resolve such issues, such as taking decades to approve the construction of a mosque in Ljubljana.

According to a 2019 study by the European Commission, 33 percent of Slovenians believe religious discrimination to be widespread, compared with 62 percent who believe that it is rare. 81 percent of the population said that they would be comfortable with a head of state that did not belong to the country's majority religion. As of 2019, there have been instances of anti-Muslim speech both on social media and in conventional media platforms. Muslim community leaders, NGOs, and government officials reported in 2019 that anti-Muslim sentiment appeared to be declining since the prior year, with rhetoric adopting an increasingly anti-migrant tone instead of an explicitly anti-Muslim tone. Jewish community leaders in 2019 were divided as to whether Slovenia was generally a safe place for Jews.

== Education ==
The government requires all public schools to include education on world religions in their curricula, with instruction provided by school teachers. The government allows churches and religious groups to provide religious education in their faiths in both private and public schools and preschools, on a voluntary basis outside of school hours, but the inclusion of denominational instruction or religious rites practiced with the intent of instructing children to practice the religion is forbidden in schools.

== See also ==
- Religion in Slovenia
