= List of protected areas of Slovenia =

Protected areas of Slovenia include one national park (Slovene: narodni park), three regional parks (regijski park), several natural parks (krajinski park), and hundreds of natural monuments (naravni spomenik) and monuments of designed nature (spomenik oblikovane narave). They cover about 12.5% of the Slovenian territory. Under the Wild Birds Directive, 26 sites totalling roughly 25% of the nation's land are "Special Protected Areas"; the Natura 2000 proposal would increase the totals to 260 sites and 32% of national territory.

== National parks ==
- Triglav National Park

== Regional parks ==
- Inner Carniola Regional Park
- Kozje Park
- Škocjan Caves Regional Park
- Pohorje Regional Park

== Natural parks ==
- Beka Natural Park
- Boč Natural Park
- Drava Natural Park
- Golte Natural Park
- Snežnik Castle Complex Natural Park
- Jareninski Dol Natural Park
- Jeruzalem–Ormož Hills Natural Park
- Kamenščak–Hrastovec Natural Park
- Kolpa Natural Park
- Kum Natural Park
- Lahinja Natural Park
- Ljubljana Marsh Natural Park
- Ljutomer Pond and Jeruzalem Hills Natural Park
- Logar Valley Natural Park
- Lake Maribor Natural Park
- Mašun Natural Park
- Mrzlica Natural Park
- Nanos Natural Park
- Negova and Lake Negova Natural Park
- Planina Plain Natural Park
- Polhov Gradec Hills Natural Park
- Ponikve Karst Natural Park
- Porezen–Davča Natural Park
- Rače Ponds–Požeg Natural Park
- Račna Karst Field Natural Park
- Rak Škocjan Natural Park
- Roban Cirque Natural Park
- Sečovelje Salina Natural Park
- Municipality of Domžale Revolutionary Traditions Memorial Park
- Štanjel Natural Park
- Štatenberg Natural Park
- Strunjan Natural Park
- Šturmovci Natural Park
- Tivoli–Rožnik Hill–Šiška Hill Natural Park
- Topla Natural Park
- Trnovo Forest Natural Park
- Udin Forest Natural Park (Slovene: Udin boršt)
- Moravci Drillholes and Baths Natural Park
- Žabljek Natural Park
- Zajčja Dobrava Natural Park
- Zelenci Natural Park
- Zgornja Idrijca Natural Park

== Natural monuments ==
On 1 January 2012, there were 1276 natural monuments in Slovenia.

== Natura 2000 areas ==
- Banjšice
- Breginj Stol–Planja
- Lake Cerknica
- Drava
- Dravinja Valley
- Goričko
- Jelovica
- Julian Alps
- Kamnik–Savinja Alps and the Eastern Karawanks
- Karawanks
- Kočevje Region–Kolpa
- Kozje Region–Dobrava–Jovsi
- Krakovo Forest–Šentjernej Plain
- Karst Plateau
- Ljubljana Marsh
- Mur River
- Nanoščica–River Basin
- Planina Karst Field
- Pohorje
- Sava Hills–Mountain Walls
- Sečovlje Saltpans
- Škocjan Inlet
- Slovene Hills–Lowlands
- Snežnik–Pivka
- Trnovo Forest
- Trnovo Forest–Southern Outhskirt and Nanos
