= Corruption in Slovenia =

Corruption in Slovenia is examined on this page.

== Extent ==
Transparency International's 2021 Global Corruption Barometer surveyed Slovenians and asked if most or all of the people in specific public, business, and NGO institutions were corrupt. The institution pointed out by the largest percentage of survey respondents (39%) as corrupt was the prime minister, followed by national government officials (28% of survey respondents), members of parliament (24%), and bankers (24%). In the same survey, 4% of Slovenians reported that they had paid a bribe to a public servant in the last 12 months, and 51% thought that corruption had increased during that period.

In January 2013, thousands of Slovenians joined the Commission for the Prevention of Corruption and took to the streets, demanding the resignation of Prime Minister Janez Janša and opposition leader Zoran Janković because both had been accused of failing to properly declare their personal assets. The Commission accused both of “systemic, gross and repeated violations of the anti-corruption legislation”. The month after the protest, Janša was ousted in a no-confidence vote. In June 2013, Janša was convicted of corruption in connection with a 2006 defence contract and given a two-year prison sentence. The conviction was unanimously overturned by the Constitutional Court on 23 April 2015. However, Zoran Janković, continued his mandate as mayor of Ljubljana.

Slovenia has been stagnating in the field of corruption for at least 5 years. Major systemic measures are needed to lower the level of corruption in Slovenia.

== Areas ==
=== Public ===
On Transparency International's 2025 Corruption Perceptions Index, Slovenia scored 58 on a scale from 0 ("highly corrupt") to 100 ("very clean"). When ranked by score, Slovenia ranked 41st among the 182 countries in the Index, where the country ranked first is perceived to have the most honest public sector. For comparison with regional scores, the best score among Western European and European Union countries (Note: Austria, Belgium, Bulgaria, Croatia, Cyprus, Czechia, Denmark, Estonia, Finland, France, Germany, Greece, Hungary, Iceland, Ireland, Italy, Latvia, Lithuania, Luxembourg, Malta, Netherlands, Norway, Poland, Portugal, Romania, Slovakia, Slovenia, Spain, Sweden, Switzerland, and the United Kingdom.) was 89, the average score was 64 and the worst score was 40. For comparison with worldwide scores, the best score was 89 (ranked 1), the average score was 42, and the worst score was 9 (ranked 181, in a two-way tie).

=== Business ===
According to Transparency International's Global Corruption Barometer 2013, the private sector is scored 3.3 on a 5-point scale (1 being 'not at all corrupt' and 5 being 'extremely corrupt').

=== Police ===
Contemporary concerns about police corruption are largely reflected by public opinion, which demonstrate widespread consensus that corruption within all public sectors is a "very big problem" in Slovenia. The 2013 Special Eurobarometer on Corruption showed that 76% (the second highest percentage in the EU) of Slovenian participants believed there had been an increase in corruption in the last three years. Furthermore, public opinion suggests that police corruption in particular is a significant issue, which much concern over bribery, and abuse of power for personal gain amongst Slovenian police officers.

Initially, Slovenian legislation did not provide for corruption as a separate offence distinguished from other forms of crime. Corruption is not used as a legal term in Slovenia, instead, the legislation provides for each offence individually as a criminal act. The Prevention of Corruption Act, adopted in 2004, defines corruption as "ever trespassing of the obligated treatment of official or responsible subject in the private or public sector, as well as the treatment of subjects that are initiators of violators, or subjects that can benefit from the violations". Changes within the organisation of policing in Slovenia were brought about initially by the 1991 Constitution, in line with political changes towards a more democratic system with a greater sensitivity towards human rights. These changes, along with the birth of the Constitutional court to enforce these, brought about strict limitations on powers of police to search and seize, as well as more emphasis on the protection of privacy and fundamental rights in criminal proceedings. The judicial control over police powers was further strengthened in the Police Act of 1998, later reinforced by the New Organisation and Work of the Police Act 2013. These acts provide specifically for instances of police corruption. Additionally, the 2013 act allowed an individual to file a direct complaint against a police officer if they thought the act, or failure to act, of the officer violated human rights or fundamental freedoms.

Following the cases of Rehblock v Slovenia (2000) and Matko v Slovenia (2006), a department for the prosecution of officials with special authorisations was established, which removed any police involvement in the investigation of other officers suspected of committing criminal offences. Since this recent introduction, there has been increased investigation and action taken for police offenders. In 2011, the department conducted 80 investigations, out of which 19 police officers were dismissed as a result of the suspicion of them committing a criminal offence.

Lobnikar and Meško (2015) found that within a sample of 550 Slovenian police officers, 23.6% agreed that covering up a police DUI was 'not all that serious'. Additionally, 34% of respondents claimed that they would not report another police officer who had engaged in conduct such as receiving free meals, gifts from merchants, police DUI and verbal abuse. While this study demonstrated a trend in Slovenian police officers to ignore less serious forms of police corruption, there is agreement (59.1-75%) that police integrity within the Slovenian police work environment is generally high.

Within the wider context of the European Union, corruption continues to be an economic burden. Aside from the consequences within each member state, corruption reduces levels of investment, obstructs the fair operation of the Internal Market and has a negative impact on public finances. It is estimated that approximately 1% of the EU GDP is made up of economic costs incurred by corruption. Specifically, an estimated loss of between 1.5 and 2% of the Slovenian GDP is incurred as a result of corruption. Slovenia has administered substantial improvements to their legal framework to address the issue of police corruption among Central and Eastern European Member States. However, issues with the effective enforcement of these anti-corruption measures still remain, due to "weak control mechanisms" administered by the government. Lobnikar's and Meško's 2015 survey demonstrates a high level of police integrity strictly connected to the 'code of silence' in the police community. Therefore, anti-corruption strategies related to changing perceptions and moral beliefs about the seriousness of corruptive police conduct may be the most effective at improving Slovenia's anti-corruption enforcement.

== See also ==
- International Anti-Corruption Academy
- Group of States Against Corruption
- International Anti-Corruption Day
- ISO 37001 Anti-bribery management systems
- United Nations Convention against Corruption
- OECD Anti-Bribery Convention
- Transparency International
