= International rankings of Slovenia =

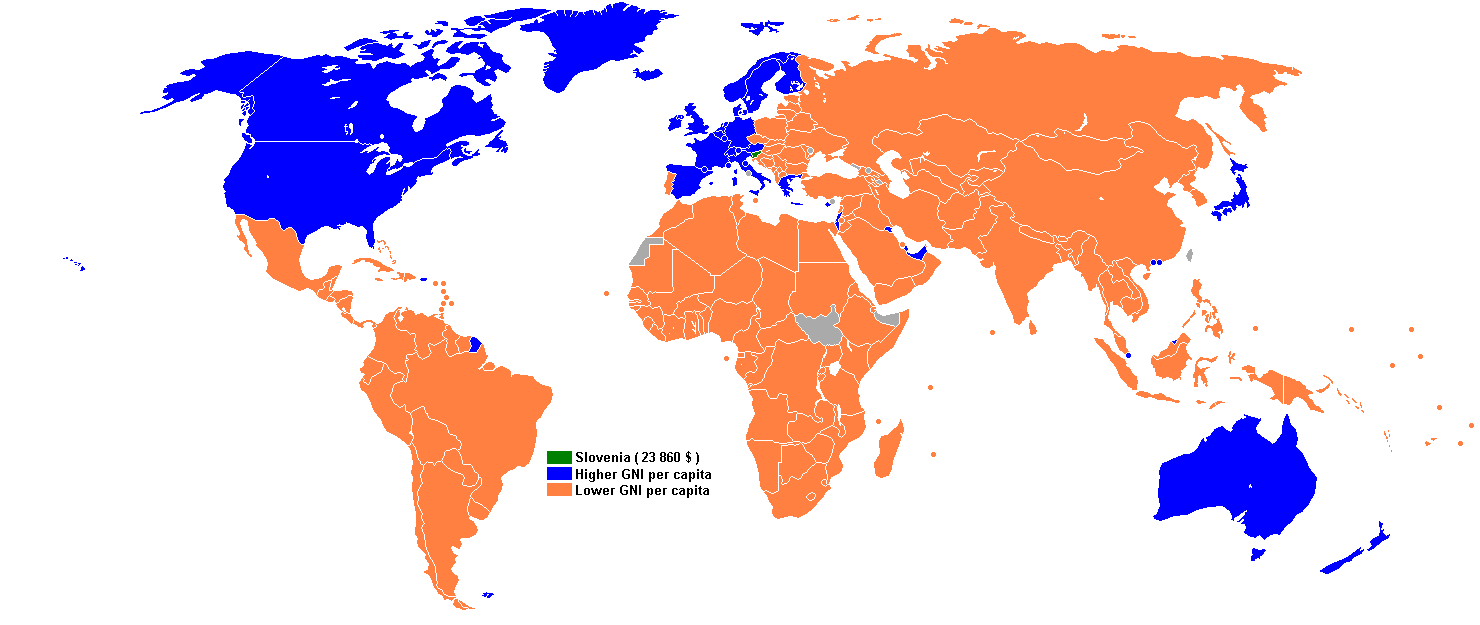
GNI per capita: Slovenia ($23 520) Higher GNI per capita compared to Slovenia Lower GNI per capita compared to Slovenia

The following are international rankings of Slovenia.

Organization	Survey	Ranking
Reporters Without Borders	Worldwide Press Freedom Index 2009	37 out of 175
The Heritage Foundation/The Wall Street Journal	Index of Economic Freedom 2010	61 out of 179
Transparency International	Corruption Perceptions Index 2009	27 out of 180
United Nations Development Programme	Human Development Index 2009	29 out of 182
Institute for Economics and Peace	Global Peace Index 2010	11 out of 149
Economist Intelligence Unit	2008 EIU e-readiness	29 out of 70
Privacy index	2005 Privacy index	5 out of 50
World Intellectual Property Organization	Global Innovation Index, 2026	35 out of 139
