= List of mammals of Slovenia =

There are 75 mammal species in Slovenia, of which seven are vulnerable and four are near threatened.

Icons which state each species' global IUCN status:
CR	Critically Endangered	In imminent risk of extinction in the wild
VU	Vulnerable	Facing a high risk of extinction in the wild
NT	Near Threatened	Doesn't meet any criteria that would categorise it as risking extinction but likely to in the future
LC	Least Concern	No current identifiable risks to this species

== Order: Rodentia (rodents) ==
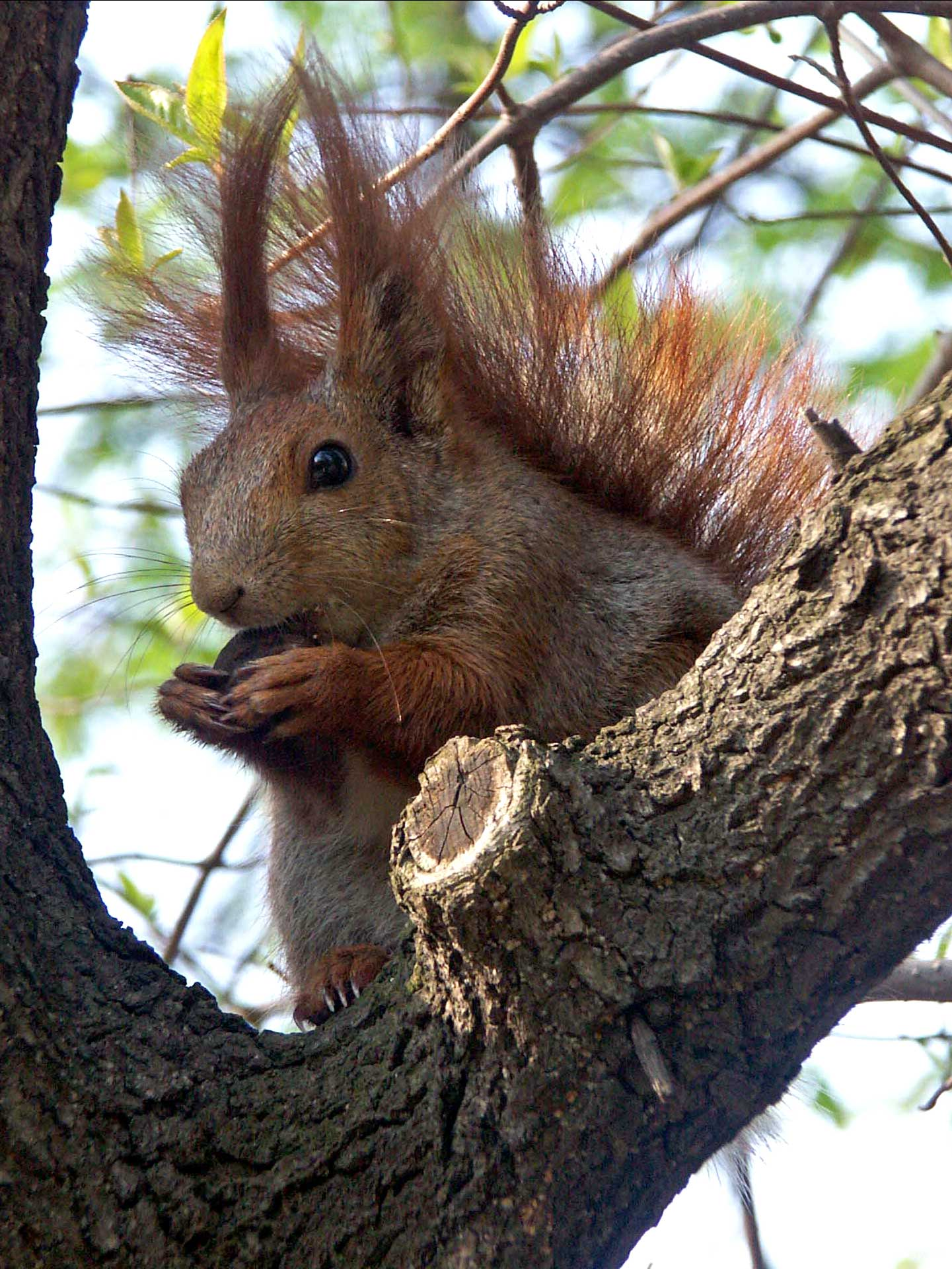
Red squirrel

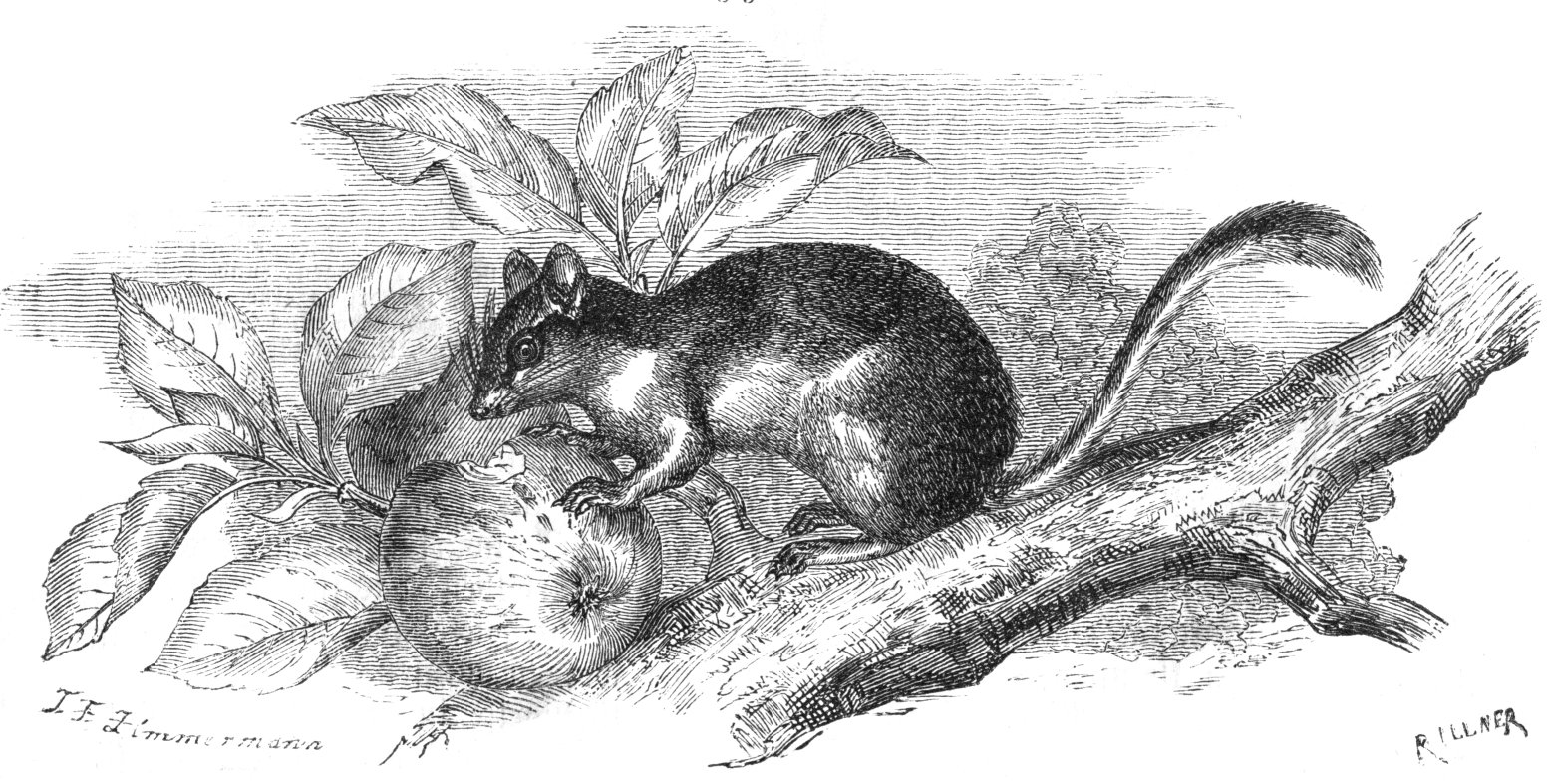
Garden dormouse

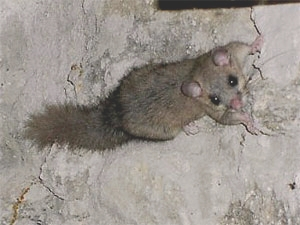
European edible dormouse

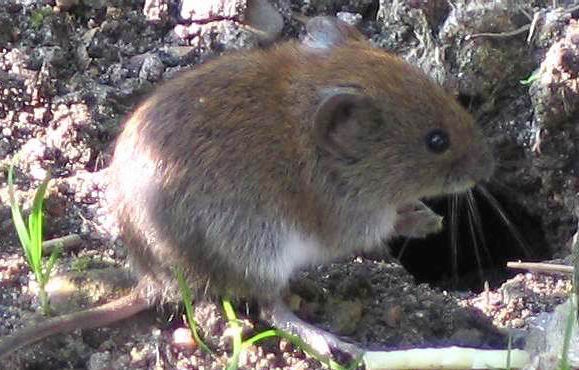
Bank vole

Rodents make up the largest order of mammals, with over 40% of mammalian species. They have two incisors in the upper and lower jaw which grow continually and must be kept short by gnawing. Most rodents are small though the capybara can weigh up to 45 kg (99 lb).

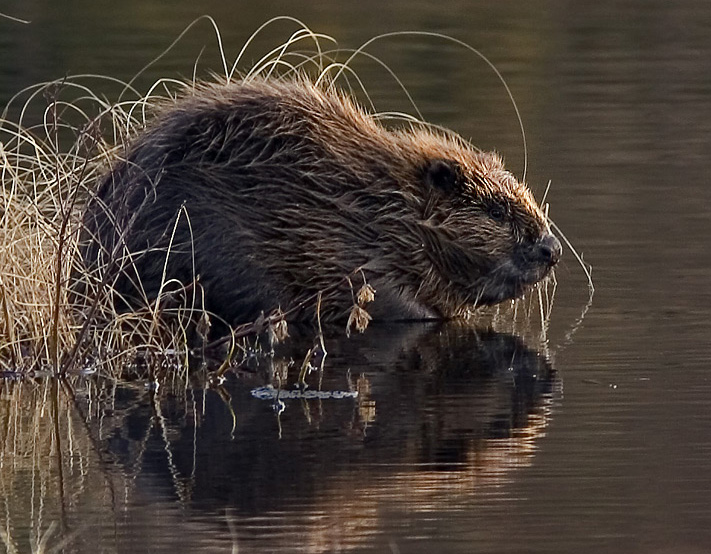
European beaver

- Suborder: Sciurognathi
  - Family: Castoridae (beavers)
    - Genus: Castor
      - Eurasian beaver, C. fiber LC
  - Family: Sciuridae (squirrels)
    - Subfamily: Sciurinae
      - Tribe: Sciurini
        - Genus: Sciurus
          - Red squirrel, Sciurus vulgaris NT
    - Subfamily: Xerinae
      - Tribe: Marmotini
        - Genus: Marmota
          - Alpine marmot, Marmota marmota LC
  - Family: Gliridae (dormice)
    - Subfamily: Leithiinae
      - Genus: Dryomys
        - Forest dormouse, Dryomys nitedula
      - Genus: Eliomys
        - Garden dormouse, Eliomys quercinus VU
      - Genus: Muscardinus
        - Hazel dormouse, Muscardinus avellanarius
    - Subfamily: Glirinae
      - Genus: Glis
        - European edible dormouse, Glis glis
  - Family: Cricetidae
    - Subfamily: Cricetinae
      - Genus: Cricetus
        - European hamster, C. cricetus CR
    - Subfamily: Arvicolinae
      - Genus: Arvicola
        - Water vole, Arvicola terrestris
      - Genus: Chionomys
        - Snow vole, Chionomys nivalis
      - Genus: Clethrionomys
        - Bank vole, Clethrionomys glareolus
      - Genus: Microtus
        - Field vole, Microtus agrestis
        - Common vole, Microtus arvalis
        - European pine vole, Microtus subterraneus
  - Family: Muridae (mice, rats, voles, gerbils, hamsters)
    - Subfamily: Murinae
      - Genus: Apodemus
        - Yellow-necked mouse, Apodemus flavicollis LC
        - Wood mouse, Apodemus sylvaticus LC
      - Genus: Micromys
        - Harvest mouse, Micromys minutus
      - Genus: Mus
        - Steppe mouse, Mus spicilegus

== Order: Lagomorpha (lagomorphs) ==
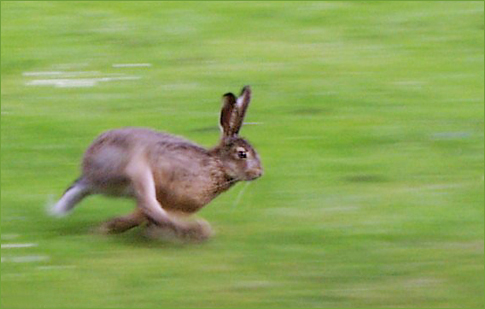
European hare

The lagomorphs comprise two families, Leporidae (hares and rabbits), and Ochotonidae (pikas). Though they can resemble rodents, and were classified as a superfamily in that order until the early 20th century, they have since been considered a separate order. They differ from rodents in a number of physical characteristics, such as having four incisors in the upper jaw rather than two.

- Family: Leporidae (rabbits, hares)
  - Genus: Lepus
    - European hare, L. europaeus LC
    - Mountain hare, L. timidus LC

== Order: Erinaceomorpha (hedgehogs and gymnures) ==
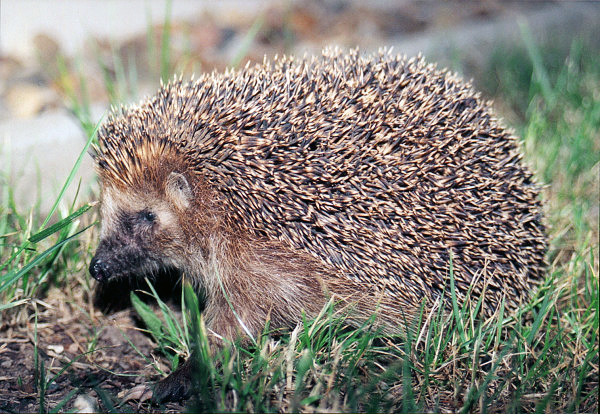
West European hedgehog

The order Erinaceomorpha contains a single family, Erinaceidae, which comprise the hedgehogs and gymnures. The hedgehogs are easily recognised by their spines while gymnures look more like large rats.

- Family: Erinaceidae (hedgehogs)
  - Subfamily: Erinaceinae
    - Genus: Erinaceus
      - Northern white-breasted hedgehog, E. roumanicus LC
      - West European hedgehog, E. europaeus LC

== Order: Soricomorpha (shrews, moles, and solenodons) ==
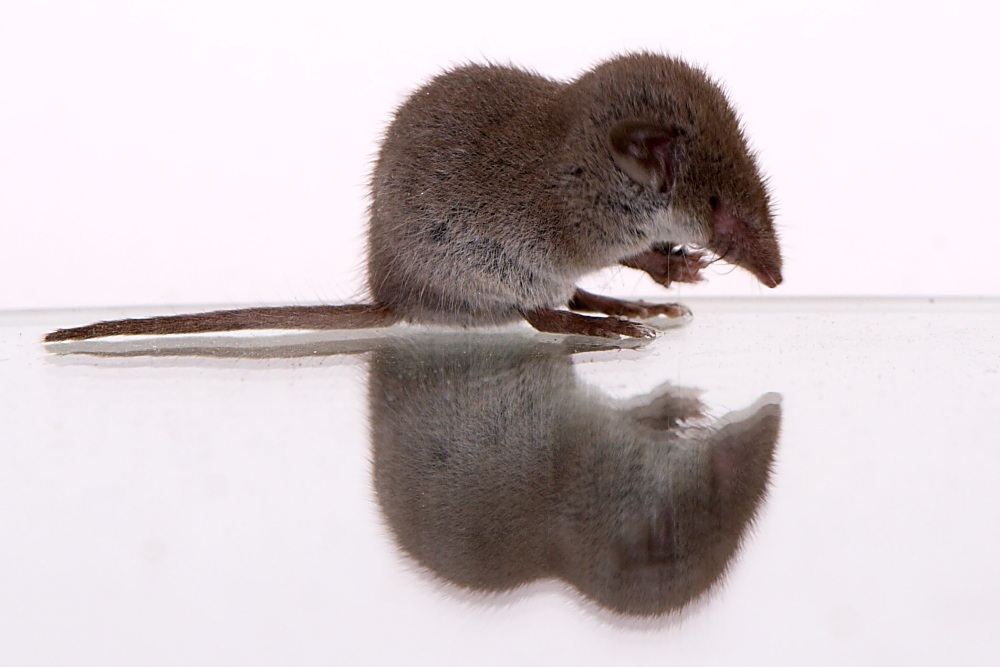
Lesser white-toothed shrew

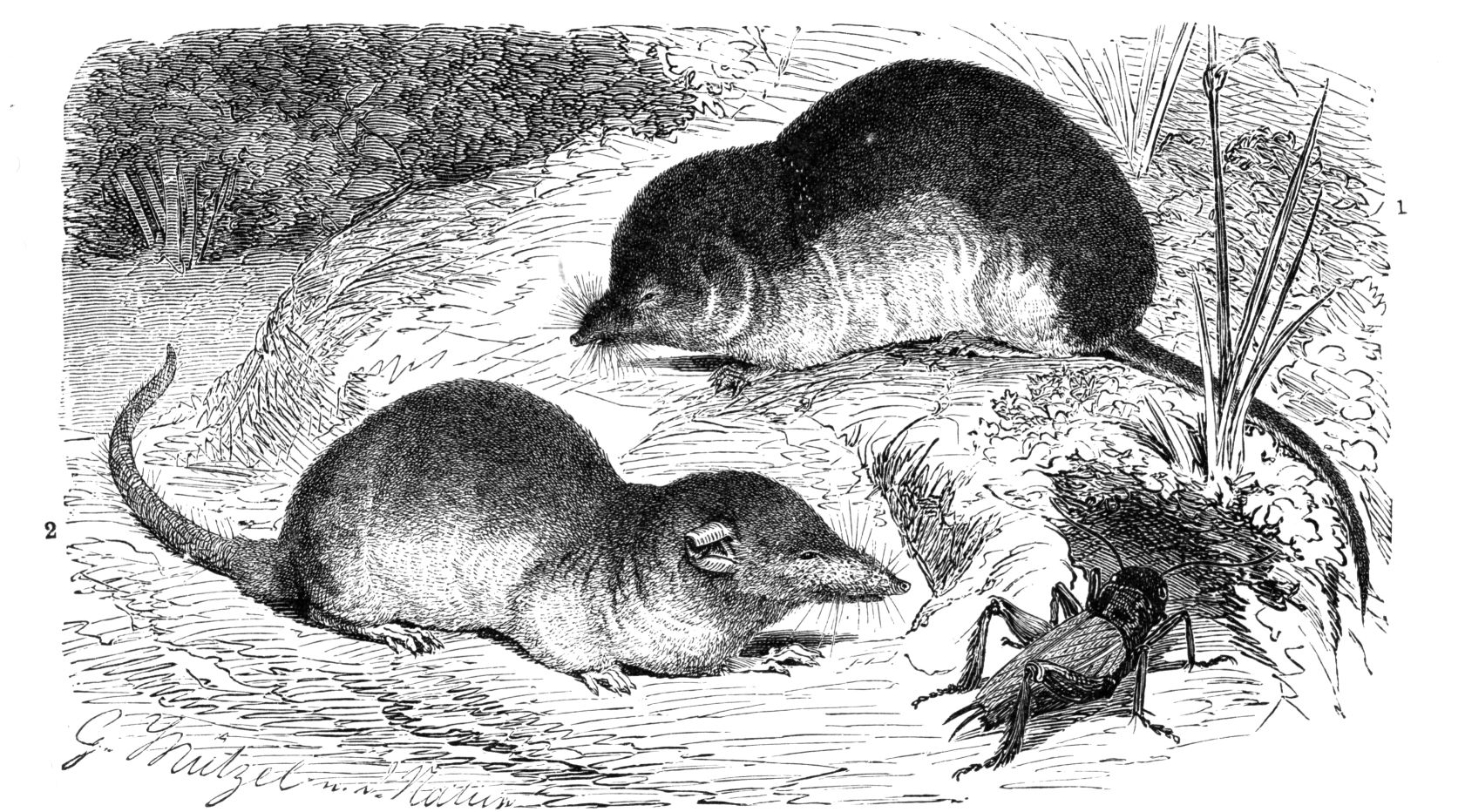
Common shrew

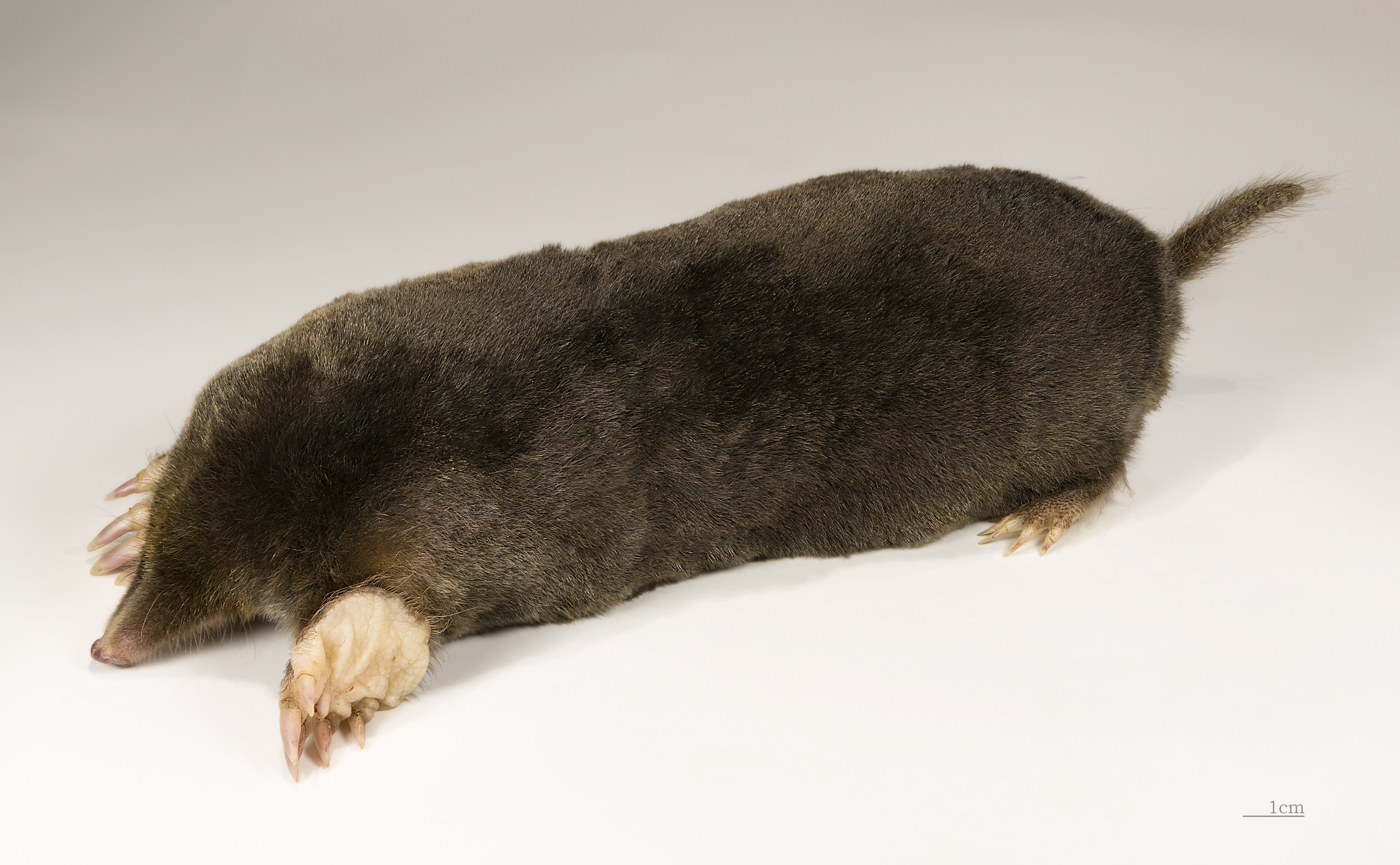
European mole

The "shrew-forms" are insectivorous mammals. The shrews and solenodons closely resemble mice while the moles are stout-bodied burrowers.

- Family: Soricidae (shrews)
  - Subfamily: Crocidurinae
    - Genus: Crocidura
      - Bicolored shrew, Crocidura leucodon
      - Lesser white-toothed shrew, Crocidura suaveolens
  - Subfamily: Soricinae
    - Tribe: Nectogalini
      - Genus: Neomys
        - Southern water shrew, Neomys anomalus
        - Eurasian water shrew, Neomys fodiens
    - Tribe: Soricini
      - Genus: Sorex
        - Alpine shrew, Sorex alpinus
        - Common shrew, Sorex araneus
- Family: Talpidae (moles)
  - Subfamily: Talpinae
    - Tribe: Talpini
      - Genus: Talpa
        - Mediterranean mole, Talpa caeca
        - European mole, Talpa europaea
        - Stankovic's mole, Talpa stankovici

== Order: Chiroptera (bats) ==
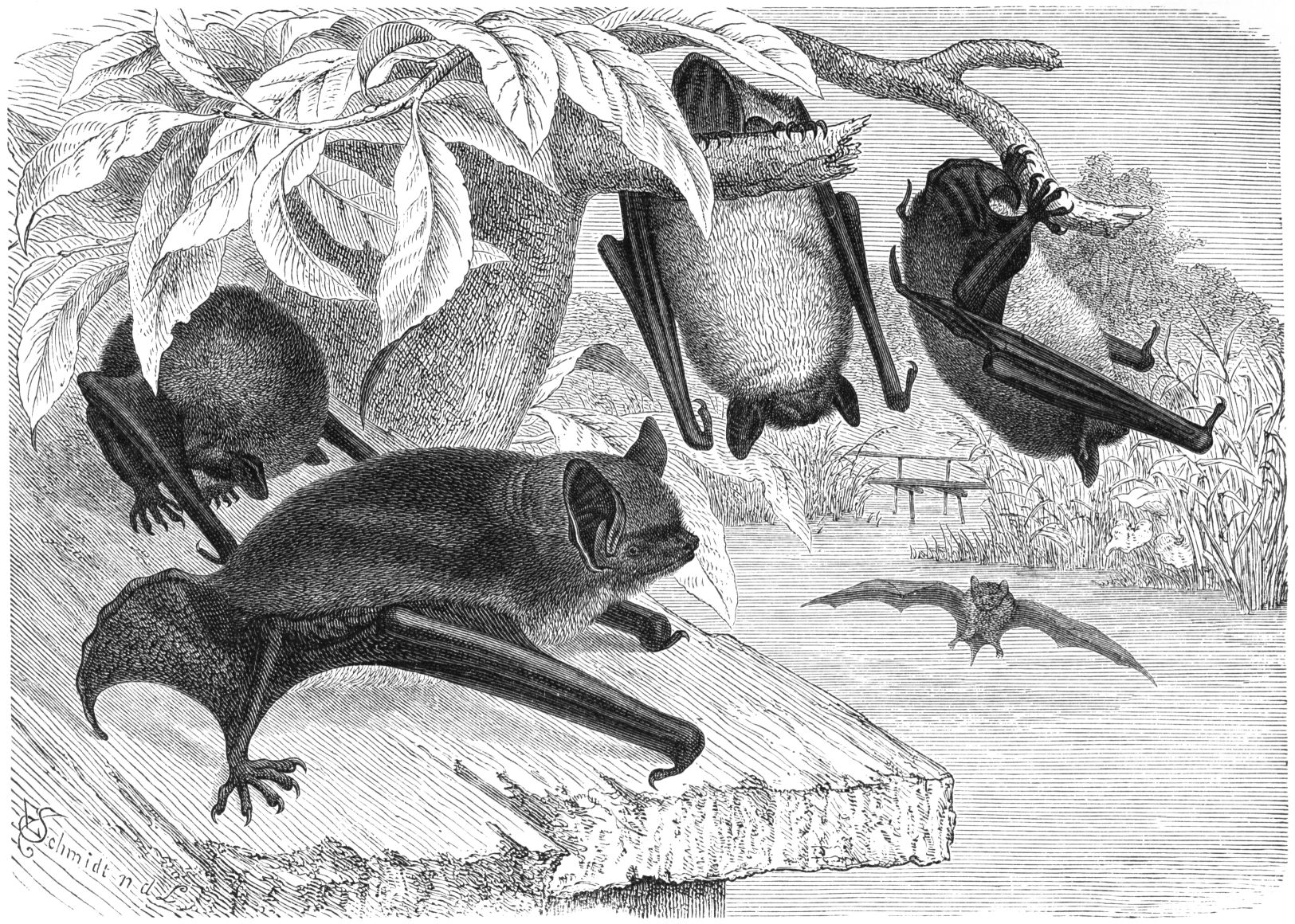
Daubenton's bat

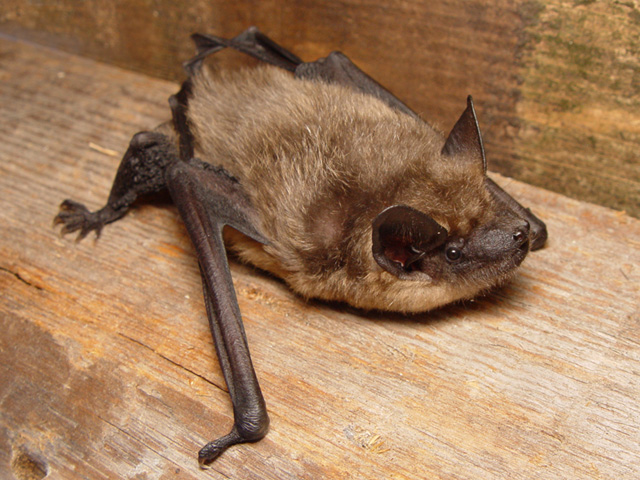
Serotine bat

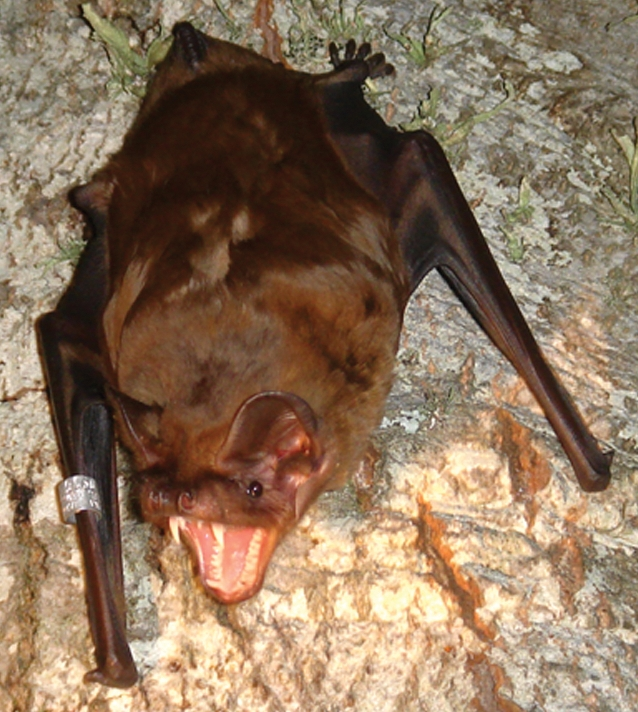
Greater noctule bat

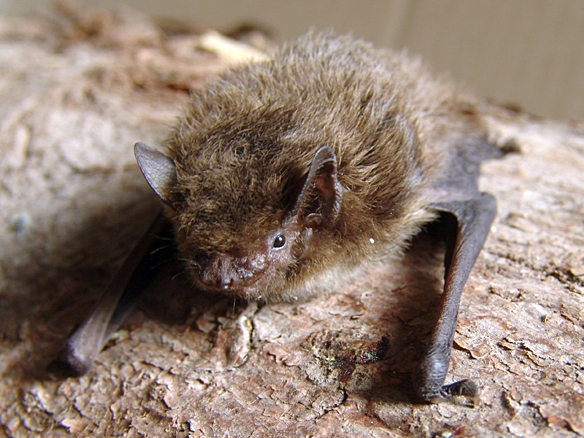
Nathusius' pipistrelle

The bats' most distinguishing feature is that their forelimbs are developed as wings, making them the only mammals capable of flight. Bat species account for about 20% of all mammals.

- Family: Vespertilionidae
  - Subfamily: Myotinae
    - Genus: Myotis
      - Bechstein's bat, M. bechsteini NT
      - Lesser mouse-eared bat, M. blythii LC
      - Long-fingered bat, M. capaccinii VU
      - Daubenton's bat, M. daubentonii LC
      - Geoffroy's bat, M. emarginatus LC
      - Greater mouse-eared bat, M. myotis LC
      - Whiskered bat, M. mystacinus LC
      - Natterer's bat, M. nattereri LC
  - Subfamily: Vespertilioninae
    - Genus: Barbastella
      - Western barbastelle, B. barbastellus NT
    - Genus: Eptesicus
      - Northern bat, E. nilssoni LC
      - Serotine bat, E. serotinus LC
    - Genus: Hypsugo
      - Savi's pipistrelle, H. savii LC
    - Genus: Nyctalus
      - Greater noctule bat, N. lasiopterus NT
      - Lesser noctule, N. leisleri LC
      - Common noctule, N. noctula LC
    - Genus: Pipistrellus
      - Common pipistrelle, P. pipistrellus LC
      - Kuhl's pipistrelle, P. kuhlii LC
      - Nathusius' pipistrelle, P. nathusii LC
    - Genus: Plecotus
      - Brown long-eared bat, P. auritus LC
      - Grey long-eared bat, P. austriacus NT
    - Genus: Vespertilio
      - Parti-coloured bat, V. murinus LC
  - Subfamily: Miniopterinae
    - Genus: Miniopterus
      - Common bent-wing bat, M. schreibersii VU
- Family: Rhinolophidae
  - Subfamily: Rhinolophinae
    - Genus: Rhinolophus
      - Mediterranean horseshoe bat, R. euryale NT
      - Greater horseshoe bat, R. ferrumequinum LC
      - Lesser horseshoe bat, R. hipposideros LC
      - Mehely's horseshoe bat, R. mehelyi VU

== Order: Cetacea (whales) ==
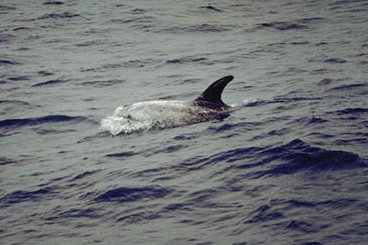
Risso's dolphin

The order Cetacea includes whales, dolphins and porpoises. They are the mammals most fully adapted to aquatic life with a spindle-shaped nearly hairless body, protected by a thick layer of blubber, and forelimbs and tail modified to provide propulsion underwater.

- Suborder: Mysticeti
  - Family: Balaenopteridae
    - Genus: Balaenoptera
      - Fin whale, Balaenoptera physalus EN
- Suborder: Odontoceti
  - Superfamily: Platanistoidea
    - Family: Delphinidae (marine dolphins)
      - Genus: Delphinus
        - Short-beaked common dolphin, Delphinus delphis
      - Genus: Grampus
        - Risso's dolphin, Grampus griseus DD
      - Genus: Tursiops
        - Common bottlenose dolphin, Tursiops truncatus

== Order: Carnivora (carnivorans) ==
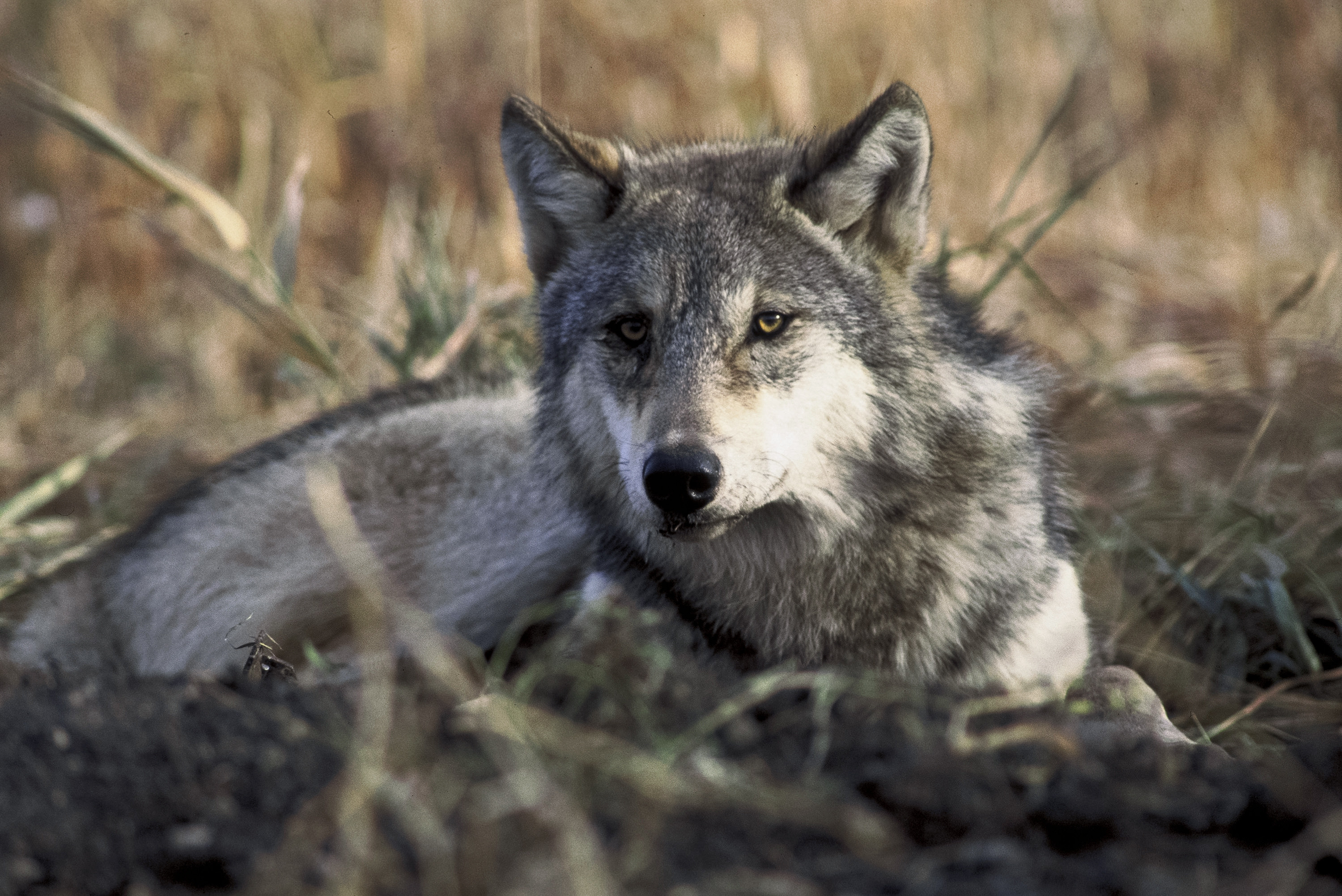
Gray wolf

European jackal (Canis aureus moreotica), a subspecies of the golden jackal

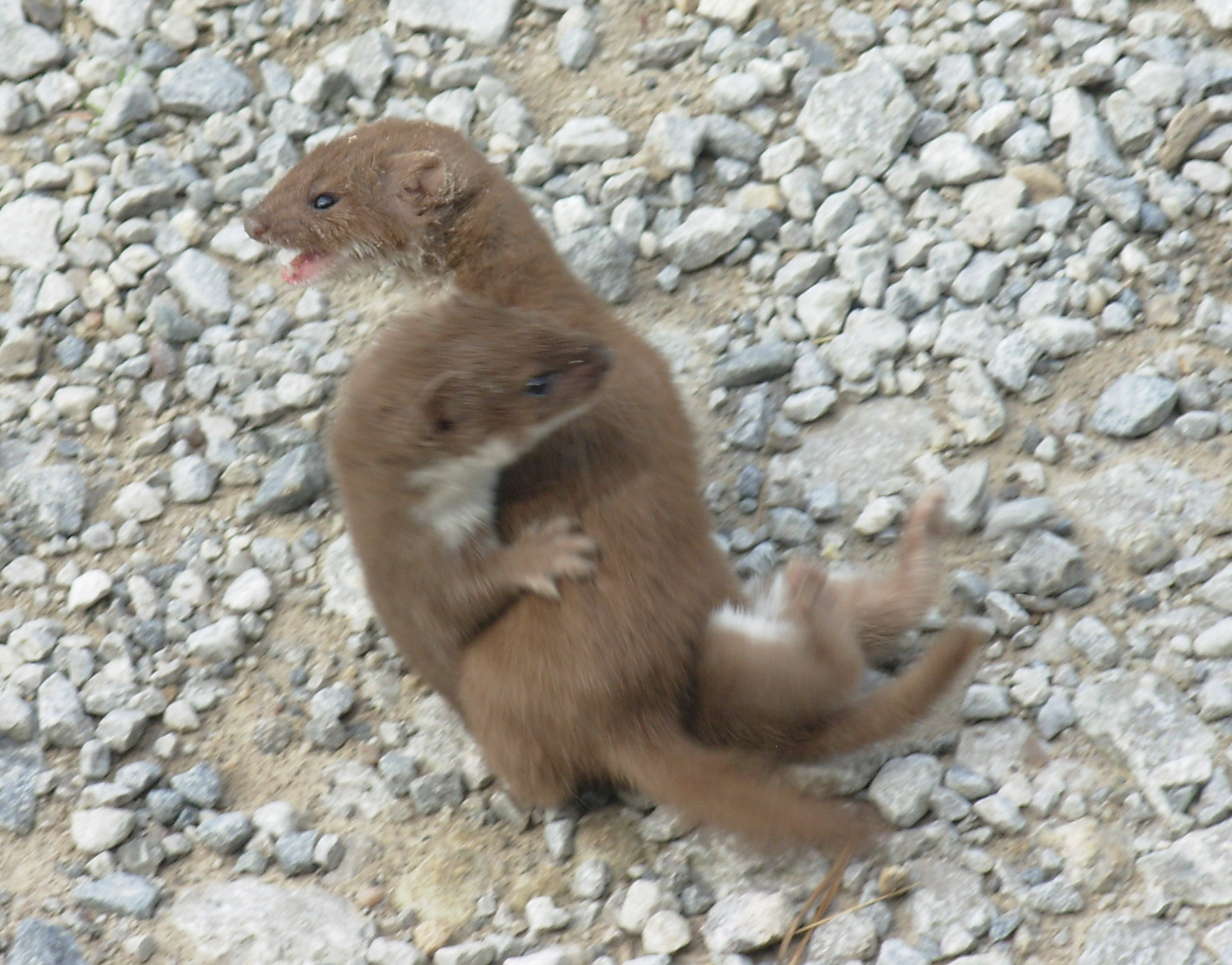
Least weasel

There are over 260 species of carnivorans, the majority of which feed primarily on meat. They have a characteristic skull shape and dentition.

- Suborder: Feliformia
  - Family: Felidae (cats)
    - Subfamily: Felinae
      - Genus: Felis
        - European wildcat, F. silvestris LC
      - Genus: Lynx
        - Eurasian lynx, L. lynx LC
- Suborder: Caniformia
  - Family: Canidae (dogs, foxes)
    - Genus: Vulpes
      - Red fox, V. vulpes LC
    - Genus: Canis
      - Golden jackal, C. aureus LC
      - Gray wolf, C. lupus
        - Eurasian wolf, C. l. lupus LC
    - Genus: Nyctereutes
      - Raccoon dog, N. procyonoides LC introduced
  - Family: Ursidae (bears)
    - Genus: Ursus
      - Brown bear, U. arctos
        - Eurasian brown bear, U. a. arctos LC
  - Family: Mustelidae (mustelids)
    - Genus: Lutra
      - Eurasian otter, L. lutra NT
    - Genus: Martes
      - Beech marten, M. foina LC
    - Genus: Meles
      - European badger, M. meles LC
    - Genus: Mustela
      - Stoat, M. erminea LC
      - Least weasel, M. nivalis LC
      - European polecat, M. putorius LC
    - Genus: Neogale
      - American mink, N. vison LC presence uncertain, introduced

== Order: Artiodactyla (even-toed ungulates) ==
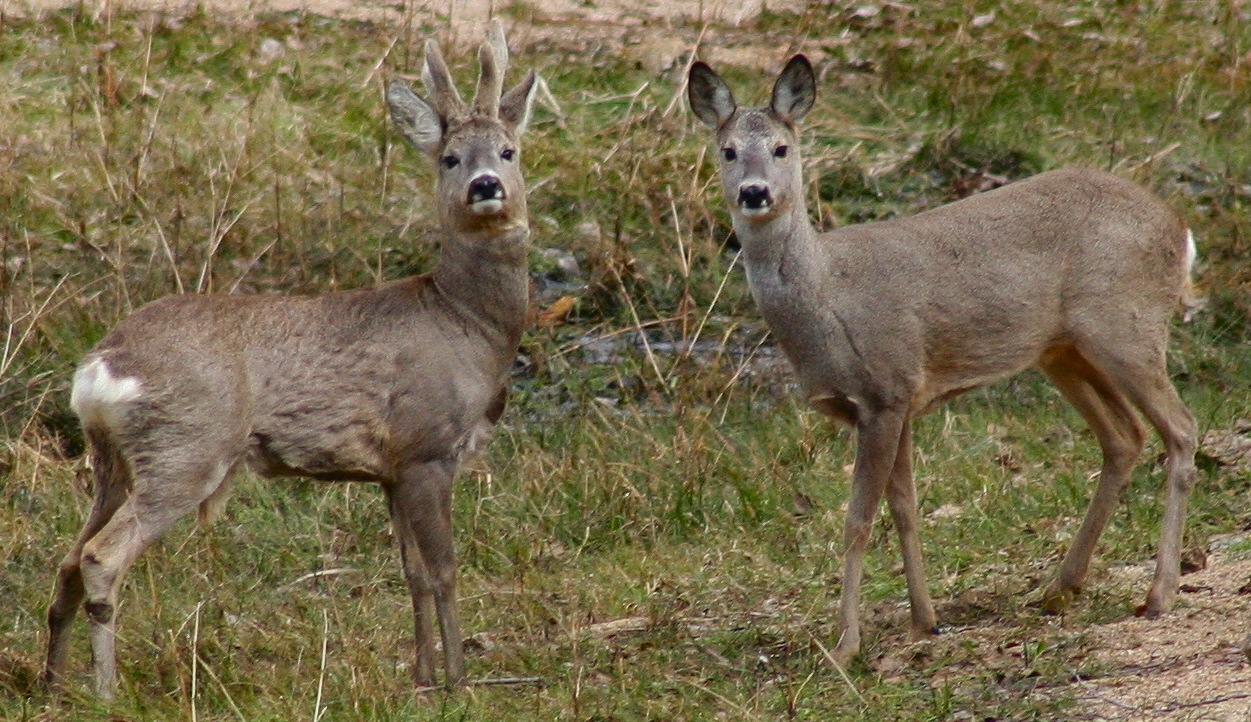
Roe deer

The even-toed ungulates are ungulates whose weight is borne about equally by the third and fourth toes, rather than mostly or entirely by the third as in perissodactyls. There are about 220 artiodactyl species, including many that are of great economic importance to humans.

- Family: Suidae (pigs)
  - Subfamily: Suinae
    - Genus: Sus
      - Wild boar, S. scrofa LC
- Family: Cervidae (deer)
  - Subfamily: Cervinae
    - Genus: Cervus
      - Red deer, C. elaphus LC
    - Genus: Dama
      - European fallow deer, D. dama LC
  - Subfamily: Capreolinae
    - Genus: Capreolus
      - Roe deer, C. capreolus LC
- Family: Bovidae (bovids)
  - Subfamily: Caprinae
    - Genus: Capra
      - Alpine ibex, C. ibex LC introduced

== Locally extinct ==
The following species are locally extinct in the country:

- Mediterranean monk seal, Monachus monachus

== See also ==
- List of chordate orders
- Lists of mammals by region
- List of prehistoric mammals
- Mammal classification
- List of mammals described in the 2000s
