= National Education Institute Slovenia =

Government school education agency of Slovenia

Coordinates: 46°2′55.68″N 14°31′7.61″E

The National Education Institute Slovenia - NEI (Slovene: Zavod Republike Slovenije za Šolstvo, ZRSŠ) is the main national research, development and consultancy institution in the field of pre-school, primary and general secondary education in Slovenia. It covers kindergartens, elementary schools, secondary schools, music schools and boarding schools.

== Responsibilities and areas ==
The National Education Institute Slovenia has the main responsibility for developing the general education curriculum in Slovenia. It conducts research, develops recommendations and guidelines, supports professional development, and promotes innovations and changes in practice. It also supports the development of theory and legislation. The mission of the institute is to promote lifelong learning according to the goals of sustainable development, innovative environments, and innovation in general.

== History ==
The National Education Institute Slovenia was founded on May 22, 1956 as the Educational Research Institute. On February 21, 1959, it was renamed the Institute for the Development of Education and started operating as a state administrative institution. Its primary duties were evaluation and counselling.

On March 1, 1963, the institute was transformed from a state administrative institution into an independent institution, which henceforth operated on the principles of the then-current policy of self-management. It focused primarily on the didactics and methodology of teaching, the professional development of teachers, and the issue of pedagogical publications; its task was also to gather and study pedagogical documentation.

In 1965 the Institute for the Progress of Education and the Institute for Vocational and Technical Training were merged into the National Education Institute of the SRS. In 1969, the Slovenian Assembly passed the Law on the Pedagogical Service. On its basis the independent self-managing National Education Institute Slovenia was transformed into a state administrative body.

On September 1, 1969, the institutes for education and pedagogic services were transformed into the nine organizational units of the National Education Institute, with regional units in Celje, Dravograd (from 1979 in Slovenj Gradec), Koper/Capodistria, Kranj, Ljubljana, Maribor, Murska Sobota, Novo Mesto, Nova Gorica, Murska Sobota. All of the aforementioned units are still in operation. The main characteristics of the National Education Institute had been common planning, a common programme and joint work reports.

After Slovenia gained independence in 1991, the National Education Institute Slovenia became part of the Ministry of Education and Sports. On July 6, 1995, the National Education Institute Slovenia began to operate as a public institution, which has remained unchanged since.

Today the National Education Institute Slovenia's main responsibilities include preparing expert documents and systemic conditions for quality education development; developing effective educational practice in cooperation with kindergartens and schools; monitoring and evaluating innovations; supporting the professional development of teachers, other education staff and headteachers; international cooperation; collaboration with Slovenian schools abroad (in Italy, Austrian Carinthia and Porabje); and performing other public-service tasks under the authority of the Ministry of Education. It organizes study meetings, consultancies, thematic conferences, seminars and e-workshops; develops syllabi and subject didactics; runs national and international projects; and publishes monographs, textbooks and professional journals. It maintains nine regional units (Celje, Koper/Capodistria, Kranj, Ljubljana, Maribor, Murska Sobota, Nova Gorica, Novo Mesto and Slovenj Gradec) that support practice-oriented cooperation across Slovenia.

The founding decision of the Government of the Republic of Slovenia (No. 021-04/95-6/1-8 of 6 July 1995) has been amended several times, most recently by a decision of 15 June 2021 and a comprehensively renewed founding act adopted in early 2025 that extended, among else, the director’s term of office from four to five years.

In 2026 the Institute marked its 70th anniversary (counting from its foundation on 22 May 1956 as the Educational Research Institute / Commission for the Study of Education). The anniversary celebrations included a formal academy attended by the President of Slovenia and the Minister of Education.

As of October 1^{st}, 2024 the director is Jasna Rojc (previously state secretary at the Ministry of Education), succeeding Vinko Logaj (director 2014 - 2024).
