= BGM =

BGM can refer to:

== Locations ==
- Boddington Gold Mine, a gold mine in Western Australia.

== Mathematics ==
- Bayesian Graphical Model, a form of probability model.
- Brace Gatarek Musiela LIBOR market model: a finance model, also called BGM in reference to some of its inventors

== Medicine ==
- Blood glucose monitoring, or the device used to monitor blood glucose levels

== Music ==
- Background music
- BGM (album), 1981 album by Yellow Magic Orchestra
- Bonnier Gazell Music
- BGM (song), track on 2019 Wale album Wow... That's Crazy
- Blackpool Grime Media, a grime music youtube channel (see Blackpool#Scenes)

== Transport ==
- Bellingham railway station serving London, England (National Rail station code: BGM)
- Greater Binghamton Airport serving Binghamton, New York (IATA Code: BGM)

== Other ==
- Bituminous geomembrane
- Black Guns Matter
- an abbreviation for the former Bell Globemedia, now Bell Media
- The US Military designation for a surface attack guided missile with multiple launch environments
  - BGM-71 TOW missile
  - BGM-109 Tomahawk missile
