= Liberal Gun Club =

American gun owners group

- Founded: 2008
- Tax ID no.: 27-1970389
- Legal status: 501(c)(4) nonprofit organization
- Location: United States
- Members: 4,500 (2025)
- Official language: English
- Website: theliberalgunclub.com

The Liberal Gun Club is an American gun owners group composed primarily of people with liberal views. The group was founded in 2008 and has a pro-Second Amendment position on gun ownership.

Its mission statement states that "the mission of The Liberal Gun Club is to provide a voice for gun-owning liberals and moderates in the national conversation on gun rights, gun legislation, firearms safety, and shooting sports."

In regard to gun control, the group favors "root cause mitigation for violence prevention, stronger mental health care, addressing poverty, homelessness and unemployment rather than focusing on prohibiting or restricting one tool." They also generally oppose "assault weapon" bans, but individual members have a wide range of opinions. In 2014, the group had about 1,200 members. From 2016 to 2017, after the Orlando nightclub shooting and the 2016 United States presidential election, membership swelled 65% year over year and the group's Facebook and social media presence grew significantly as well. As of November 2025, the organization has chapters in 30 states and 4,500 members.

== Chapters ==
The Liberal Gun Club operates throughout the United States with Chapters on a state or regional level. As of June 2019, the club had active chapters in:

- Arizona
- Arkansas
- California
- Florida
- Georgia
- Illinois
- Indiana
- Massachusetts
- Michigan
- Minnesota
- Missouri
- New England
- New Jersey
- New York
- North Carolina
- Oklahoma
- Oregon
- Rocky Mountains
- Tennessee
- Texas
- Washington
- Wisconsin
- Virginia/DC/Maryland and the "Flyover States" (which are states within a six-hour drive of Chicago, Illinois).

Other chapters have been proposed. Members who do not belong to a regional Chapter participate in national and regional events. California is the largest chapter, with Oregon and Texas as the second and third largest chapters, respectively.

== See also ==
- Huey P. Newton Gun Club
- Redneck Revolt
- Socialist Rifle Association
- Black Guns Matter
- Pink Pistols
