= Maj Toure =

American libertarian political activist

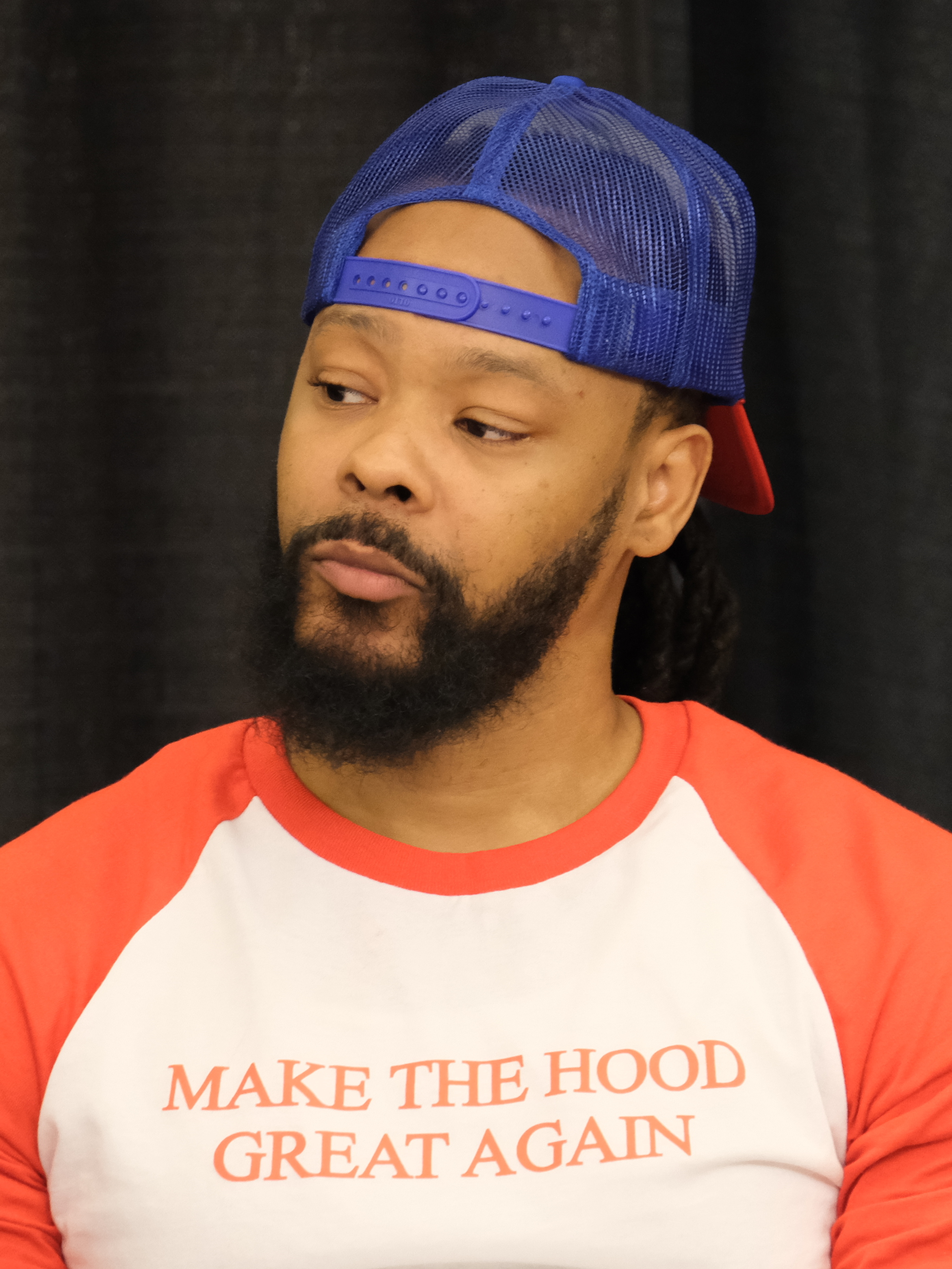
- Toure at FreedomFest 2021
- Born: Martin Anthony Jones; Philadelphia, Pennsylvania, U.S.
- Occupations: Political activist; Rapper
- Known for: Founding Black Guns Matter
- Political party: Independent (2019–present); Libertarian (until 2019)

Maj Toure (born Martin Anthony Jones) is an American libertarian political activist and rapper. Toure is closely associated with the Mises Caucus wing of the American Libertarian Party. Toure is commonly known for saying, "All gun control is racist!" and justifies this belief by stating, "It was literally started to stop black people from having the means to defend themselves."

A native of North Philadelphia, Toure founded the educational nonprofit organization Black Guns Matter in 2016. The organization advocates for the right to keep and bear arms, and promotes responsible ownership of firearms within African-American and urban communities.

He has released three rap/hip hop recordings: Solutionary Vol. 1 (2005), Solutionary Vol. 2 (2014), and Solutionary Vol. 3 (2016).

Toure was a candidate for an at-large seat in the Philadelphia City Council in the city's 2019 election. He ran as a Libertarian. In addition to his support for Second Amendment rights, his stated political priorities included: criminal justice reform; ending the practice of solitary confinement; legalization of cannabis; improved education in Philadelphia; and conflict resolution training for disconnected youths. On November 5, 2019, Toure finished 15th in a field of 17 candidates in the city's election, failing to secure a seat on the City Council. He received 5,676 votes (0.5% of the vote total).

Toure spoke at the Conservative Political Action Conference (CPAC) in February 2019.

In a dialogue with Lawrence B. Jones in 2021, Toure applauded grassroots anti-racist protestors for emphasizing that black lives do in fact matter, while denouncing Black Lives Matter, Inc. as a "money laundering operation" that "fleeces the black community," with the goal of aiding Democratic politicians.

== Worldview and influences ==
Toure’s activism is shaped by his belief in personal responsibility, self-defense, and individual liberty. He is influenced by historical figures such as Frederick Douglass, Malcolm X, and Harriet Tubman, who fought against oppression and advocated for the empowerment of marginalized people. He also draws philosophical inspiration from thinkers like John Locke, Thomas Paine, and Thomas Jefferson, whose ideas on natural rights, limited government, and the protection of individual freedoms are central to Toure’s libertarian worldview.

Toure has argued that modern gun control laws are a continuation of systemic racism, originally designed to disarm black Americans and limit their ability to defend themselves. He believes these laws disproportionately affect marginalized communities today by perpetuating disempowerment and government control. Toure’s focus on the Second Amendment and self-defense is not limited to racial issues, as he views gun ownership as essential for all citizens to resist government tyranny.

In a 2021 conversation with Lawrence B. Jones, Toure praised grassroots anti-racist protestors for their emphasis on the value of black lives but criticized Black Lives Matter, Inc. as a “money laundering operation” that exploits the black community for political gain, particularly benefiting Democratic politicians. He emphasizes that genuine empowerment comes through education, self-sufficiency, and constitutional rights, rather than reliance on political movements that, in his view, often fail to address the real needs of black Americans.

== Legal issues ==
On July 6, 2006, Toure was arrested for recklessly endangering another person, resisting arrest, disorderly conduct, and harassment by subjecting others to physical contact. On November 17, 2006, he took a plea deal in order to get into the Accelerated Rehabilitative Disposition program. He was sentenced to 20 hours of community service and anger management classes.

On February 21, 2013, Toure was ejected from the Accelerated Rehabilitative Disposition program when he violated the terms of his ARD arrangement by committing trademark counterfeiting, a first-degree misdemeanor. An undercover police officer witnessed him selling bootleg rap CDs on a commuter train and arrested him. He pleaded guilty on April 1, 2013 and was sentenced to 12 months of probation.

Toure was arrested in Philadelphia on June 20, 2023 and was charged with carrying firearms in public in Philadelphia, a first-degree misdemeanor, and carrying firearms without a license, a third-degree felony. He was charged under the alias "Maj Tourney". The case was moved to the Philadelphia Court of Common Pleas and Toure was convicted of both crimes on July 18, 2024 and sentenced on October 2, 2024 to 4 years probation.

Toure was arrested in Philadelphia on July 17, 2025 and, after a preliminary hearing, charged with rape, involuntary deviate sexual intercourse, sexual assault, and indecent assault on August 22, 2025.

== Electoral history ==
Philadelphia City Council Member At-Large, 2019 general election Vote for 7
Party	Candidate	Votes	%
Democratic	Helen Gym	205,661	15.4
Democratic	Isaiah Thomas	196,733	14.7
Democratic	Derek S. Green	189,819	14.2
Democratic	Katherine Gilmore Richardson	189,813	14.2
Democratic	Allan Domb	186,665	13.9
Working Families	Kendra Brooks	60,256	4.5
Republican	David Oh	53,742	4.0
Republican	Al Taubenberger	47,547	3.6
Working Families	Nicolas O'Rourke	46,560	3.5
Republican	Dan Tinney	46,270	3.5
Republican	Bill Heeney	43,249	3.2
Republican	Matt Wolfe	41,341	3.1
Independent	Sherrie Cohen	9,116	0.7
Independent	Joe Cox	8,880	0.7
Libertarian	Maj Toure	6,179	0.5
Independent	Steve Cherniavsky	3,480	0.4
Independent	Clarc King	2,959	0.2
Write-in		745	nil
Total votes		1,339,015	100
Democratic hold			
Democratic hold			
Democratic hold			
Democratic hold			
Democratic hold			
Working Families gain from Republican			
Republican hold			
