= Black Women's Defense League =

- Formation: 2015; 11 years ago
- Location: Dallas, Texas, United States
- Methods: Self-defense and firearms training, political education, charity, youth outreach, hurricane relief, town hall meetings, panel discussions, protests
- Founder: Niecee X

The Black Women's Defense League (BWDL) is a self-defense organization based in Dallas, Texas, United States.

== Overview ==
The BWDL was founded in 2015 by Niecee X. They were influenced by the Black Panther Party and contemporary organizations including the Huey P. Newton Gun Club, but later split from the latter group.

The BWDL describes itself as a Womanist organization. According to the group's Facebook page, it "works for the immediate pursuit of an intersectional, safe, and free society" and "organizes to provide immediate protection and services to Black Women and those most marginalized by White Supremacy." Niecee X and the group's leadership support transformative justice approaches to conflict and crime.

The group provides self-defense and arms training to "abused, underserved black women and marginalized genders", and also engages in political education, charity work and youth outreach work, and hosts town hall meetings, panel discussions and other events. In 2019 Niecee X founded Revolution Cafe & Bookstore, a vegan restaurant and bookstore in Dallas, which works in concert with the BWDL.

== Activities ==
In January 2017 BWDL members attended the Women's March in Washington, D.C.

In September 2017 the group was involved in relief efforts in Houston, Port Arthur and Beaumont, Texas, following Hurricane Harvey. Its activities focused on groups otherwise overlooked by relief organizations and those excluded by shelters.

In December 2017 the BWDL organised a protest against a concert by R. Kelly in Dallas due to accusations of sexual misconduct.

In May 2018 the BWDL was featured in a documentary produced by Pabst Blue Ribbon, which sought to celebrate "the voices of today's ever-evolving American dream".

== See also ==
- Assata's Daughters
- Redneck Revolt
