= Black Guns Matter =

Organization for gun safety and self defense for African Americans

- Logo of Black Guns Matter
- Abbreviation: BGM
- Formation: 2016
- Founder: Maj Toure
- Purpose: Gun rights advocacy, firearm safety

Black Guns Matter is an organization aimed at educating African Americans about gun culture in the United States, primarily around Second Amendment rights. The organization is led by Maj Toure, who founded it in 2016. Black Guns Matter has hosted workshops in multiple cities to teach the basics of firearm safety, U.S. gun laws, and conflict resolution.

== Background ==
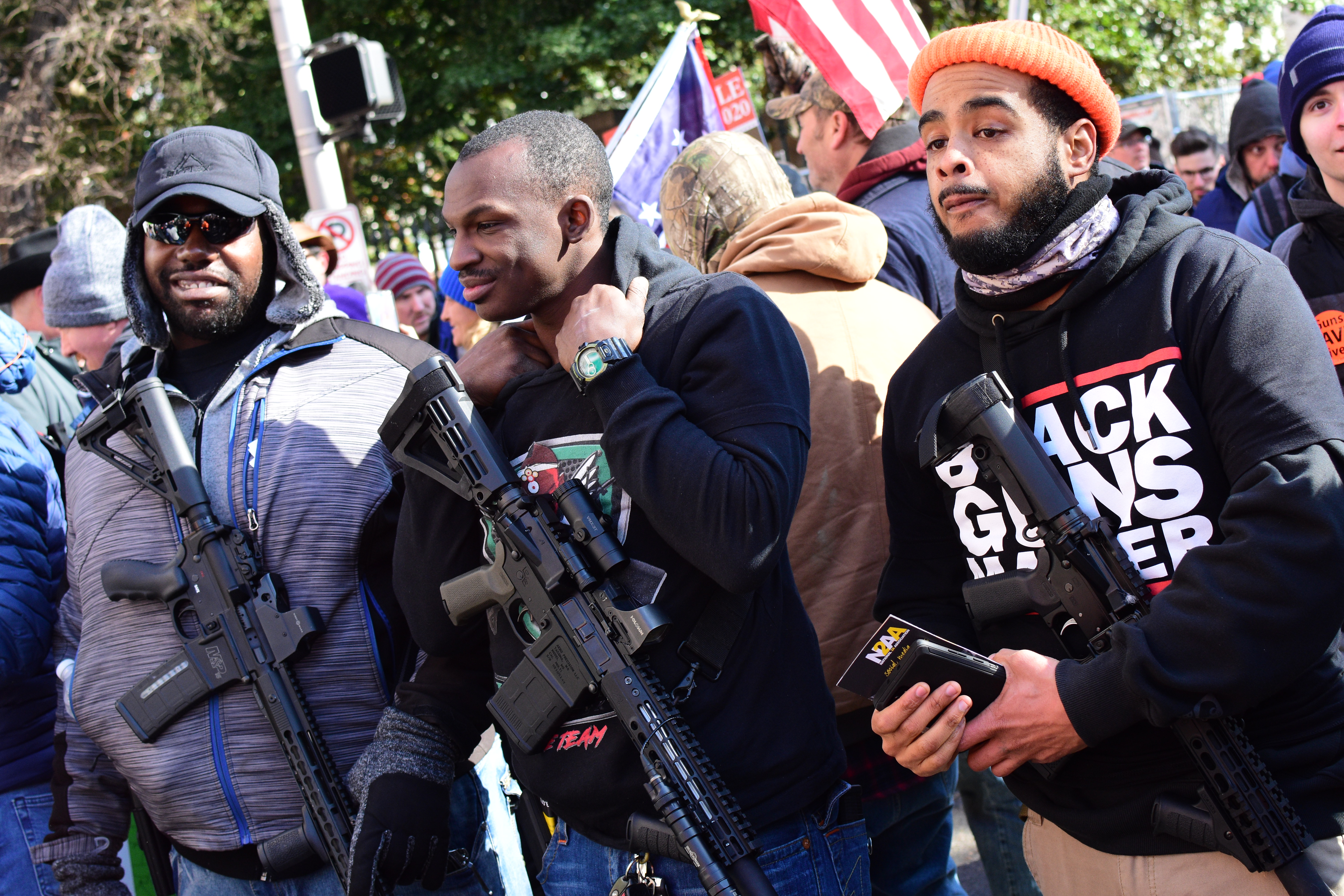
Demonstrators at the 2020 VCDL Lobby Day gun rights rally; one demonstrator can be seen wearing Black Guns Matter apparel.

In 2016, Toure founded Black Guns Matter to prevent people from being arrested on what he believed to be avoidable gun possession charges due to a lack of knowledge on how to legally purchase and carry firearms; The organization takes its name from the Black Lives Matter social movement, both sharing similar criticism of police brutality. Toure has accused the Black Lives Matter Global Network Foundation of being a "sham organization" and a "money-laundering scheme" for the Democratic Party, and argued that it lacked financial transparency.

== Views ==
In September 2019, Toure testified, representing Black Guns Matter before the U.S. House of Representatives, for a hearing on urban gun violence to argue that educating citizens on conflict resolution is more effective than gun control. The organization attributes the high homicide rates in inner cities to a failure to de-escalate from violence and a lack of gun safety. Toure said that "more Black people would be alive if they were armed". He also argued that rates of police brutality may decrease when Black men carrying firearms are viewed as less of a threat by police.

Toure argued that safety means armed self-defense and "all gun control is racist", pointing to the 1967 Mulford Act signed by then-California governor Ronald Reagan that banned open-carry in the state in reaction to the weaponized Black Panther Party. Toure ran for a Philadelphia city council seat as a member of the Libertarian Party and spoke about Second Amendment rights at events with conservative lawmakers; he said that he was both using the conservative movement and being used by it. In 2019, Toure cancelled his membership of the National Rifle Association of America (NRA), saying that it was not doing enough for Black communities. In 2021, Toure took part at the Conservative Political Action Conference.

== See also ==
- Black conservatism in the United States
- Gun politics in the United States
- Liberal Gun Club
- Huey P. Newton Gun Club
- National African American Gun Association
