= Socialist Rifle Association =

American socialist gun rights organization

- Abbreviation: SRA
- Formation: 2013; 13 years ago
- Founded at: New Mexico
- Merger of: Socialist Rifle Association LLC; Socialist Rifle Association Inc.
- Type: 501(c)(4)
- Purpose: Gun politics; Gun rights
- Headquarters: Wichita, Kansas
- Location: United States
- Services: Community service; Firearm education and training; Membership organization
- Method: Self-defense education; Firearm safety; Membership organization; Multi-tendency: social democrats, democratic socialists, communists, and anarchists
- Members: 10,000 (self-reported) (Note: November 2020)
- Legislature: Assembly of the SRA
- Website: socialistra.org

The Socialist Rifle Association (SRA) is a socialist gun rights advocacy organization based in the United States. The group describes itself as "an education and advocacy organization dedicated to providing marginalized communities and the working class with the education, the skills, and the advocates necessary to be effectively armed for self and community defense."

The organization does not explicitly endorse the Second Amendment, arguing that its historical application was intertwined with racially discriminatory gun control. The SRA has stated that "with the enshrinement of the Second Amendment also came gun control—that is to say, gun control for people of color and Indigenous people. These laws were violently upheld via slave patrols, among other mechanisms. The same slave patrols eventually became the American police force that upheld the Black Codes, further disenfranchising the rights of people of color to keep and bear arms, among many other rights."

== Background ==
The Socialist Rifle Association was created as a Facebook page in 2013, initially as a joke. As time went on, its supporters decided to make it a reality, and incorporated as a limited liability company (LLC) in New Mexico. On October 8, 2018, the Socialist Rifle Association Inc. was founded in Kansas, under the 501(c)(4) tax code provision. On October 16, 2018, a merger agreement was agreed between the two extant SRA nonprofits.

== The City of Charlottesville, et al. vs. The Pennsylvania Light Foot Militia, et al. (2018) ==
Individuals associated with an unrelated community Facebook page calling itself the SRA attended the Unite the Right rally on the counterprotest side, and were subsequently sued for their involvement. In October 2018, the city of Charlottesville filed a lawsuit against 25 groups and individuals for alleged paramilitary activity based on a recently adopted state statute. In addition to several white supremacist figures and organizations such as the Traditionalist Worker Party, League of the South and Jason Kessler, the lawsuit also listed two anti-racist groups, the original SRA group and the left-wing gun group Redneck Revolt.

== Natural disaster mutual aid ==
=== Hurricane Michael ===
In response to the landfall of the category 5 Hurricane Michael in 2018 and the perceived inadequate response of Federal Emergency Management Agency (FEMA), both the SRA and the Tallahassee branches of the Democratic Socialists of America and the Party for Socialism and Liberation formed the Hurricane Michael Mutual Aid project, which sought to distribute direct relief to those in need, including those who were unable to receive FEMA relief due to their undocumented status.

=== Hurricane Dorian ===
On August 29, 2019, the SRA began a fundraiser under the new organizational name "SRAid" for Hurricane Dorian disaster relief. On September 5, the SRA announced it had several volunteers staging equipment on the east coast in preparation for supply deliveries to under-served communities in Charleston, South Carolina, Wilmington, North Carolina, and the Lumbee Tribe in Robeson County, North Carolina.

== Membership ==
In July 2019, a third of the SRA's 2,000 members identified as LGBTQ and 8 percent are transgender. The organization claimed 10,000 active members in November 2020. The SRA has 52 local chapters operating in 33 states. The organization is headed by a National Assembly consisting of elected representatives from each chapter.

== Ideology ==
The SRA describes the goal of their organization as "to provide an alternative to the mainstream, toxic, right-wing, and non-inclusive gun culture that has dominated the firearms community for decades. We seek to provide a safe, inclusive, and left-leaning platform for talking about gun rights and self defense, free from racist and reactionary prejudices, while providing a platform for the working class to obtain the skills necessary for all aspects of community defense." The group describes itself as "working class, progressive, anarchist, socialist, communist, eco-warrior, animal liberator, anti-fascist, anti-racist, anti-capitalist, PoC, LGBTQ-plus."

=== Points of unity ===
Membership of the SRA is predicated on the acceptance of particular points of unity:

- We are working class and poor people dedicated to educating our class in the safe use of firearms for personal and community self-defense as well as recreation and subsistence hunting.
- We are a multi-tendency association of social democrats, communists, and anarchists united by class, for our class. We respect one another's political stances and differences, especially when we disagree.
- We are dedicated to Liberation and Freedom of ALL people and therefore oppose all forms of oppression and exploitation.
- We are party to our local communities and as such we volunteer in various ways to further the connections between leftist political radicals and the unorganized communities in which we live. We help feed, house and protect other working class and marginalized folks.
- We stand against the disarmament of the working class.
- We are dedicated to arming the working class, both physically and mentally.

== Chapters ==
Alabama

California:

- Inland Empire
- Los Angeles
- Orange County
- SF Bay

Colorado:

- Central Colorado

Connecticut

Delaware

Florida:

- Northeast Florida

Georgia

Illinois:

- Chicago
- Greater Illinois

Maine

Maryland

Massachusetts

Michigan

Minnesota

Missouri:

- Kansas City

Nevada:

- Las Vegas
- Reno

New Mexico

New York

- Upstate
- NYC

North Carolina:

- Charlotte
- Triad
- Triangle

Ohio:

- Central Ohio
- Northeast Ohio

Oklahoma:

- Oklahoma City

Oregon:

- Central Oregon
- Lane County
- Portland

Pennsylvania:

- Central PA
- Philadelphia
- Pittsburgh

Tennessee

Texas:

- Austin
- Houston
- San Antonio

Utah

Washington

Wisconsin:

- Madison

== See also ==
- Antifa (United States)
- Huey P. Newton Gun Club
- Liberal Gun Club
- National Rifle Association of America
- Pink Pistols
- Redneck Revolt
