= Redneck Revolt =

American far-left political group

- Predecessor: John Brown Gun Club
- Formation: 2009; 17 years ago
- Founded at: Kansas, United States
- Legal status: Disbanded in 2019; 7 years ago
- Location: United States
- Methods: Direct action, firearms and first aid training, open carry, outreach, food and clothing programs, community gardens, needle exchanges, potlucks, educational events, protests, security and medical assistance at protests

Redneck Revolt was an American political activist organization that organized predominantly among working-class people. The group supported gun rights and members often openly carried firearms. Its political positions were anti-capitalist, anti-racist and anti-fascist. Founded in Kansas in 2009, members were present at several protests against Donald Trump and against the far-right in 2017. According to its official website, the organization disbanded in 2019.

== Background ==
Redneck Revolt was founded in 2009, partly in response to the perceived contradictions of the Tea Party movement, as an offshoot of the John Brown Gun Club, a firearms training and community defense project that was itself founded in Lawrence, Kansas, in 2004. Founding member Dave Strano was previously part of the Kansas Mutual Aid Network which was involved in organizing protests against the Republican National Convention in 2004, in relation to which he and others began to train with firearms and engage in Second Amendment advocacy. In the early 2000s, John Brown Gun Club members operated anti-racist stalls at gun shows in Kansas. The John Brown Gun Club sought to "demystify" firearms and to distinguish their commitment to community self-defense from clandestine groups that advocated guerrilla warfare. Its first major mobilization was a protest against the 2005 national conference of the Minuteman Project.

Following a hiatus, the group was re-formed as a national organization in summer 2016, using both the Redneck Revolt and John Brown Gun Club names, with the intention of responding to the growth of right-wing populism, particularly among rural, working-class white people.

The group attributes their use of the word "redneck" to the time of the Coal Wars, a series of labor disputes in the United States occurring from around 1890 to around 1930, when the word became popular among coal-miners. The use of the term is also intended as a form of subversion or reappropriation. The group's name also refers to the 1921 Battle of Blair Mountain and the red bandanas worn by members emulate those worn by striking coal-miners during that conflict. A member has said that the group tries "to acknowledge the ways we've made mistakes and bought into white supremacy and capitalism, but also give ourselves an environment in which it's OK to celebrate redneck culture".

Their political influences include the 19th-century abolitionist John Brown, the Young Patriots Organization the Deacons for Defense and Justice and the Rainbow Coalition, an alliance formed in Chicago in the 1960s between the Black Panther Party, Young Lords and the Young Patriots. The group sees itself as part of a tradition of white working-class "rebellion against tyranny and oppression".

== Views ==
Core principles of Redneck Revolt

- We stand against white supremacy
- We believe in true liberty for all people
- We stand for organized defense of our communities
- We are working class and poor people
- We are an aboveground militant formation
- We stand against the nation-state and its forces which protect the bosses and the rich (police and military)
- We stand against capitalism
- We stand against the wars of the rich
- We stand against patriarchy
- We believe in the right of militant resistance
- We believe in the need for revolution

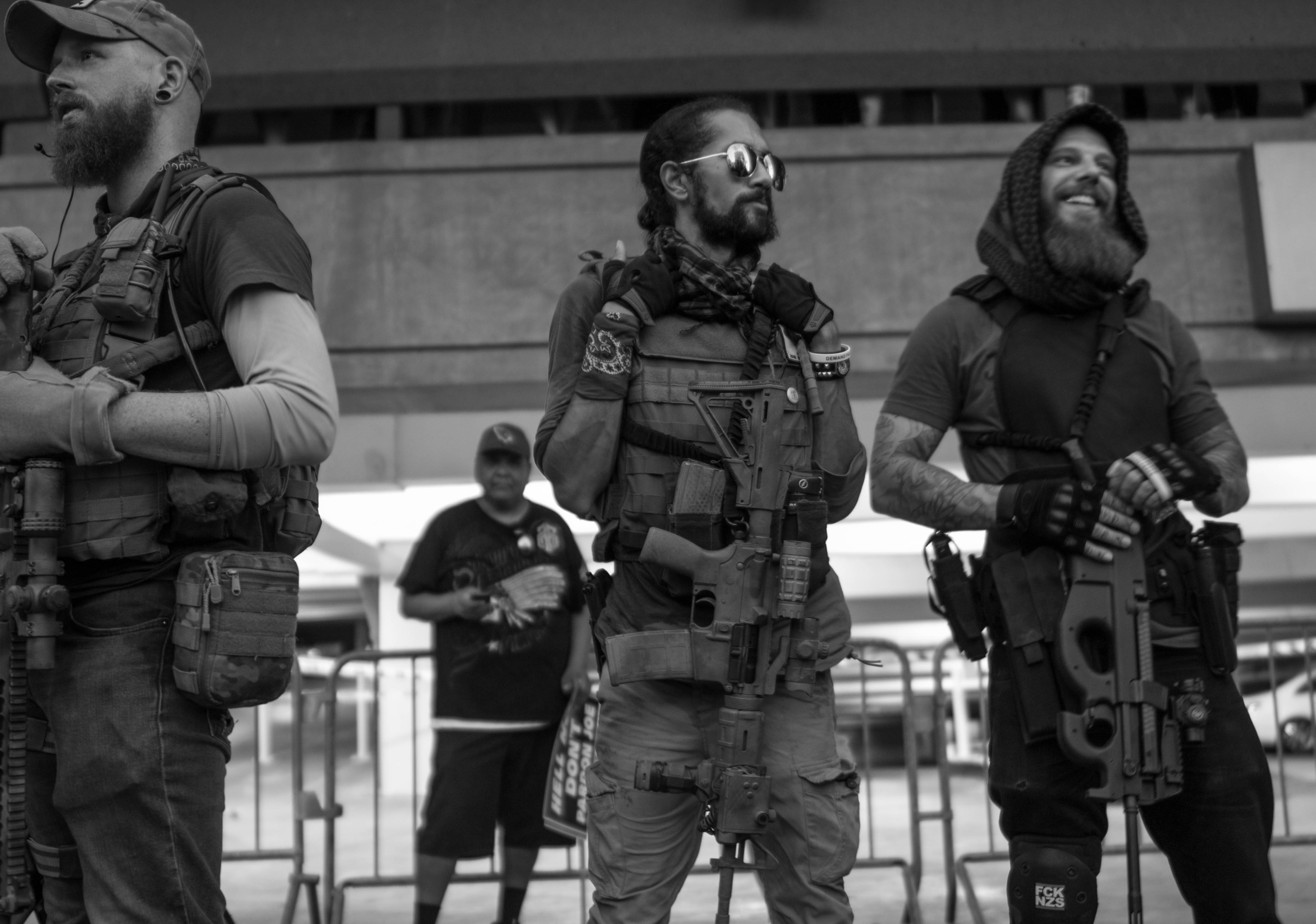
Redneck Revolt members at a Donald Trump presidential campaign rally in Phoenix, Arizona, in September 2016

Redneck Revolt was an anti-capitalist, anti-racist and anti-fascist group that used direct action tactics. Redneck Revolt supported the rights of Muslims, immigrants and LGBT people and opposed to economic inequality. The group's literature did not argue for prioritizing economic injustice over racism or vice versa, but rather argued that both should be fought simultaneously. Members also supported the Black Lives Matter movement.

The group's website included statements in opposition to capitalism, the nation state, white supremacy and "the wars of the rich" and advocates a "right of militant resistance". They advanced a critique of white supremacy which they described as "a system of violence and power that ensures that political, economic, and social power is withheld from people who aren't white". They described their purpose as follows:

We hope to incite a movement amongst working people that works toward the total liberation of all working people, regardless of skin color, religious background, sexual orientation, gender, country of birth, or any other division that bosses and politicians have used to fragment movements for social, political, and economic freedom.

The group did not identify itself as part of the political left, nor as politically liberal. A spokesperson for the Phoenix, Arizona John Brown Gun Club said in April 2017 that the group included anarchists, communists, libertarians and Republicans. The geographer Levi van Sant argued that the group's ideology was a form of libertarian socialism. The website argued for the necessity of revolution. Redneck Revolt does not have leaders and does not offer a detailed blueprint for political action. In June 2017, a spokesperson said that "[w]e don't have some grand plan for how we want to remake the world. We're tackling a specific problem, which is white supremacy, which we find to be built into capitalism".

They also did not consider themselves an antifa group. Although their goals were similar, Redneck Revolt members did not cover their faces and sought to be "as upfront about who [they] are and what [they]'re doing as possible".

The group supported gun rights and ran firearms training events. Members viewed the right to bear arms as connected to the necessity of overthrowing the state. Members often viewed the practice of openly carrying guns as a political statement that intimidates opponents and affirms gun rights. In a May 2017 interview, a member said the group uses guns only in self-defense and in "response to a rise in politically motivated violence and intimidation against vulnerable communities". In September 2017, a member said: "It's not about seizing the gun culture or becoming obsessed about guns. It's only recognizing it's useful to know how to field strip and clean a rifle as much as it is to know how to fix wiring in your house and use a circular saw". The increased visibility of Redneck Revolt in 2017 sparked debate among activists over the effects of armed protest and the possibility that the use of guns may lead to heightened violence.

In May 2017, a member said that Redneck Revolt had reached out to groups such as the 3 Percenters, a predominantly right-wing group, with whom they have some common ground. The practice of openly carrying firearms and a shared interest in guns has led to dialogs with right-wing militias. Van Sant wrote in March 2018 that "[t]hrough patient dialogue and popular education, several Redneck Revolt chapters have been able to challenge the white nationalist ideologies of these right-wing libertarian militias and flip them away from anti-immigrant and pro-capitalist positions".

The group argued that the white working-class have more in common with working-class people of color than with the wealthy. Dave Strano, a former founding member, argued:

The history of the white working class has been a history of being an exploited people. However, we've been an exploited people that further exploits other exploited people. While we've been living in tenements and slums for centuries, we've also been used by the rich to attack our neighbors, coworkers, and friends of different colors, religions and nationalities.

== Activities ==
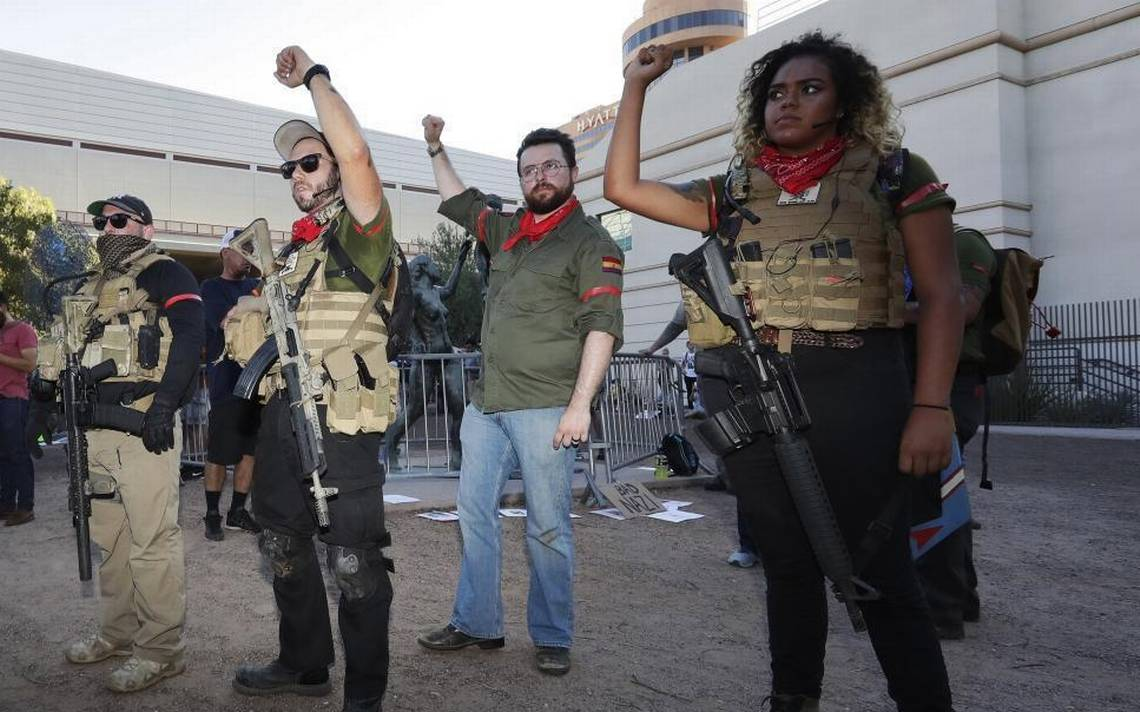
Redneck Revolt armed demonstration

Redneck Revolt was a national network. Local groups use both the Redneck Revolt and John Brown Gun Club names. There was no official count of the number of chapters, but in December 2017, the group had around 45 such local chapters across more than 30 U.S. states. The group's membership grew during the 2016 presidential election and following the August 2017 Unite the Right rally in Charlottesville, Virginia. In 2018, local groups in Shelby, North Carolina, Portland, Oregon, and Asheville and Boone, North Carolina, disaffiliated from the national network.

The group focused on anti-racist organizing among white poor and working-class people, although members were not exclusively white. For instance, around 30 percent were people of color. In May 2018, a member said that at least one third of the group's membership were women, people of color or non-binary people. Administrative and communications activities were divided equally along lines of gender. Speaking to Mark Bray, author of Antifa: The Anti-Fascist Handbook, one of Redneck Revolt's co-founders said the group's membership included veterans, former Republicans and former members of the 3 Percenters.

Redneck Revolt was active in spaces in which white supremacist groups also often recruit, including country music concerts, flea markets, gun shows, NASCAR events, rodeos and state fairs. Chapters provided firearms and first aid training, food and clothing programs and community gardens and hosted needle exchanges, potlucks and educational events. Activities around racial justice and transgender rights were predominantly oriented toward rural white people, while firearms training events were oriented toward women and people of color. In a September 2017 interview, a member said that the group was exploring ways to respond to health care challenges and food shortages. Some of the group's activities were modeled after the Survival Programs pursued by the Black Panther Party and the Young Patriots Organization in the 1960s.

=== 2016–2019 ===
During the Dakota Access Pipeline protests in 2016, Redneck Revolt published a pamphlet addressed to members of right-wing militias that argued there was no reason why "the white working-class ... [should] find solidarity with rich white ranch owners against the government, but not working-class people of color defending their own land and community".

The Phoenix, Arizona chapter of Redneck Revolt openly carried firearms outside of the Arizona State Legislature on the day of the inauguration of Donald Trump in January 2017. They declared support for those opposing Trump, including immigrants, LGBTQ people and Muslims.

In April 2017, members attended a counter-protest against groups including the League of the South, the Traditionalist Worker Party and the National Socialist Movement in Pikeville, Kentucky. Later in April, members hosted a barbecue in Harrisburg, Pennsylvania, where Trump was marking his 100th day in office.

Silver Valley Redneck Revolt, a local chapter, organized a counter-demonstration against a Ku Klux Klan rally in Asheboro, North Carolina, in May 2017. In a Facebook post, the group said: "We need to let the Klan know that if they leave their enclaves there will be a broad response from the community. ... This event is to publicly denounce the Klan, their beliefs, and show that we will not back down".

A local chapter of Redneck Revolt was part of a counter-protest against a June 2017 rally in support of Trump in Portland, Oregon. Also in June, members were part of a protest against the Christian conservative organization Focus on the Family in Colorado Springs, Colorado, which coincided with a speech by Mike Pence to celebrate the group's fortieth anniversary. On June 23, armed members of Redneck Revolt attended a protest in Kalkaska, Michigan, in response to anti-Muslim comments made by Jeff Sieting, the village president. Members carried a banner in support of Muslims and said they were there to protect the protesters from counter-protesters supporting Sieting.

In August 2017, members participated in protests against Trump's speech in Phoenix, Arizona. In February 2018, Dwayne E. Dixon, a member of Redneck Revolt and a teaching assistant professor at the University of North Carolina at Chapel Hill, was found not guilty of misdemeanour gun charges for his role in a protest against a Ku Klux Klan event in Durham, North Carolina, the previous August. In September 2017, Redneck Revolt supported the Juggalo March on Washington, a protest by juggalos against their designation as a gang. Redneck Revolt's statement said the march aligned with their "belief in the right to community self-determination and self-defense".

In October 2017, a branch of Redneck Revolt in Suffolk County, New York, was involved in organizing a candlelight vigil for people suffering from opioid addiction and families affected by the opioid epidemic.

=== Unite the Right rally ===
At the Unite the Right rally in Charlottesville, Virginia, on August 11–12, 2017, several Redneck Revolt chapters provided armed security and medical assistance for counter-protesters. Days later, members provided security at a "Hate Is Not Welcome in Lane County" march in Eugene, Oregon, in response to the events in Charlottesville.

In October 2017, Redneck Revolt was one of a number of groups named as a defendant in a lawsuit filed on behalf of the city of Charlottesville and several Charlottesville-based businesses and neighborhood associations which sought to prohibit militia and paramilitary activity in Virginia. The groups and individuals named as defendants which also included the white supremacist Jason Kessler were accused of unlawful paramilitary activity, falsely assuming the role of law enforcement officers and being a public nuisance. The lawsuit identified Redneck Revolt and the Socialist Rifle Association, an anti-fascist group that defends working-class people's right to bear arms, as "private militia groups ... [that] helped create and secure a staging area for counter-protestors".

Mary McCord, a former federal prosecutor who played a leading role in the lawsuit, described the decision to include Redneck Revolt among the defendants as "painful" and said: "This case was not conceived of because of Redneck Revolt, that's for sure. They fit the description, so it was pretty hard not to include them". In June 2018, a group of members of clergy asked the city and the other plaintiffs to remove Redneck Revolt from the complaint. They argued: "There is a marked difference between the armed white supremacist groups who invaded Charlottesville with the intent to do harm and the armed anti-racist groups who came to Charlottesville to assist in supporting and protecting our most marginalized communities". A lead attorney for the plaintiffs responded as follows: "The basis for this lawsuit is not about motives – it's about engaging in paramilitary activity. That's why Redneck Revolt was named as a defendant, and why they remain in the suit". Redneck Revolt and Kessler signed consent decrees to end paramilitary activity in Charlottesville to resolve the lawsuit when they were left as the only defendants in early July 2018. The consent decree prohibits members from returning to Charlottesville "as part of a unit of two or more persons acting in concert while armed with a firearm, weapon, shield or any item whose purpose is to inflict bodily harm, at any demonstration, rally, protest or march". Redneck Revolt issued a statement saying that it had chosen to end the lawsuit and to "focus our energies on the many important fights ahead".

== Significance ==
In September 2017, the historian Noel Ignatiev expressed concern regarding Redneck Revolt's commitment to "defense of our communities". Ignatiev argued that "in this society those who share our material conditions, our neighbors, our family members, our friends, the people working alongside us, usually reflect which race they (and we) are assigned to" and contended that "[t]he goal is not to defend the white community but to abolish it, and along with it all communities defined by racial preference or oppression". He also criticised the group for failing to challenge "institutions that reproduce white supremacy—neither the criminal justice system, nor the schools, nor employment discrimination, nor real estate lending and renting policies" and concluded that "white people organized as whites are dangerous to the working class and to humanity, and white people with guns organized as whites are doubly so—and this is true regardless of the intentions of the organizers". Gabriel Kuhn responded to Ignatiev in a 2018 article. Kuhn argued that "organizations with the aim to primarily mobilize and organize among the white working class ... are mandatory if we don't want to simply abandon this part of the population and hand it to the right on a silver platter".

In March 2018, the geographer Levi van Sant argued:

[T]he Redneck Revolt model of Libertarian Socialism reveals important things, and should be an important part of the U.S. Left. Of particular importance was their Gramscian effort to read for the 'good sense in the common sense' of right-wing populism through radical and grassroots engagement.

Van Sant has also identified three lessons that Redneck Revolt offers to the American left, namely that working-class white people "are not inherently conservative"; that the group's success was drawn from their critique of modern American liberalism, including on firearms issues; and that they do not employ the rhetoric of white privilege, diversity or inclusion, but instead "position themselves as part of working class and white rural communities" and "act in solidarity with oppressed peoples". Van Sant concluded that "[t]he case of Redneck Revolt suggests there are promising alternatives to Trumpism emanating from the U.S. countryside too often ignored by the U.S. left".

In 2019 the sociologist Teal Rothschild wrote that "Redneck Revolt brings venerable activist traditions to bear on very contemporary issues, including 21st century identity politics." Rothschild argued that while Redneck Revolt members see both anti-racism and bearing arms as part of a strategy of aiding marginalized people, media representations tend to depict them "as an oxymoron—as if gun carrying and anti-racism are not two positions, but two opposing poles." Rothschild noted that "contemporary social movement studies have begun to center groups that span multiple identities and causes, and movements like Redneck Revolt suggest exactly why that matters. ... [Redneck Revolt] reminds us of the capacity for a single organization to hold a multiplicity of meanings, aims, and practices."

== See also ==
- Anti-Racist Action, a network of anti-fascists and anti-racists in North America
- Black Women's Defense League, a self-defense organization based in Texas
- Black Guns Matter, an organization that educates African Americans about gun use
- Huey P. Newton Gun Club, a self-defense organization based in Texas
- Young Patriots Organization, a Chicago-based leftist group of white Appalachians
- Poor White, a sociocultural classification used to describe economically disadvantaged white people
- Socialist Rifle Association, a socialist firearm organization
