= One handgun a month law =

A one-handgun a month law is a law which limits handgun purchases to one per 30-days, for an individual. Proponents supported such laws in the effort to keep criminals, or would be criminals from amassing large numbers of handguns in a short period of time. Supporters argued that gun traffickers frequently purchase large numbers of cheap handguns from states which lack such laws in order to transport and sell them within states with such laws.

The first law of such nature was passed in 1975 in the state of South Carolina (which was repealed in 2004). The policy gained some further recognition, after the state of Virginia enacted similar legislation in 1993 (which was repealed in 2012). At the time, it was claimed that 40% of the guns used in crime in New York City could be traced back to the state of Virginia.

The Virginia one-handgun-a-month law was effectively resurrected in 2020 when the Virginia General Assembly enacted SB69. The legislation exempted Concealed Handgun Permit holders from this prohibition.

As of 2012, New York City, the District of Columbia, California, Maryland, and New Jersey had one-handgun-a-month laws. The District of Columbia's law was struck down by a federal appeals court in 2015. In March 2024, a federal district judge ruled the California law unconstitutional, under the precedent of the Supreme Court's 2020 Bruen decision.
