= Saul Cornell =

American historian

Saul Cornell is the Paul and Diane Guenther Chair in American History at Fordham University. He was professor of history at Ohio State University and the director of the Second Amendment Research Center at the John Glenn Institute.

== Life ==
He received a PhD from the University of Pennsylvania in 1989 and is an authority on early American constitutional thought.

He is the author of The Other Founders: Anti-Federalism and the Dissenting Tradition in America (1999) for which he won the 2001 Cox Book Prize and A Well-Regulated Militia: the Founding Fathers and the Origins of Gun Control in America (2006). He is also the co-author of many other publications, including the textbook Visions of America: A History of the United States (2009). Recently, he authored an article on Salon regarding the 2011 Tucson shooting and Gun Control.

In addition to book writing, he has contributed to numerous Amicus curiae briefs in court cases involving the 2nd Amendment. Most notably, he is the co-author of an Amicus Brief supporting Washington D.C.'s hand gun ban filed in District of Columbia v. Heller, and New York State Rifle & Pistol Association Inc. v. Bruen.

== Works ==
- Jennifer D Keene; Saul Cornell; Edward T O'Donnell Visions of America: A History of the United States (2009) ISBN 9780321066879
- A Well-Regulated Militia: the Founding Fathers and the Origins of Gun Control in America (2006) ISBN 9780195341034
- The Other Founders: Anti-Federalism and the Dissenting Tradition in America (1999) ISBN 9780807825037
