= National African American Gun Association =

Firearm education organization

- Founded: February 28, 2015; 11 years ago
- Members: 45,000+
- Founder: Philip Smith
- Vice President: Douglas Jefferson
- Website: naaga.co

The National African American Gun Association (NAAGA) is an organization that promotes gun rights among African-Americans in the United States. It has over 45,000 members, more than 75 chapters in the United States, and has grown significantly in reaction to Black deaths. The organization was founded by Phillip Smith in 2015.

== History ==
Philip Smith founded NAAGA in February 2015 in honor of Black History Month. His goal was to educate African-Americans on gun usage and ownership. Organizers say NAAGA is a civil rights organization "that aims to build community and promote self-protection". Smith founded NAAGA in response to discrimination against Black gun owners.

From 2015 to 2020, the organization has grown to over 45,000 members, with 75 chapters, and is expected to open 25 more within the coming year. Membership first spiked when Donald Trump was elected president. Smith attributed part of the growth to "a political climate where people with racist views feel emboldened to talk about and act on those views".

Eric Sanders, the vice president for the Kansas City, Missouri, chapter, said "we have a large group that's coming into the organization, and 60–70% are women now."

NAAGA condemned the shooting of Philando Castile.
