= Campaign Against Arms Trade =

UK-based organisation working towards the abolition of the international arms trade

- Abbreviation: CAAT
- Founded: 1974
- Purpose: Opposition to arms trading
- Location: London, United Kingdom
- Award: Right Livelihood Award
- Website: www.caat.org.uk

The Campaign Against Arms Trade (CAAT) is a UK-based campaigning organisation working towards the abolition of the international arms trade. It was founded in 1974 by a coalition of peace groups. It has been involved in several high-profile campaigns, including a legal challenge against the Serious Fraud Office's decision to suspend a corruption investigation into BAE Systems in 2007. On 27 September 2012, it was honoured with a Right Livelihood Award for its "innovative and effective campaigning".

== Research ==
Campaigns are founded on research into the arms trade and arms companies, and their relationship with the UK government and military, through political, financial and military support. The focus is on arms exports, although they recognise that there is a close relationship with military procurement. The research places particular emphasis on debunking myths and exposing hidden features of the arms trade, and large government subsidies given to the arms industry, largely through government research and development but also through export credits, government promotion and military attaches. In 2011, it commissioned the Stockholm International Peace Research Institute to calculate the costs of these subsidies - the figure it arrived at was £698 million annually.

The campaign has published briefings on the arms trade, including An introduction to the Arms Trade - An introduction to the impact of the arms trade, how it works, and the main justifications for the arms trade (latest edition April 2011) and Private gain, public pain - The case for ending the Government's arms selling and shutting the UKTI's Defence & Security Organisation (May 2010). It publishes a quarterly magazine, CAATnews, which is sent to supporters.

The website contains information about the arms trade, arms companies and campaigning material. A relatively recent addition is an Arms Trade App, which reveals in an accessible format the details of UK "strategic export" licences, including military equipment, issued by the Export Control Organisation of the Department for Business, Innovation and Skills. This makes previously difficult or inaccessible information available to public view and CAAT sees it as a valuable campaigning tool in helping to hold the government to account. In 2013, in collaboration with the European Network Against Arms Trade, they launched a European Union Arms Export Browser which breaks down the complex data in the EU annual reports on arms exports in an accessible manner, by year, supplier country, destination country and types of military hardware.

In 2024, CAAT, in collaboration with Demilitarise Education (dED), published Weaponising Universities: Research Collaborations between UK Universities and the Military–Industrial Complex, a report investigating the growing role of UK universities in supporting the arms industry and military research. The lead researcher was Okopi Ajonye, working on behalf of Demilitarise Education. The report reveals how universities are increasingly embedded within what it terms the "Military–Industrial–Academic Complex" (MIAC), contributing to research on autonomous weapons, artificial intelligence, and other emerging and disruptive technologies (EDTs). It also introduces the concept of Militarised Environmental Technologies (METs), where environmental innovations are adapted for military use—raising concerns about the "greenwashing" of warfare. Case studies on Imperial College London, the University of Southampton, and Lancaster University expose significant partnerships with arms companies. The report concludes with calls for transparency, ethical divestment, and a reorientation of university research towards peace, justice, and the public good.

== History ==
It has adopted and adapted different campaign targets and slogans. From 2011 the main campaign slogan has been "This is NOT OK". The Arab Spring of 2011 vindicated CAAT's focus on UK weapons sales to authoritarian regimes in the region, and helped to give the campaign greater visibility in the media and with the public.

CAAT has long campaigned against BAE Systems, highlighting allegations of corruption and political influence, rebuking claims about jobs, attending AGMs as critical shareholders, and through legal action.

=== Saudi Arabia and other corruption inquiries ===
In September 1985 BAE was a signatory to the UK's largest ever arms deal, the Al Yamamah contract to sell and service military planes to the government of Saudi Arabia. This ongoing contact has evolved through several phases and by 2006 had brought them £43 billion.

Shortly after the contract was signed, corruption allegations emerged concerning bribes paid to Saudi officials through a £60 million pound slush fund. On 12 September 2003 the Serious Fraud Office began an investigation into possible corruption. There were also SFO investigations in BAE dealings in Chile, the Czech Republic, Hungary and Austria, Qatar, Romania, South Africa and Tanzania. However, on 14 December 2006 the Government, under the personal intervention of Prime Minister Tony Blair, discontinued the Al Yamamah probe on the grounds that its conclusions might embarrass the Kingdom of Saudi Arabia and threaten Britain's national security.

The campaign, in conjunction with The Corner House, mounted a legal challenge to this decision, to assess if in curtailing the investigation the government had acted illegally. On 9 November 2007 the High Court granted the request for judicial review of the decision. Subsequently, on 10 April the High Court ruled that the government had acted illegally in stopping the corruption investigation. Lord Justice Moses and Mr Justice Sullivan ruled that the government had capitulated under intimidation from the government of Saudi Arabia and that "no-one whether within this country or outside, is entitled to interfere with the course of justice." BAE Systems continued to deny any impropriety stating the court had failed "to distinguish between a commission and a bribe."

Subsequently, the Serious Fraud Office launched an appeal that was heard before the Appellate Committee of the House of Lords on 7–8 July 2008. On 30 July the House of Lords overturned the High Court ruling, and decreed that the SFO had acted lawfully in the interest of national security. Lord Bingham stated that "the director's decision was one he was lawfully entitled to make".

The ruling attracted widespread condemnation. Nick Clegg, the leader of the Liberal Democrats, characterised the verdict as "a legal licence for international blackmail." Symon Hill commented: "BAE and the government will be quickly disappointed if they think that this ruling will bring an end to public criticism. Throughout this case we have been overwhelmed with support from people in all walks of life. There has been a sharp rise in opposition to BAE's influence in the corridors of power. Fewer people are now taken in by exaggerated claims about British jobs dependent on the arms trade. The government has been judged in the court of public opinion."

On 1 October 2009 the Serious Fraud Office announced that it would seek to prosecute BAE over bribery allegations in four countries: the Czech Republic, Romania, South Africa and Tanzania. However, in the following months no moves were made to take the case forward and in a shock move, on 5 February 2010, they announced a "plea bargain" deal whereby BAE would pay £30 million and plead guilty to failing to keep reasonably accurate accounting records in relation to its activities in Tanzania. No action would be taken in respect of the allegations with regards to the other countries. Simultaneously, BAE agreed a separate plea bargain with the US Department of Justice whereby it pleaded guilty to "conspiring to defraud the US by impairing and impeding its lawful functions, to make false statements about its Foreign Corrupt Practices Act compliance program, and to violate the Arms Export Control Act and International Traffic in Arms Regulations" and was fined $400 million.

The campaign and The Corner House mounted a legal challenge to the decision by the SFO to accept the plea bargain on the grounds that they failed properly to apply prosecution guidance, including its own guidance. In particular, the plea agreement reached failed to reflect the seriousness and extent of BAE's alleged offending, which included corruption and bribery, and to provide the court with adequate sentencing powers. In response, on 1 March, the High Court granted an injunction prohibiting the Director of the SFO from taking further steps in its plea bargain settlement. However, the judicial review request was rejected on 24 March.

In December 2010, Mr Justice Bean held a sentencing hearing at Southwark Crown Court. He was critical of the deal between the SFO and BAE and ruled that BAE was to pay a fine of £500,000 and make a further £29.5 million payment to the people of Tanzania. BAE delayed that payment, which was only transferred to the government of Tanzania on 15 March 2012, after severe criticism in the parliamentary International Development Committee.

=== UKTI Armed and Dangerous ===
United Kingdom Trade & Investment (UKTI) Defence & Security Organisation is the government's arms export promotion unit. It came into being on 1 April 2008 as a replacement for the Defence Export Services Organisation.

The Defence Export Services Organisation was an adjunct of the Ministry of Defence concerned with procuring contracts for private military companies to export arms to foreign governments. The closure of DESO had been a core campaigning aim of CAAT since its inception in 1974 and was the principal campaign in 2006, focusing on arms sales to countries with poor human rights records (in 2004, UK arms export licenses were granted to 13 of the 20 'major countries of concern' identified by the Foreign and Commonwealth Office in its 2005 Human Rights Annual Report). CAAT also alleged that DESO unfairly privileged the interests of arms companies and helped facilitate bribes to foreign officials. On 25 July 2007 Gordon Brown announced that DESO would be closed, a move condemned by Mike Turner, then Chief Executive of BAE Systems.

Since its inception, UKTI DSO has held a privileged position in UKTI, employing more civil servants (160) at London headquarters than UKTI employs for all other industry sectors combined (130). There is no economic justification for such support: arms sales account for just 1.2% of UK exports and sustain just 0.2% of the national labour force. UKTI DSO is responsible for organising and supporting UK participation in arms fairs overseas and in the UKTi, especially the bi-annual Defence Systems and Equipment International (DSEi) in London and Farnborough International Airshow. The head of UKTI DSO is Richard Paniguian CBE, a former BP executive. UKTI DSO is based at the Department of Business, Innovation and Skills (BIS) in Westminster and also has staff in overseas offices in priority market countries. CAAT has held a number of protest demonstrations outside their offices and has made many Freedom of Information requests to UKTI DSO on markets, meetings and arms fair activities.

=== Arms fairs ===
It has long campaigned against government support and participation in arms fairs, in the UK and elsewhere. Arms fairs promote weapons sales by giving arms dealers the chance to meet military delegations, government officials, other arms companies and suppliers, and interested individuals. The guest lists for arms fairs frequently include regimes who abuse human rights, and countries actively involved in armed conflicts.

Defence Systems and Equipment International DSEi is one of the largest arms fairs in the world. It is held at the ExCel Centre in London's docklands bi-annually. From 2003 to May 2008 it was organised by Reed Elsevier, a publishing and information company, who acquired the previous organisers Spearhead in 2003. CAAT campaigned to encourage Reed Elsevier to extricate itself from the arms industry. It directed a sustained and concerted effort from academics, doctors and writers who used the company's products, who demanded that Reed Elsevier end their involvement with arms fairs on ethical grounds. In June 2007 Reed's announced it was selling its arms fairs to Clarion Events, the sale completed in May 2008.

Since 2008 CAAT has campaigned against both UKTI DSO and Clarion Events' involvement in DSEi. In collaboration with Stop the Arms Fair coalition, they organised demonstrations against DSEi in 2009 and 2011 focusing its efforts in central London as security made it difficult to protest near ExCel. There have also been smaller demonstrations outside Clarion Events offices and trade fairs, including The Baby Show and Spirit of Christmas. Because Clarion is a private company it is not possible to organise shareholder opposition; instead the focus has been on making exhibitors and visitors aware of Clarion's arms trade connections.

The campaign has also tried to raise public awareness of the role of the Farnborough Airshow as an arms fair, owned and organised by the arms industry body Aerospace, Defence and Security (ADS).

=== Disarm the Gallery ===
The "Disarm the Gallery" campaign was launched by CAAT and the Stop the Arms Fair coalition in 2012. It aims to persuade the National Gallery to end the £30,000 annual sponsorship by Italian arms company Finmeccanica which has allowed the company to hold receptions for arms company executives attending arms fairs DSEi and Farnborough International. In October 2012, the Finmeccanica sponsorship was terminated, one year earlier than it had been due to expire.

=== Undercover controversies ===
British Aerospace paid a private intelligence company (Threat Response International) to spy on CAAT. Daily reports on activists' whereabouts were sent to Britain's largest arms dealer by Evelyn le Chêne, a woman with a well-known record in intelligence work.

=== Legal issues ===
The CAAT announced on 30 January 2023 that it was taking the British government to the High Court on charges that UK arms have contributed to breaching international humanitarian law, especially in the Saudi War in Yemen. "This is a government that cares more about profit than war crimes and the deaths of civilians," said Emily Apple, media coordinator at CAAT. "Its argument that these are 'isolated incidents' is total nonsense and deeply offensive to all the Yemeni people who've had their lives destroyed by UK weapons."

== Other issues ==
=== Clean investment ===
It has consistently sought to highlight public organizations (local councils, pension funds, charities, educational institutions, health bodies, religious organizations etc.) who hold shares in companies trading in arms and encourage them to disinvest. From 1995 to 2007 they researched and published annual reports on the arms company shareholdings of local authorities. In July 2007 they released research that 75 local authorities in the UK held such investments through their pension funds. It argued that many council employees did not want to invest in the arms industry and would prefer a more ethical investment strategy.

The Clean Investment campaign has had many successes. In 2001, after a campaign by the CAAT Christian Network, the Church of England redefined its investment criteria and confirmed it would no longer invest in arms companies. With its arms-free portfolio, the Church was judged in 2005 to be the second best performer of more than 1,000 funds over the previous decade.

The CAAT Universities Network has met with considerable success in its campaign for ethical investment in educational institutions. A 2007 report,'Study War No More', highlighted military funding and involvement in 26 British universities. CAAT supports student research into university investment portfolios which has helped students to mount their own campaigns for clean investment. As a result, many universities have disinvested their arms industry shares, while campaigns continue on other campuses for similar action to be taken.

The campaign no longer actively researches or publishes on Clean Investment. Instead it encourages supporters to gain information on public bodies through the Freedom of Information Act 2000 and to use this information to support disinvestment.

=== Corporate mercenaries ===
Since the invasion of Iraq in March 2003, the use of 'private military companies' has become standard practice for countries such as the UK and the US. The campaign considers these contractors to be modern-day corporate mercenaries, as defined by the Geneva Convention. Private military companies have become big business, with an estimated turnover worldwide of $100 billion in 2003, and their use is likely to rise in future conflicts. CAAT published a research paper on the issue in 1999. It seeks an end to all mercenary activities. If this cannot be achieved at this point, they believe that they should be strictly regulated and has collaborated with War on Want and other organisations to lobby the UK Foreign and Commonwealth Office to do so. In 2008, Labour Foreign Secretary David Miliband rejected a government licensing system and proposed regulation by a trade organisation. The coalition government accepted the Labour government's proposals and in March 2011 stated that ADS Group, representing over 2,000 companies in the aerospace, defence and space sectors, would oversee the regulation. CAAT does not believe this form of self-regulation to be strong or impartial.

== Structure and funding ==
The campaign's ultimate decision-making body is its steering committee, of elected and appointed members and staff members. It employs a small number of paid staff who are supported by a large number of volunteers, without whom the campaign would not be able to function. There is a network of local groups and contacts who play a vital role in communicating its message and strengthening its campaigns. There are two special interest networks – the Christian Network and the Universities Network. Supporters receive copies of CAATnews quarterly magazine, mailings and e-bulletins and are invited to attend an annual gathering, regional workshops and protests.

Individuals and supportive groups (local branches of peace organisations, trade unions, churches, etc.) donate around 80% of the running costs. As a campaigning organisation, it is unable to take advantage of many of the benefits open to charities, but makes applications for charitable funding to a small number of trusts and foundations for its research and educational work.

It is a member of the European Network Against Arms Trade (ENAAT) and works together with similar organisations in other countries.

== See also ==
- Arms Reduction Coalition
- Campaign for Nuclear Disarmament
- Control Arms Campaign
- IANSA (NGO)
- Small arms proliferation
- Stockholm International Peace Research Institute
- Stop the War Coalition
- War Resisters International
