= UK Defence and Security Exports =

Arms organisation in the United Kingdom

- Formation: 1966; 60 years ago
- Purpose: Export of British arms
- Parent organization: Department for Business and Trade

UK Defence and Security Exports (UKDSE), formerly known as Defence & Security Organisation (DSO) and the Defence Export Services Organisation (DESO), is an organisation within the Department for Business and Trade responsible for helping British arms companies export.

== History ==
The organisation was founded in 1966 by Denis Healey, the Secretary of State for Defence at the time. In January of that year he informed Parliament that "while the Government attach[es] the highest importance to making progress in the field of arms control and disarmament, we must also take what practical steps we can to ensure that this country does not fail to secure its rightful share of this valuable commercial market." Founded as the Defence Sales Organisation, the organisation was renamed the Defence Export Services Organisation in 1985.

On 26 July 2007 Gordon Brown announced that the DESO would be transferred to UK Trade & Investment from April 2008, and would be renamed to UKTI Defence and Security Group. Until the 2007 transfer, DESO was headed by executives of defence companies who were officially seconded from their employer and continue to receive their salary. A third of the DESO's 500 staff were involved in support of the Al Yamamah arms deal with Saudi Arabia.

In July 2020, the organisation was renamed UK Defence and Security Exports.

== Organisation ==
DESO had an overall operating budget for 2006/7 of £51.438 million, largely covered by income received from customer governments, leaving a residue of just under £16 million provided by the British Government. For 2006/2007 it identified its priority markets as Greece, India, Japan, Malaysia, Oman, Saudi Arabia and the United States.

As of 1 February 2007, it had 466 staff on its books. Nearly 400 are based in London with another 100 located in offices in 17 countries worldwide, including 65 based in Saudi Arabia. The DESO also works with military attachés based in around 80 UK embassies when necessary.

=== Leadership ===
- Oliver Harry, 2024- present
- Mark Goldsack, 2019- 2024
- Simon Everest, interim head, from 2017
- Stephen Phipson 2015 - 2017
- Richard Paniguian 2008 - 2015
- Alan Garwood, 2002 to 2007; seconded from MBDA (part-owned by BAE Systems, the UK's dominant arms producer)
- Tony Edwards, 1998 to 2002; seconded from TI Group
- Charles Masefield, 1994 to 1998; seconded from Avro and Airbus (part-owned by British Aerospace); returned to GEC and BAE Systems
- Alan Thomas, 1989 to 1994; seconded from Raytheon
- Colin Chandler, 1985 to 1989; seconded from British Aerospace; returned to Siemens Plessey, the TI Group, Racal and Vickers

== Strategic market analysis ==
Each year, DESO carries out a 'Strategic Market Analysis' which provides world and regional market overviews as well as more detailed analysis of key country markets. According to its website, "Successive Customer Satisfaction Surveys of the UK defence industry revealed that over 75% of [arms export orders] would not have been achieved without the assistance of DESO".

== Involvement in arms fairs ==
Since 1998, DESO has represented the Ministry of Defence in support of the UK Defence Industry at an average of 12 overseas arms fairs a year. In addition to its international marketing campaign DESO helps organise the UK's two main arms fairs, Defence Systems and Equipment International (DSEi), and Farnborough Airshow, which take place in alternate years. DESO is responsible for providing marketing support to these events, including arranging visits by foreign delegations.

Overseas arms fairs supported by DESO historically include the Africa Aerospace and Defence Expo, the Special Operations Forces Exhibition in Jordan, and Dubai Airshow.

== Opposition ==
The Liberal Democrats, Plaid Cymru and the Green Party of England and Wales as well as around 30 NGOs have signed a statement calling for DESO's closure. They allege that not enough concern is given to the impact of arms sales on human rights, development or conflict. For instance, in 2004, UK arms export licenses were granted to 13 of the 20 'major countries of concern' identified by the Foreign and Commonwealth Office in its 2005 Human Rights Annual Report. (See Foreign and Commonwealth Office, Human Rights Annual Report 2005.)

In 2007, three campaigning groups - CAAT, the SPEAK Network and Fellowship of Reconciliation - organised campaigns for DESO to be shut down. On 26 July 2007 Gordon Brown announced that DESO would be closed.
