= Control Arms Campaign =

The Control Arms Campaign is jointly run by a coalition of over 100 organisations including Amnesty International, IANSA, Oxfam International and Saferworld.

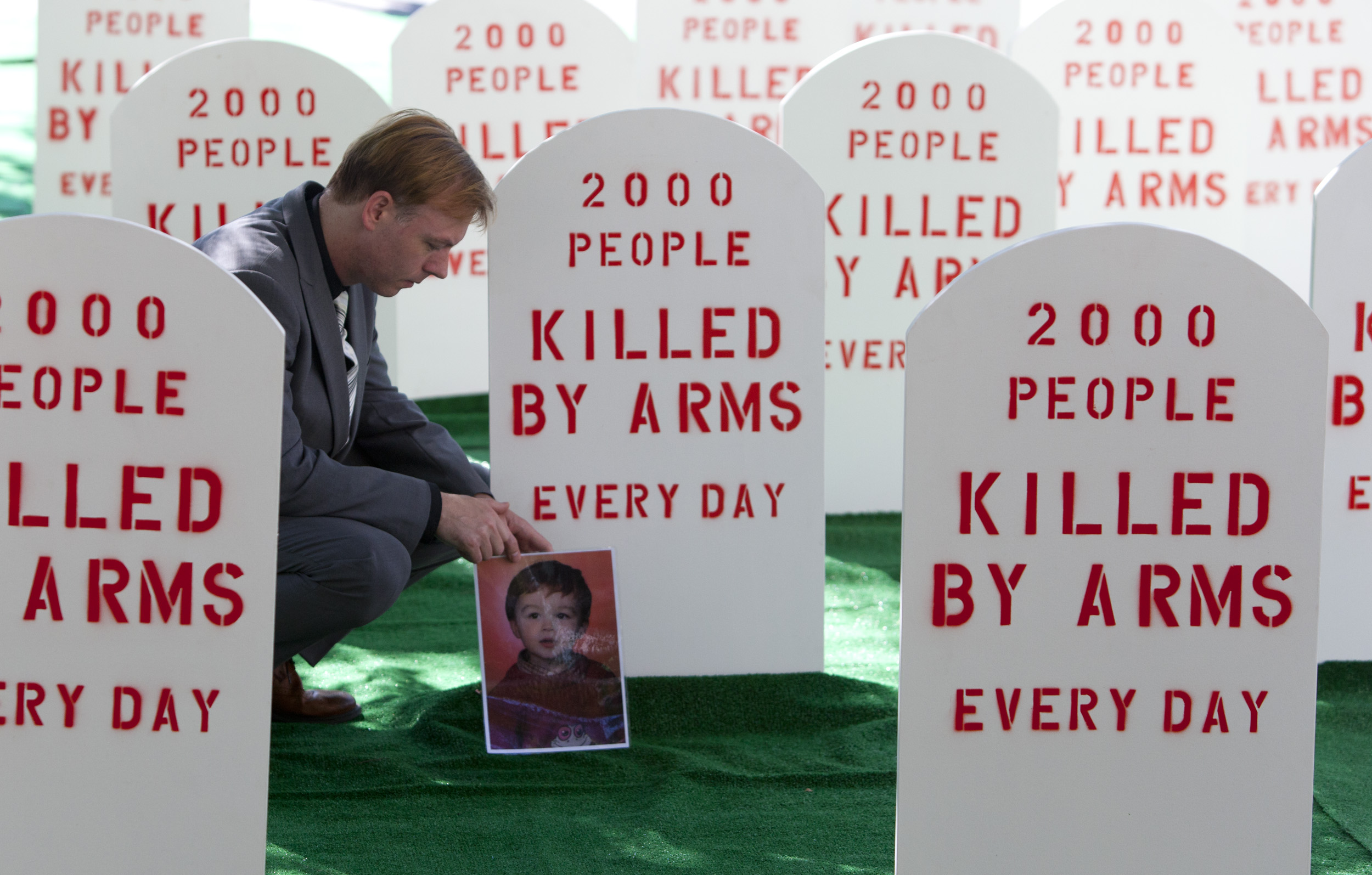
A Control Arms campaigner with a picture of his son at a media stunt in New York.

The campaign has been active since 2003 in calling for an international Arms Trade Treaty (ATT). The campaign began due to the lack of regulation in the international trade in arms. Control Arms has argued that the lack of controls on the arms trade is fuelling armed conflict, poverty and human rights abuses worldwide. Even though existing treaties and pieces of international law exist that focus on the international arms trade, none of them, before the Arms Trade Treaty, were legally binding and fully international.

Since 2003 it has used a range of tactics to get its message across, including publicity stunts, mass public actions, petitions including the Million Faces campaign, worldwide public consultations, policy publications and the lobbying of politicians and diplomats across the world.

The process towards creating an international Arms Trade Treaty began in the United Nations in 2006. On April 2, 2013 the UN General Assembly voted overwhelmingly to adopt an international Arms Trade Treaty.

== History ==
The Arms Trade Treaty began as an idea in an NGO meeting in the 1990s. At the end of the decade, after successfully lobbying to bring about the EU Code of Conduct on Arms Exporters, civil society groups worked with a group of Nobel Peace Prize Laureates to draft proposals for the regulation of the international arms trade. In 2001, they began to circulate a "Draft Framework Convention on International Arms Transfers" and sought the support of governments around the world.

In 2003, the Control Arms campaign began, campaigning for an international ATT in more than one hundred countries. One of the main elements of the early campaign was the 'Million Faces' petition. The petition brought together people from around the world who had suffered from armed conflict and armed violence as well as other supporters. The petition reached its goal in 2006, and the petition was presented to UN Secretary-General Kofi Annan by 'Millionth Face' Julius Arile, from Kenya.

In 2006, UN Members voted to consider states' views on a potential Treaty and convene an expert group, with only the United States against. Alongside this consultation Control Arms conducted a parallel 'People's Consultation', holding events in over one hundred countries. The intention was to use ordinary people's voices to influence government's responses to the UN consultation. Whereas similar consultations usually result in ten to fifteen responses, when the UN Secretary-General presented the findings in 2007, the ATT consultation had received over one hundred.

By 2009 the UN voted overwhelmingly in favour of convening negotiations on an ATT, with Zimbabwe the only vote against. States finally met In 2012 and 2013 to negotiate an ATT, all the while receiving significant input from civil society groups including Control Arms. On April 2, 2013, despite the objections of North Korea, Iran and Syria, the UN General Assembly voted overwhelmingly to support the ATT, in a 156-3-22 vote. The ATT has been open for signature since June 3, 2013.

=== Activities during the UN process ===
Throughout the Arms Trade Treaty process, Control Arms worked closely with supportive governments in their campaign for a strong ATT. The campaign has maintained close relations with the co-authors of the original Resolution in 2006 - Argentina, Australia, Costa Rica, Finland, Japan, Kenya and the United Kingdom - as well as working closely with other supportive governments.

The campaign, with teams focusing on legal and policy issues, has also provided expertise and support to states with limited resources at the United Nations.

In turn, members of Control Arms have also been members of delegations during the process, including with Finland, Mexico, New Zealand, Norway, Palau and the Solomon Islands.

Control Arms have had a presence at all major meetings on the Arms Trade Treaty. In particular, representatives of the campaign participated in both UN negotiating conferences in July 2012 and March 2013, including making presentations on the views of civil society during plenary sessions.

As part of the ongoing process, the campaign organised petitions and other activities to engage the public with the campaign, culminating in a global call to "Speak Out" to get states to support a strong Arms Trade Treaty.

Control Arms, alongside Reaching Critical Will, also operated a website tracking states' positions on the Arms Trade Treaty. Since April 2013, it also holds a record of states' votes for the final Resolution adopting the ATT, as well as a record of state signatures and ratifications.

=== Success ===
The main aim of the Control Arms campaign, achieving an international Arms Trade Treaty, was effectively met on April 2, 2013 when the United Nations voted to adopt the text agreed at the negotiating conference the previous month.

The Treaty had been the work of a concerted campaign over the course of more than a decade, and is particularly noteworthy given the speed in which it was agreed, and that it was agreed through the UN system. The UN Conference on Disarmament has been at a stalemate for over 16 years. Comparative treaties, such as the Mine Ban Treaty and the Convention on Cluster Munitions, have had to find agreement outside the UN process.

As an indication of the centrality of civil society groups including Control Arms to the success of the process, a number of states, the UN Secretary-General Ban Ki-moon, and the President of the final negotiating conference all praised civil society for their contributions. Ban Ki-moon said that he commended "the members of civil society for their tireless campaigns, expert contributions and unwavering support". In a statement given whilst signing the Arms Trade Treaty as Australian Ambassador to the UN, the President of the final conference, Peter Woolcott, said that "[s]tates did not do this alone. It is important we recognize the enormous contribution of civil society who have been advocating for this Treaty for many years, who informed our negotiations and who have an important role in the years ahead".

== Future of the campaign ==
Although the main goal of the Control Arms campaign has been achieved – agreement to adopt an international Arms Trade Treaty – the campaign will continue to be involved in the Arms Trade Treaty process. Currently, Control Arms is pushing members to ask their state to sign the Arms Trade Treaty as soon as possible.

In the future, the campaign will seek to monitor states' compliance with the Arms Trade Treaty, and push for states to ensure strong and consistent application of the Treaty.

== See also ==
- Arms Control Association
- Arms Reduction Coalition
- Campaign Against Arms Trade
- Center for Arms Control and Non-Proliferation
- Council for a Livable World
- Small arms proliferation
