= Kinshasa Convention =

Regulation of small arms and light weapons

Central African Convention for the Control of Small Arms and Light Weapons, their Ammunition and all Parts and Components that can be used for their Manufacture, Repair and Assembly
Signed and ratified	Only signed
- Signed: 19 November 2010
- Location: Brazzaville, Republic of the Congo
- Effective: 8 March 2017
- Condition: Ratification by 7 states
- Signatories: 11
- Parties: 8 (Complete List)
- Depositary: UN Secretary-General
- Languages: English, French and Spanish

Full text
- Central African Convention for the Control of Small Arms and Light Weapons, their Ammunition, Parts and Components that can be used for their Manufacture, Repair and Assembly at Wikisource

The Central African Convention for the Control of Small Arms and Light Weapons, their Ammunition and all Parts and Components that can be used for their Manufacture, Repair and Assembly, also known as the Kinshasa Convention, aims at regulating small arms and light weapons (SALW) and combating their illicit trade and trafficking in Central Africa.

The convention was negotiated within the framework of the UN Standing Advisory Committee on Security Questions in Central Africa (UNSAC), and unanimously adopted on 30 April 2010 in Kinshasa, Democratic Republic of the Congo, at the 30th ministerial meeting of the Committee. As of August 2022, Angola, Cameroon, the Central African Republic, Chad, Equatorial Guinea, Gabon, Republic of the Congo and São Tomé and Príncipe have ratified the Convention. The convention entered into force on 8 March 2017, following the deposit of the sixth instrument of ratification by Angola.

== Purpose of the convention ==
The purpose of the Kinshasa Convention, as stated in Chapter I, Article 1, is to:

- Prevent, combat and eradicate, in Central Africa, the illicit trade and trafficking in small arms and light weapons, their ammunition and all parts and components that can be used for their manufacture, repair and assembly;
- Strengthen the control, in Central Africa, of the manufacture, trade, movement, transfer, possession and use of small arms and light weapons, their ammunition and all parts and components that can be used for their manufacture, repair and assembly;
- Combat armed violence and ease the human suffering caused in Central Africa by the illicit trade and trafficking in small arms and light weapons, their ammunition and all parts and components that can be used for their manufacture, repair and assembly;
- Foster cooperation and confidence among States Parties and cooperation and dialogue among Governments and civil society organizations.

== Area of application ==
"Central Africa" refers to the geographical area covering the 11 states that are members of the United Nations Standing Advisory Committee on Security Questions in Central Africa, namely, the Republic of Angola, the Republic of Burundi, the Republic of Cameroon, the Central African Republic, the Republic of Chad, the Republic of the Congo, the Democratic Republic of the Congo, the Republic of Equatorial Guinea, the Gabonese Republic, the Republic of Rwanda and the Democratic Republic of Sao Tomé and Principe.

== History ==
The United Nations Standing Advisory Committee on Security Questions in Central Africa (UNSAC) was established by the Secretary-General of the United Nations on 28 May 1992, pursuant to General Assembly resolution 46/37 B of 6 December 1991. Its primary objective is to promote peace and security in Central Africa through confidence-building measures, notably in the fields of disarmament and arms limitation. UNSAC comprises the ten member States of the Economic Community of Central African States (ECCAS) and the Republic of Rwanda.

In his statement opening the 25th ministerial meeting of UNSAC, in May 2007, the President of São Tomé and Príncipe invited the Committee to support the elaboration of a subregional legally binding instrument on illicit SALW and its accompanying implementation plan, in order to strengthen the capacity of Central African States to combat illicit small arms and light weapons and their governance of the security sector, as well as a Code of Conduct for the Defense and Security Forces in Central Africa. This proposal became known as the São Tomé Initiative.

The Central African Convention for the Control of Small Arms and Light Weapons, their Ammunition, Parts and Components that can be used for their Manufacture, Repair or Assembly, dubbed Kinshasa Convention, was unanimously adopted on 30 April 2010 by all eleven member States of UNSAC at its 30th ministerial meeting held in Kinshasa, Democratic Republic of the Congo.

The Convention was opened for signature on 19 November 2010 in the context of UNSAC's 31st ministerial meeting held in Brazzaville, Republic of the Congo. Eight of the eleven UNSAC members States signed the Convention on this occasion; Burundi, Equatorial Guinea and Rwanda signed it shortly thereafter. The Convention Implementation Plan, which was developed alongside the Convention to ensure the feasibility of the implementation process, was adopted at this occasion.

Following the ratification of the Convention by Angola on 6 February 2017, the sixth such instrument of ratification, the Kinshasa Convention entered into force on 8 March 2017.

== Analysis ==
The Kinshasa Convention is the most recent small arms control and disarmament legal instrument elaborated within the United Nations framework.

This Convention, which addresses the security, legal, institutional and cultural specificities of the Central African subregion, demonstrates the eleven UNSAC countries' willingness to establish a coherent subregional strategy to act collectively against illicit arms and ammunition. The mobilization of the eleven Central African countries to negotiate this arms control and disarmament instrument contributes also to a significant confidence-building measure amongst countries, the majority of which had been at war with each other.

The Convention's scope is broad and takes into account the most recent developments in global and regional initiatives aimed at combating illicit small arms and light weapons. The Convention also draws upon the best practices and experience of the African and other regions. Its elaboration process was also unique to the extent that both the Convention and its implementation plan were carried out in parallel, with a view to ensuring a "reality check" at the conclusion of various legal provisions implying obligations for States to carry out specific measures.

The Ministers' direct involvement in the elaboration of the Kinshasa Convention and its adoption strengthens the importance of the Convention and constitutes a significant step towards a subregional coherent strategy to act against illicit arms and ammunition. The conclusion of such a significant and complex legal instrument in such a short period of time is a significant demonstration of the subregion's determination to tackle one of its biggest challenges.

This Convention fills a void as Central Africa was one of the African subregions not to have its own legal instrument for the control of small arms and light weapons.

== Structure of the convention ==
Note: This section summarizes the articles of the Kinshasa Convention. For more information, see the full text of the Convention.

CHAPTER I: PURPOSE AND DEFINITIONS
- ARTICLE 1: PURPOSE

Outlines the purpose of the Convention.

- ARTICLE 2: DEFINITIONS

Defines a wide range of technical terms used the Convention, including small arms and light weapons, licit and illicit activities or non-State armed groups.

CHAPTER II: TRANSFERS
- ARTICLE 3: AUTHORIZATION OF TRANSFERS TO STATES

Authorizes the transfer of small arms and light weapons to, through and from States for law and order, national security and peacekeeping operations.

- ARTICLE 4: PROHIBITION OF TRANSFERS TO NON-STATE ARMED GROUPS

Prohibits the transfer of small arms and light weapons to, through and from State territories to non-State armed groups.

- ARTICLE 5: PROCEDURE AND CONDITIONS FOR THE ISSUANCE OF TRANSFER AUTHORIZATIONS

Requires States to set up and maintain a system of authorizations for transfers of small arms and light weapons to public and private actors and sets standards for required information and limits to transfers.

- ARTICLE 6: END-USER CERTIFICATE

Requires States to set up a system of end-user certificates.

CHAPTER III: POSSESSION BY CIVILIANS
- ARTICLE 7: PROHIBITION OF THE POSSESSION OF LIGHT WEAPONS BY CIVILIANS

Requires States to prohibit and penalize the possession of small arms by civilians.

- ARTICLE 8: AUTHORIZATION OF THE POSSESSION OF SMALL ARMS BY CIVILIANS

Requires States to determine the conditions for authorization of possession, carrying, use and trade of certain light weapons by civilians and provides minimum requirements for accompanying licences.

- ARTICLE 9: MEASURES FOR CONTROL OF THE POSSESSION OF SMALL ARMS BY CIVILIANS

Requires States to determine procedures for the granting and removing of licences, penalties in case of violations and to set up a national and subregional database of licences.

- ARTICLE 10: VISITOR’S CERTIFICATE

Requires States to set in place a visitor's certificate regulating the import and transit of light weapons and their ammunition through their territory.

CHAPTER IV: MANUFACTURE, DISTRIBUTION AND REPAIR
- ARTICLE 11: AUTHORIZATION FOR MANUFACTURE, DISTRIBUTION AND REPAIR

Requires States to subject manufacture and home production of small arms and light weapons to the possession of licences and sets minimum conditions for their obtainment.

- ARTICLE 12: MEASURES FOR THE CONTROL OF MANUFACTURE, DISTRIBUTION, REPAIR AND ENFORCEMENT

Requires States to ensure the proper marking, management, monitoring and inspection of small arms and light weapons by licensed manufacturers, distributors and repairers.

CHAPTER V: OPERATIONAL PROCEDURES
- ARTICLE 13: BROKERING

Requires States to submit brokers and their financial and shipping agents to registration regardless of their nationality and regulate and trace their activities. Brokers should be registered in their country of origin and residence.

- ARTICLE 14: MARKING AND TRACING

Requires States to ensure the marking of all small arms and light weapons and their components and ammunition on their territory with a unique identifier for which it sets baseline conditions.

- ARTICLE 15: REGISTRATION, COLLECTION AND DESTRUCTION

Requires States to inspect and evaluate its stockpiles and collect, seize, register and destroy small arms and light weapons that are surplus, obsolete or illicit.

- ARTICLE 16: MANAGEMENT AND SECURITY OF STOCKPILES

Requires States to maintain the security of depots and stockpiles and inventory small arms and light weapons in the possession of armed and security forces.

- ARTICLE 17: BORDER CONTROL

Requires States to strengthen border control and customs administrations and bolster their cooperation in this area.

- ARTICLE 18: POINTS OF ENTRY OF SMALL ARMS AND LIGHT WEAPONS

Requires States to determine and secure the mode of transport and points of entry and exit for small arms and light weapons.

- ARTICLE 19: EDUCATION AND AWARENESS PROGRAMMES

States Parties undertake to develop public and community education and awareness programmes.

CHAPTER VI: TRANSPARENCY AND EXCHANGE OF INFORMATION
- ARTICLE 20: NATIONAL ELECTRONIC DATABASE

Requires States to set up and maintain an electronic and paper centralized database of all small arms, light weapons, ammunition and parts imported or locally manufactured.

- ARTICLE 21: SUBREGIONAL ELECTRONIC DATABASE

Requires the Secretary-General of ECCAS to set up and maintain an electronic and paper database of all small arms, light weapons, ammunition and parts transfers in the subregion.

- ARTICLE 22: SUBREGIONAL ELECTRONIC DATABASE OF WEAPONS USED IN PEACEKEEPING OPERATIONS

Requires the Secretary-General of ECCAS to set up and maintain an electronic and paper database of all small arms, light weapons, ammunition and parts intended for use in peacekeeping operations.

- ARTICLE 23: DIALOGUE WITH INTERNATIONAL MANUFACTURERS AND INTERNATIONAL ORGANIZATIONS

Requires States to communicate with arms producers with a view to the exchange of information and the strengthening of the implementation of the Convention.

- ARTICLE 24: CONFIDENCE-BUILDING

Requires States to engage in confidence building measures including the establishment of a system of judicial cooperation and information and data exchange.

CHAPTER VII: HARMONIZATION OF NATIONAL LEGISLATION
- ARTICLE 25: ADOPTION AND HARMONIZATION OF LEGISLATIVE PROVISIONS

States undertake to revise, update and harmonize their legislation to bring it in line with the provisions of the Convention and penalize practices there-by considered illicit.

- ARTICLE 26: CAMPAIGN AGAINST CORRUPTION AND OTHER FORMS OF CRIMINALITY

Requires States to establish and strengthen cooperation in the fight against corruption, money-laundering, terrorism and drug trafficking.

CHAPTER VIII: INSTITUTIONAL ARRANGEMENTS AND IMPLEMENTATION
- ARTICLE 27: NATIONAL FOCAL POINTS

Requires States to appoint a National Focal Point on small arms and light weapons who shall also serve as the permanent secretary or chairperson of the national commission.

- ARTICLE 28: NATIONAL COMMISSIONS

Requires States to establish a national commission to serve as the coordinating body for the action taken by the State on the matter of small arms and light weapons.

- ARTICLE 29: THE SECRETARY-GENERAL OF ECCAS

The Secretary General of ECCAS shall ensure the follow-up and coordination of all subregional activities linked to the illicit trade and trafficking in small arms and light weapons.

- ARTICLE 30: NATIONAL ACTION PLANS

Requires States to prepare national action plans to be implemented by the States' national commissions.

- ARTICLE 31: SUBREGIONAL ACTION PLAN

The Secretary General of ECCAS shall prepare a subregional action plan describing all subregional actions taken against the illicit trade and trafficking of small arms and light weapons.

- ARTICLE 32: FINANCIAL SUPPORT

State undertake to financially support the implementation of the Convention and the establishment of a group of experts responsible for follow-up and appraisal of the implementation of activities.

- ARTICLE 33: ASSISTANCE AND COOPERATION

States undertake to promote cooperation among States and the competent government bodies.

- ARTICLE 34: FOLLOW-UP AND APPRAISAL

States shall submit an annual report to the Secretary-General of ECCAS on the implementation of the Convention. One year after the entry into for of the Convention, the Secretary-General of the United Nations shall convene a Conference of States Parties; five year after the entry into force, the Secretary-General of the United Nations shall organize a review conference.

CHAPTER IX: GENERAL AND FINAL PROVISIONS
- ARTICLE 35: SIGNATURE, RATIFICATION, ACCEPTANCE, APPROVAL AND ACCESSION

The Convention is open for signature in Brazzaville on 19 November 2010 and subsequently at United Nations Headquarters in New York. Other States than the ones mentioned may accede to this Convention, subject to the approval of the Conference of States Parties.

- ARTICLE 36: ENTRY INTO FORCE

The Convention shall enter into force thirty days after the date of deposit of the sixth instrument of ratification, acceptance, approval or accession.

- ARTICLE 37: AMENDMENTS

Any State Party may propose amendments which shall be adopted by consensus at the Conference of State Parties.

- ARTICLE 38: RESERVATIONS

The articles of the Convention are not subject to reservations.

- ARTICLE 39: DENUNCIATION AND WITHDRAWAL

States parties have the right to withdrawal which shall not take effect until 12 months after the depositary received the withdrawal instrument.

- ARTICLE 40: DEPOSITARY AND LANGUAGES

The Secretary-General of the United Nations is the depositary of the Convention, of which the English, French and Spanish texts are equally authentic.

- ARTICLE 41: SPECIAL PROVISIONS

Requires States to seek a peaceful settlement of disputes.

== Signature and ratification ==
Country	Signature	Ratification
Republic of Angola	19 Nov 2010	6 Feb 2017
Republic of Burundi	22 Sept 2011	
Republic of Cameroon	19 Nov 2010	30 Jan 2015
Central African Republic	19 Nov 2010	24 Oct 2012
Republic of Chad	19 Nov 2010	8 Aug 2012
Republic of the Congo	19 Nov 2010	5 Dec 2012
the Democratic Republic of the Congo	19 Nov 2010	
Republic of Equatorial Guinea	29 Apr 2011	24 Dec 2019
Gabonese Republic	19 Nov 2010	25 Sep 2012
Republic of Rwanda	1 Aug 2011	
Democratic Republic of São Tomé and Príncipe	19 Nov 2010	23 Mar 2017

As of 31 August 2022, all eleven Central African States have signed the Kinshasa Convention. Angola, Cameroon, the Central African Republic, Chad, the Republic of the Congo, Equatorial Guinea, Gabon and São Tomé and Príncipe have ratified it. The Kinshasa Convention entered into force on 8 March 2017

== Related regional and subregional documents ==
Document	Signature	Entry into force
The Bamako Declaration on an African Common Position on the Illicit Proliferation, Circulation and Trafficking of Small Arms and Light Weapons	1 December 2000	N/A
The Nairobi Declaration on the Problem of the Proliferation of Illicit Small Arms and Light Weapons in the Great Lakes Region	15 March 2000	N/A
The Nairobi Protocol for the Prevention, Control and Reduction of Small Arms and Light Weapons in the Great Lakes Region and the Horn of Africa	21 April 2004	5 May 2006
The ECOWAS Convention on Small Arms and Light Weapons, their Ammunition and other Related Materials	14 June 2006	29 September 2009
The Southern African Development Community (SADC) Protocol on Control of Firearms, Ammunition and other related materials	14 August 2001	8 November 2004
