= Battle of Burp Gun Corner =

- Part of Operation Varsity
Date	24 March 1945 – 25 March 1945 (1 day)
Location	A crossroads near Wesel, Germany
Result	Allied victory

Belligerents
United States	Germany

Units involved
United States: 435th Troop Carrier Group	(Nazi Germany) Germany: Various Folkksturm and Wehrmacht units

Strength
40 glider troops	~200 men; 2 tanks

Casualties and losses
(United States) American: 31 casualties	(Nazi Germany) German: ~15 killed; ~15 wounded; ~50 captured

The Battle of Burp Gun Corner was an engagement between soldiers of the U.S. 435th Troop Carrier Group and the Wehrmacht. The battle took place at a small crossroads near Wesel, Germany, from March 24–25, 1945. The engagement was part of Operation Varsity.

== Background ==
See Operation Varsity

== Landing ==
The U.S. glider troops landed on Landing Zone "S" and faced heavy German sniper and mortar fire. They then moved to their assigned area, a crossroads that would become known as "Burp Gun Corner" (specifically, the crossroads of Holzweg and Hessenweg). The Americans cleared several houses and took a large number of prisoners before digging in for the night.

== Battle ==
Around midnight on March 24, a force of approximately 200 German infantry, supported by two tanks, a self-propelled artillery piece, and two 20mm flak guns, attempted to break through the American lines. This attack was aimed at a gap between the 2nd and 3rd battalions of the 194th.

The 77th Platoon of the 435th held their fire until the German force was very close. Flight Officer Elbert Jella fired a bazooka, hitting a German Panzer IV and causing it to reverse, destroying one of the flak guns in the process. The glider pilots, using their small arms, repelled the German assault.

== Aftermath ==
The glider pilots successfully defeated several smaller German counterattacks throughout the early morning hours of March 25. At daybreak, they linked up with British forces coming out of Wesel.
