= Small Arms Working Group =

Anti-small arms proliferation group

The Small Arms Working Group (SAWG) is an alliance of US-based non-governmental groups which promote change of national and international policies on small arms. Members agree that small arms proliferation must be countered by responsible legal domestic sales and foreign cooperation in reducing illicit arms trafficking. Participation is open to any organization that supports its objectives.

== See also ==
- Small Arms and Light Weapons
