= Preparatory Committees for an Arms Trade Treaty =

The Preparatory Committees for an Arms Trade Treaty, commonly known as PrepComs, were the United Nations developmental committees for the Arms Trade Treaty. There were 4 PrepComs from 2010 to 2012, all tasked with researching and preparing recommendations for the negotiation of the Arms Trade Treaty. They presented their final report to the UN Conference on the Arms Trade Treaty in July 2012.

== Background ==
Countries in the United Nations have long been concerned about the lack of a global normative framework for guiding and governing international arms transfers. After years of international campaigning from individuals and states, the United Nations General Assembly voted in 2006 to negotiate an Arms Trade Treaty.

When delegates of the United Nations decided that they would negotiate an Arms Trade Treaty in 2012, there emerged a sentiment to host a series of preparatory conferences for member states and civil society to arrange and organize the eventual negotiations. In order to do this, four preparatory committees were scheduled.

== Sittings ==
Four PrepComs sat in the period before negotiations began in 2012. All four were chaired by Argentinian Ambassador Roberto García Moritán, and held in the United Nations Building in New York City.

| Sitting | Date | References |
|---|---|---|
| 1st Preparatory Committee | 12–23 July 2010 | |
| 2nd Preparatory Committee | 28 February–4 March 2011 | |
| 3rd Preparatory Committee | 11–15 July 2011 | |
| 4th Preparatory Committee | 13–17 February 2012 | |

== Outcomes ==
The final report of the PrepComs was published on 7 March 2012, and presented to the Conference on the Arms Trade Treaty from 2 to 27 July the same year.

The Arms Trade Treaty was adopted by the General Assembly on 2 April 2013 by a 154–3 vote, with 23 abstentions. It was opened for formal signature by all states in New York on 3 June 2013, and entered into force on 24 December 2014, 90 days after the date of the 50th ratification.

== See also ==
- Disarmament
- Mine action
- Small Arms and Light Weapons (SALW)
