= Sport for Food =

Nonprofit organisation

Sport For Food is a United Kingdom based non-profit organization centered on utilizing sporting tournaments as a vehicle to support local food banks. The organization is the parent company of both Canada's Five Hole for Food, and the UK's own Footy For Food. Sport for Food was founded by Richard Loat after the success of Five Hole for Food, with Loat believing sport could generally be used as a tool to drive social impact across the globe. Sport for Food states that their mission is to "tackle hunger across the world using grass-roots, street sports as a vehicle for social change that transcends borders, languages, and distance, bringing fans together." At the end of 2013, SFF was accepted into UK Trade & Investment's Sirius Programme Startup Accelerator, and is based out of The Bakery Foundation in London.

== Sub-organizations ==
Sport For Food has two active sub-organizations and a third soon to launch.

=== Five Hole For Food ===
Five Hole for Food is the Canadian branch and originator of the SFF concept. Started in 2010, FHFF still runs yearly to this day, and has raised over 500,000 lbs of food for local food banks across Canada.

=== Footy For Food ===
Footy for Food is the UK and Europe-wide branch of the SFF and Five Hole For Food concept. Footy For Food executed its first tour of the U.K. in June 2014.
