= Prepcom =

Prepcom is an acronym for Preparatory Committee and may refer to:

- Preparatory Committee for an Arms Trade Treaty
- Comprehensive Nuclear-Test-Ban Treaty Organization Preparatory Commission
