= Symon Hill =

British Christian activist

Symon Hill is a left-wing Christian activist and writer. He has worked as campaigns manager at the Peace Pledge Union since 2016. He also teaches history for the Workers' Educational Association. His most recent book is The Upside-down Bible: What Jesus really said about money, sex and violence, published in 2015.

== Biography ==
Symon Hill was one of a group of Christian pacifists, supported by the former Archbishop of Canterbury Rowan Williams, who were arrested at the DSEI arms fair in London in 2013.

Hill was one of the organisers of the Christian "Ring of Prayer" at the eviction of Occupy London Stock Exchange in 2012.

He was associate director of the left-wing Christian think tank Ekklesia until 2013 and continues as an Ekklesia associate. As of 2024, he is training to be a Baptist minister.

In the summer of 2011, Hill went on a pilgrimage of repentance for homophobia, walking from Birmingham to London, attracting widespread media attention. Hill read theology at Westminster College, Oxford.

Hill was formerly media spokesperson for the Campaign Against Arms Trade (CAAT). He represented CAAT in the media when they took the British Government to court in 2007–08 over the cancellation of a Serious Fraud Office investigation into BAE Systems arms deals with Saudi Arabia. As a result, comedian Mark Thomas nominated him as a Hero of 2007 in The Independent on Sunday.

Hill received media attention when, in the wake of the death of Queen Elizabeth II, he was arrested in Oxford for making anti-monarchist remarks.

== Writing ==
Hill writes mainly on the issues of disarmament, public activism, sexuality, and the role of religion in society. His comment pieces have appeared in newspapers including the Sunday Herald, the Morning Star and the Daily Mail. He contributes to The Guardian's Comment is Free and to The Friend.

== Books ==
In addition to The Upside-Down Bible (ISBN 9780232532074), he has written two other books: The No-Nonsense Guide to Religion (ISBN 9781906523299) which was published by New Internationalist magazine in March 2010 as part of its No-Nonsense Guides series, and a book on on-line activism called Digital Revolutions: Activism in the age of the internet (ISBN 9781780260761) which was published by New Internationalist in April 2013.
