= Footy for Food =

Footy for Food is a United Kingdom based non-profit organization centered on utilizing football tournaments as a vehicle to support local food banks. The organization is a sister company of Canada's Five Hole for Food, which was founded in 2010 by Richard Loat and is recognized by Food Banks of Canada as an "organizational friend", that "provide[s] partnership assistance, beyond the categories of funds, food, and transportation or other services." Footy for Food states that their mission is to "prove that a generation hungry for change, an engaged corporate community and a national pastime are the perfect formula for changing the face of fundraising and community impact." Footy for Food is a child organization of Sport for Food.
