= Simon Barrow =

British theologian

Simon Barrow is a practical theologian, author, commentator, journalist, NGO consultant, adult educator and trainer, who was director of the religion and society think tank Ekklesia. He was assistant general secretary of Churches Together in Britain and Ireland (2000-2005).

He has been the national secretary of the Scottish National Party Trade Union Group. He is also co-founder and chair of the Scottish Football Supporters Association.

== Bibliography ==
- Consuming Passion: Why the Killing of Jesus Really Matters, co-edited with Jonathan Bartley (2005)
- "Religion and New Media: Changing the Story", chapter in Religion and the News (2013)
- "Circling the Square: Moving between Practical Politics and Eschatological Performance" (2015), doi:10.1558/poth.v3i2.197
- Scotland 2021, co-edited with Mike Small (2016)
- Feast or Famine? How the Gospel Challenges Austerity, co-written (2017)
- A Nation Changed?: The SNP and Scotland Ten Years On, co-edited with Gerry Hassan (2017)
- Solid Mental Grace: Listening to the Music of Yes (2018)
- Scotland After the Virus, co-edited with Gerry Hassan (2020)
- A Better Nation: The Challenges of Scottish Independence, co-edited with Gerry Hassan (2022)
- Britain Needs Change: The Politics of Hope and Labour's Challenge, co-edited with Gerry Hassan (2024)
- Yes in the 1990s (2025, forthcoming)
- Transfiguring the Everyday: The Musical Vision of Michael Tippett (2025, forthcoming)
