= UK arms export =

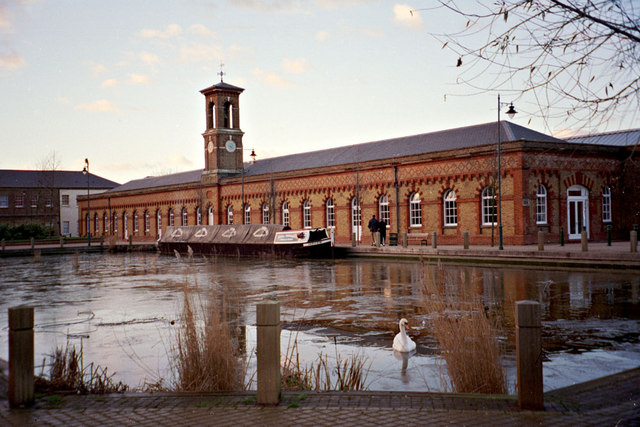
The Royal Small Arms Factory in London, closed in 1988.

UK arms export refers to trades of UK-made weapons around the world. The country is one of the world’s most successful arms exporters. According to the analysis by Action on Armed Violence, Military arms deals have been prepared £39bn between 2008 and 2017.

According to the Campaign Against Arms Trade (CAAT), the UK mostly has exported arms to United States, India, France, Germany, Italy, Oman, South Africa, Turkey, South Korea, Israel, the United Arab Emirates and Saudi Arabia.

== History ==
UK Trade and Investment reveals that "The UK is one of the world's most successful defence exporters, averaging second place in the global rankings on a rolling ten-year basis, making it Europe's leading defence exporter in the period". Also, the UK is known as the most robust export control government in the world. Every application is considered on a case-by-case basis against the Consolidated EU and National Arms Export Licensing Criteria. It is proctored, as reported by a spokesman for the Department for International Trade.

According to the analysis by Action on Armed Violence, military arms deals have been prepared £39bn between 2008 and 2017, £12bn of which belongs to states included on the Foreign and Commonwealth Office human rights “priority countries” list. The analysis of the figures, collated by the Campaign Against the Arms Trade using export control data from the Department for International Trade is indicating a growing trend. As CAAT mentioned, It is probable to be “conservative estimate” because of an opaque system of “open” licenses that allow an unlimited number for exporting, but less scrutiny of “open” licenses has been denied by the DIT. In 2016, 5,782 export licenses for military items in countries of concern which provide £1.5bn was reported.

== British sales worldwide ==
The Audit of the Government’s Annual Report on Strategic Export Controls reported that the UK-made arms were exported to 159 countries in 2000. Since 2010, UK-made arms have been sold or transferred indirectly to 51 countries, most of which are located in Middle East. Statistics collected by UK Trade & Investment indicate UK firms have on average sold more arms than their Russian, Chinese or French counterparts between 2006 and 2016, with only the US being a bigger arms exporter.

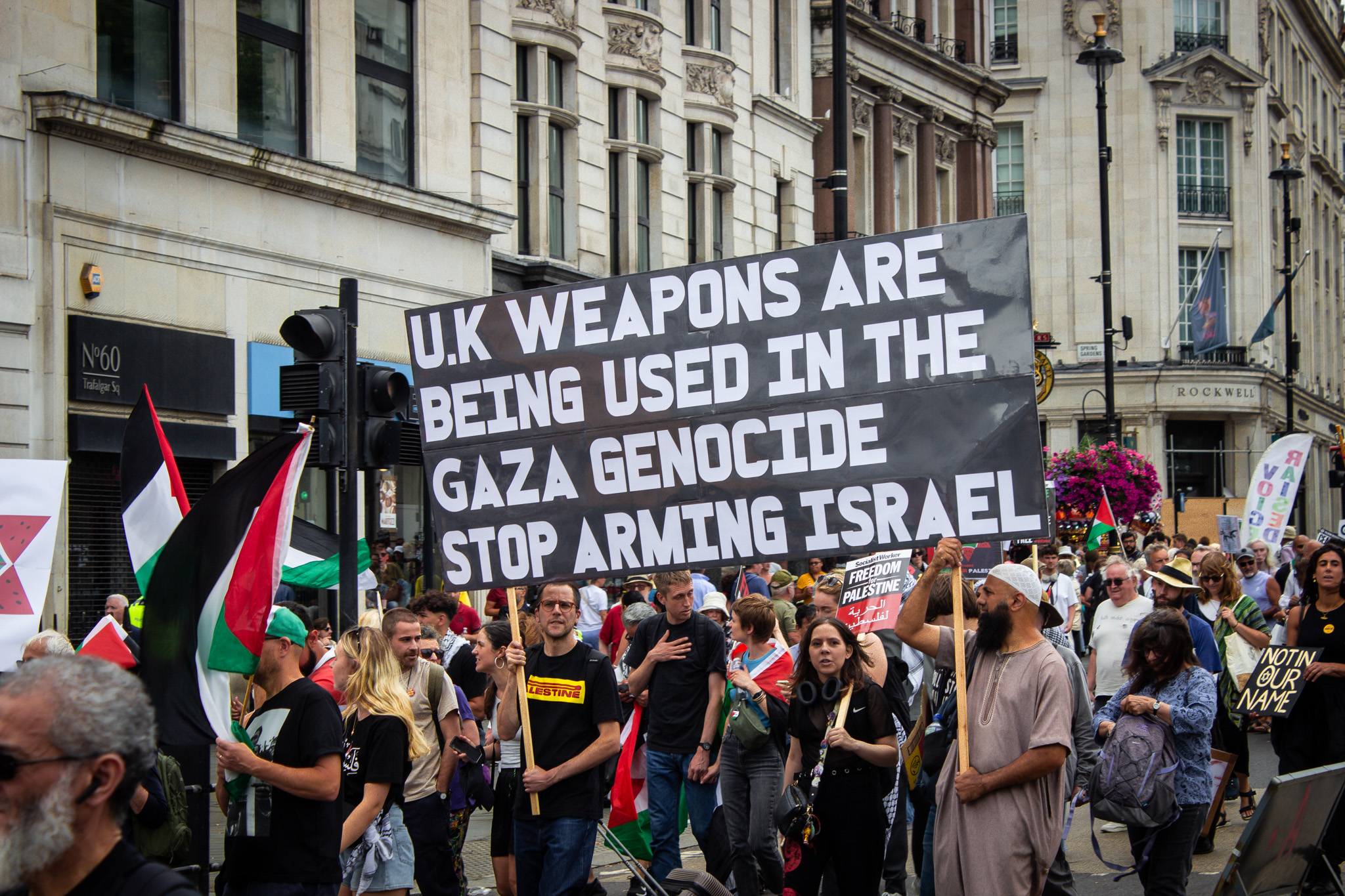
Pro-Palestinian protest at Trafalgar Square, 3 August 2024

In 2016 most of arms exports went to 18 countries including China, Saudi Arabia, Bahrain, Israel, Egypt, and Pakistan. Major deals include the long-running Al Yamamah contract. In 2017, Israel was the second-biggest buyer of UK arms. Bahrain purchased £30.7 million worth of UK arms, Egypt bought £6.5 million, Pakistan purchased £11.2M and £11.8 million worth of arms was sold to China. The Bangladeshi government, which had taken more than 688,000 Rohingya refugees from Myanmar following ethnic cleansing and religious persecution by the government of Myanmar, bought £38.6M of arms. The UK's main arms deals go to the United States, India, France, Germany, Italy, Israel, Oman, South Africa, Turkey, South Korea, the United Arab Emirates and Saudi Arabia, respectively.

Reports indicated that Prince Andrew maintained close ties with the Saudi royal family, which was deemed helpful to British trade interests, particularly in the defense sector.

The arms manufactured in the UK includes bombs, missiles, and fighter jets, machine guns. The shelf-life of weapons is often longer than the governments and organisations they were sold to. A 2021 analysis by the CAAT revealed that the British government financed more than £17 billion worth of weapons to nearly 70% of the world's worst human rights abusers, such as Egypt, Bahrain, Qatar, Saudi Arabia, Thailand and Turkey. In June 2025, Britain's High Court of Justice ruled that the British government's decision to allow the export of F-35 fighter jet parts to Israel was lawful.

In October 2025, British Prime Minister Keir Starmer finalized a landmark defense agreement with Turkey for the sale of 20 Eurofighter Typhoon fighter jets, valued at approximately £8 billion ($10.7 billion).

== Criticism ==
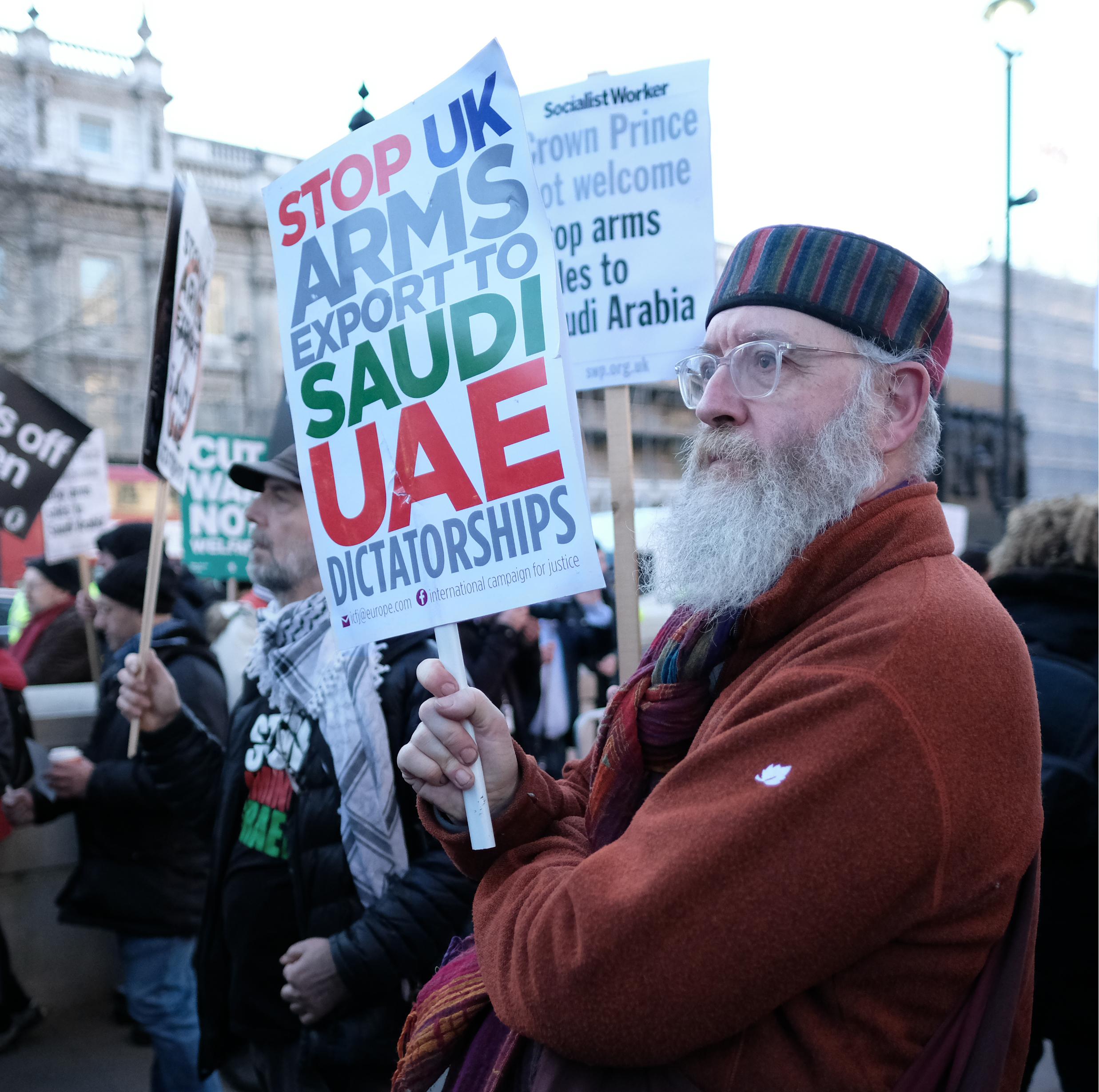
A 2018 protest against arms exports to Saudi Arabia and the United Arab Emirates.

Prince Andrew, during his tenure as the UK's Special Representative for International Trade and Investment, faced significant controversy regarding his role in fostering arms deals with Saudi Arabia, particularly in relation to alleged bribery and corruption involving BAE Systems. In 2010, BAE Systems pleaded guilty in a United States court to charges of false accounting and making misleading statements in connection with the sales. An investigation by the British Serious Fraud Office into the deal was discontinued after political pressure from the Saudi and British governments.

UK arms exports have long been criticised by anti-arms trade organisations, which argue that these exports are primarily going to political repressive regimes. In a 2018 interview with The Independent, Campaign Against Arms Trade (CAAT) spokesperson Andrew Smith claimed that the second May ministry was "actively arming and supporting many of the regimes that even it believes are responsible for terrible human rights abuses" through granting arms export licenses to UK firms which allowed them to export arms to these nations. British campaigners against the UK arms trade have claimed the government system for overseeing arms exports contains little oversight and no controls over how exported arms are used once they are sold. In April 2020, CAAT claimed that their analyses indicated that in 2019 UK firms sold arms worth £1.3bn to 26 out of the 48 nations classified as "not free" by Freedom House. CAAT also stated that the sale of weaponry increased by 300% from 2018.

A major point of criticism regarding UK arms exports have been the sale of UK-made military equipment to the Armed Forces of Saudi Arabia, which have been used in the Saudi-led intervention in the Yemeni civil war. Saudi forces have been accused of committing numerous atrocities during the intervention in the Yemeni civil war. In June 2020, amidst criticism of US police forces' response to the George Floyd protests, the UK government was threatened with an ultimately unrealised lawsuit over the export of riot control equipment to the United States. The UK government has also faced numerous legal challenges over its decisions to grant export licenses for firms selling arms to Saudi Arabia.

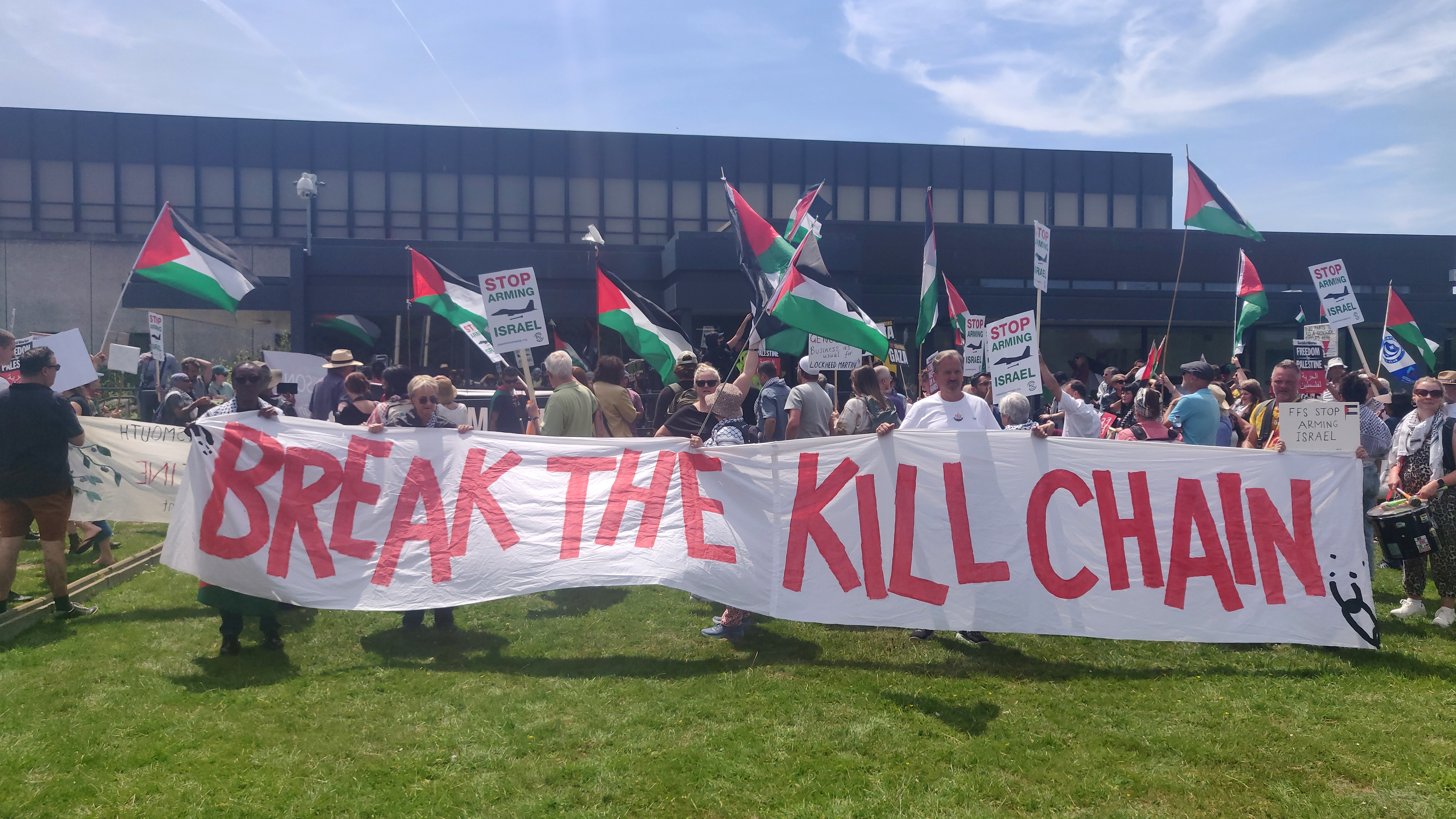
Protest at Lockheed Martin UK in Havant, England, 17 June 2025

Direct action was taken at arms factories in the United Kingdom that supplied arms to Israel. For instance, on 10 November 2023, trade unionists in Rochester, Kent, blocked the entrances to a BAE Systems factory, stating the facility manufactured military aircraft components used to bomb Gaza; and on 16 November, Palestine Action occupied a Leonardo factory in Southampton, stopping production. In August 2025, four protesters (the "Moog 4") scaled the roof of the Moog Inc. factory in Wolverhampton in what they said was an attempt to disrupt the export of parts for F-35 fighter jets and M-346 fighter jet trainers to Israel.

As of late 2025, the UK continued to allow the sale of critical military hardware to Israel, most notably parts for F-35 fighter jets.

In late 2025, Keir Starmer’s government faced intensifying parliamentary and public pressure to suspend arms sales to the United Arab Emirates following reports that British-made military equipment was being diverted to the Rapid Support Forces (RSF) in Sudan. In October 2025, a United Nations Security Council investigation found that British military equipment had been deployed by the RSF during their siege and subsequent capture of El Fasher, North Darfur. The fall of the city followed an 18-month siege and immediately resulted in a large-scale massacre of civilians, characterized by humanitarian experts as one of the worst war crimes of the Sudanese civil war. Foreign Secretary Yvette Cooper has declined to commit to halting British arms exports to the UAE, instead focusing on diplomatic pressure and humanitarian aid.

== See also ==
- Arms industry
- Arms control
