= The Corner House (organisation) =

The Corner House is a not for profit company limited by guarantee founded in 1997 in the United Kingdom. According to its website, it aims "to support democratic & community movements for environmental & social justice".

In 2007, The Corner House and the Campaign Against Arms Trade sought a judicial review of the UK Government's discontinuation of an investigation by the Serious Fraud Office into the Al Yamamah arms deal. The High Court initially declared the Serious Fraud Office's discontinuation unlawful in April 2008, but this decision was unanimously reversed by the House of Lords in July of the same year.

== Legal analysis ==
The principle had already been established in Khalid that where the Crown had no choice, a prosecution could be dropped in the face of an extreme threat. The question was therefore simply whether the Director of the Serious Fraud Office had done 'all that could reasonably be done had been done to resist the threat'. In April 2008 the High Court of Justice ruled that the Serious Fraud Office had acted unlawfully in dropping the investigation for failing to do so.

On 30 July of the same year, this decision was unanimously reversed by the House of Lords. They overruled both the factual and principled basis of the High Court's decision. As a matter of principle, they ruled the courts could only declare the decision unlawful if it was outside of the Director's power, not merely unreasonable. Factually, they held that his decision was in any case reasonable.
