= Ekklesia (think tank) =

Scottish-based think tank

- Founded: 2002; 24 years ago
- Founders: Simon Barrow; Jonathan Bartley
- Headquarters: Edinburgh, Scotland
- Location: United Kingdom
- Director: Simon Barrow
- Website: ekklesia.co.uk

Ekklesia was a not-for-profit British think tank which examines the role of religion on public life and policy in the UK.

== History ==
Ekklesia was founded in 2002 by Jonathan Bartley and Simon Barrow. In September 2002, Ekklesia launched a Sunday programme on BBC Radio Scotland to encourage pacification and minimize violent insurrections in Iraq.

In June 2006, Ekklesia launched a campaign advocating for the separation of the role of the church and state in weddings. The think tank argued that the "one size fits all" attempt to fuse religious and civic marriage was a source of great confusion.

In February 2009, the Bishop of Willesden Pete Broadbent called the directors of Ekklesia "self-appointed self-publicists who speak for nobody ... and pretend that they're speaking for mainstream Christianity". In 2010, when the Christian Concern lobbying group launched the Not Ashamed Day, Ekklesia stated there were no evidence Catholics were being shamed because of their religion. In June 2011, Symon Hill, a bisexual Christian writer and a director of Ekklesia, embarked on a Birmingham-to-London pilgrimage against homophobia.

In October 2012, Ekklesia, in partnership with Edinburgh City Centre Churches Together, the Cornerstone Bookshop, and the Episcopal Diocese of Edinburgh's Adventures in Faith programme, launched the Centre for Living Christianity (CLiC) to explore religious faith in skeptical times.

In March 2016, Ekklesia organized a group letter to ask the new Secretary of State for Work and Pensions, Stephen Crabb, to rethink his ministry's position regarding welfare cuts and benefit sanctions.

Jonathan Bartley left the think tank in 2016 and subsequently became co-leader of the Green Party of England and Wales.

In June 2019, during US President Donald Trump's official visit to the UK, Simon Barrow called Trump "anti-gospel".

The aspects of Ekklesia as a think-tank and broker of news briefings ceased as of September 2024.

== Description ==
The think tank was financed by donations and the online sale of fair-trade goods.

== See also ==
- List of think tanks in the United Kingdom
