= Pablo Dreyfus =

Argentine arms control expert

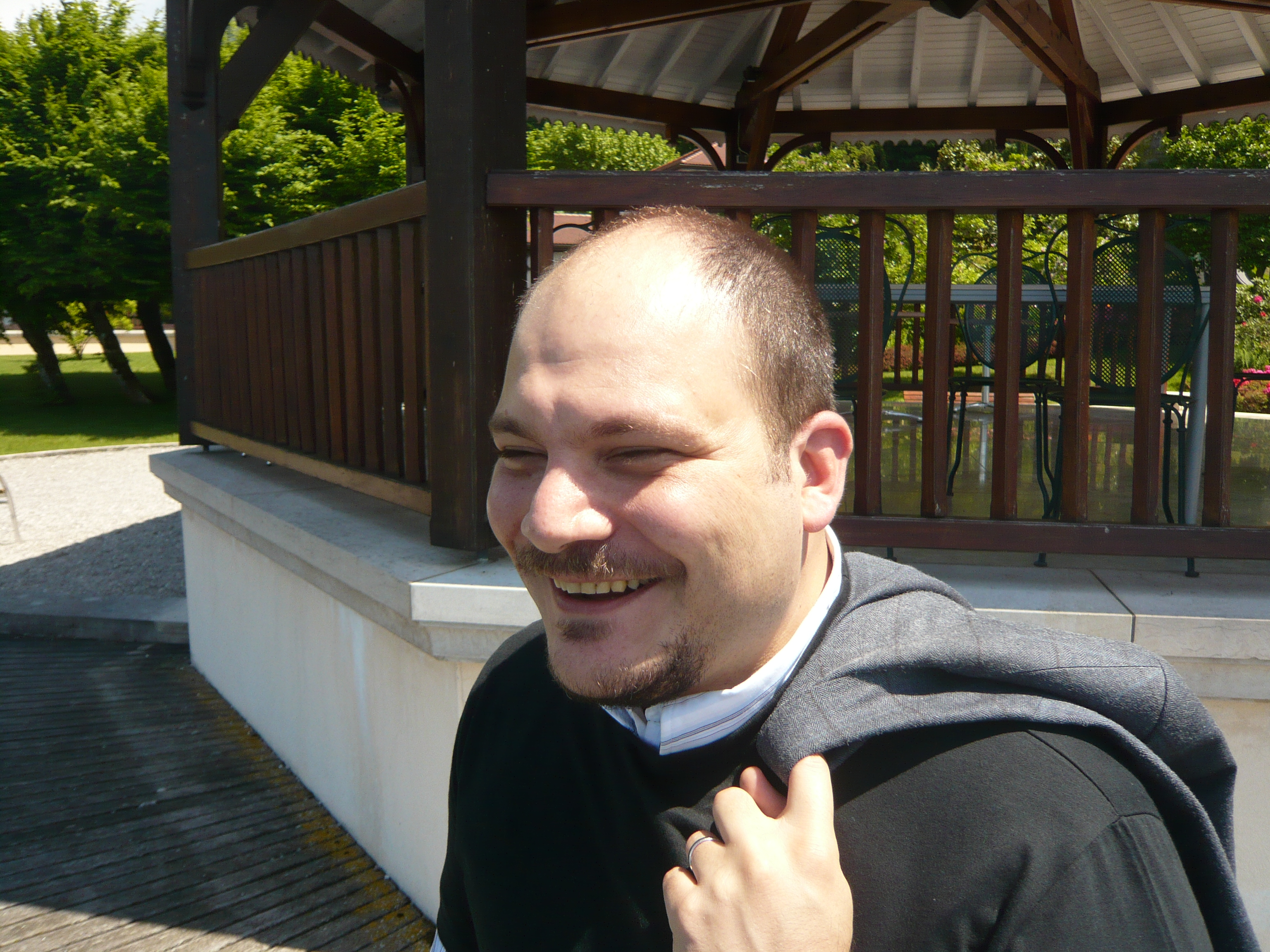
Pablo Dreyfus at the 2008 Small Arms Review Conference

Pablo Dreyfus (born 1969 or 1970; died 1 June 2009) was an Argentine arms control expert who worked in South America, particularly Brazil, to help end the illegal weapons trade prevalent in South America. His work as a consultant and opinion as an expert in his field was in demand worldwide before his death in the crash of Air France Flight 447.

== Early life and education ==
Born in Buenos Aires, he was the son of renowned and award-winning Argentine advertising executive Gabriel Dreyfus, and Ana Piazzetta. He received his PhD in international relations at the Institut Universitaire de Hautes Études Internationales (Graduate Institute of International Studies) where his emphasis was transnational crime patterns.

== Work ==
Dreyfus encouraged better accounting of weapons to prevent them falling into the hands of criminal organizations. He pushed for legislation requiring stricter controls on the labelling of ammunition. He raised the alarm about practices that facilitated arms smuggling in Argentina, Brazil, Paraguay and Venezuela, which led to legislation in Brazil. He supported the development of anti-gunrunning security in Mozambique, Angola, El Salvador and other countries.

Following the theft of grenades from an Argentine military garrison in 2006, Dreyfus remarked "If a supermarket can keep control of the amount of peas it has in stock, surely a military organization could and should be able to do the same with equal if not greater efficiency with its weapons. The key words are logistics, control, security."

In 2009, he was the research coordinator of the small arms and light weapons cluster in a local NGO in Rio, associate professor of the Superior Institute of Religious Studies, consultant of Small Arms Survey, senior researcher and professor of the Latin American Social Sciences Institute (FLACSO) and coordinator of the Friedrich-Ebert-Stiftung (FES) Brazilian think tank of regional security. Dreyfus became better known in the English-speaking world for his work for Viva Rio.

== Personal life and death ==
Dreyfus was onboard the Air France Flight 447 that crashed into the mid-Atlantic Ocean on 1 June 2009, killing all 228 passengers and crew on board. His wife, sociologist and researcher Ana Carolina Rodrigues, died with him on the flight. Rodrigues was finishing her PhD with the Instituto Universitário de Pesquisas do Rio de Janeiro. She was working with children involved in organized armed violence, and had previously worked on social movements and minorities.
