= International Action Network on Small Arms =

Gun control advocacy group

The International Action Network on Small Arms (IANSA) was incorporated on 30 May 2002 under the laws of the United Kingdom of Great Britain and Northern Ireland. The IANSA London office was closed in 2015, but it has an active UN liaison office in New York. IANSA has had registration as an NGO in Ghana since 2014 to reflect the organizations commitments to bringing voices from the global south to the United Nations small arms disarmament process.

IANSA is opposed to the illicit proliferation and misuse of small arms and light weapons. IANSA supports efforts to increase global peace, stability, and sustainability by reducing demand for such weapons, improving firearms regulation, and strengthening controls on arms transfers.

In accordance to IANSA's commitment to the United Nations Sustainable Development Goal 5, IANSA has sought to significantly increase the role of women in the global conversation on small arms and light weapons (SALW) related violence. Through initiatives such as the "16 Days of Activism Against Gender Violence," IANSA has worked to encourage meaningful participation of women as stakeholders in the fight against gun violence, as opposed to passive victims.

IANSA's Women's Network is the only international network focused on the connections between gender, women's rights, small arms and armed violence.

== United Nations activities ==
IANSA was involved in lobbying the 2001 United Nations Conference on the Illicit Trade in Small Arms which produced an agreed Programme of Action. A UN Review Conference ended in July 2006 United Nations Small Arms Review Conference 2006 without further agreement. A subsequent meeting (The Biennial Meeting of States 3 "BMS3") in 2008 agreed a substantive outcome document by a majority vote.

IANSA, part of the Control Arms Campaign, promotes an international treaty regulating the conventional arms trade called the Arms Trade Treaty. A resolution to begin work on this Arms Trade Treaty was approved by the UN General Assembly in 2006 and the completed treaty was put into force on 24 December 2014.

Since IANSA's founding, there have been three Review Conferences and six Biennial Meetings of States to review the Programme of Action, present the advancements that states have made in the field of SALW, and facilitate debate around different regulatory commitments.

== Gun control activities ==
IANSA is described as an umbrella network that represent over 800 civil society organizations in 120 countries concerned about gun violence. IANSA advocates that private citizens undergo a licensing process before they possess firearms, and that legally possessed firearms be stored unloaded and away from ammunition.

== Funding ==
IANSA is currently funded through a UN Trust Facility Supporting Cooperation on Arms Regulation (UNSCAR) grant.

== See also ==
- Small arms proliferation
