= Richard Paniguian =

British oil industry executive

Sir Richard Paniguian CBE
- Paniguian in 2011
- Born: Richard Leon Paniguian; 26 July 1949
- Died: 25 June 2017 (aged 67)
- Citizenship: United Kingdom
- Education: Westminster School; Durham University; INSEAD
- Occupation: Business executive
- Employer(s): BP (1971–2008); UK Trade & Investment (2008–2015)
- Spouse: Nil Okan

Sir Richard Leon Paniguian (26 July 1949 – 25 June 2017) was a British oil industry executive with close ties to British intelligence.

Paniguian held multiple senior roles with BP and was a project manager in some of its most challenging territories.

== Early life and education ==
Paniguian was born on 28 July 1949 and grew up with his sister Helen in South Kensington, London. His father, Hracia, known to friends as 'Pan', came from a Constantinople family of Armenian origin. Hracia served with the Special Operations Executive during the Second World War before pursuing a career in advertising.

He was educated at The Hampshire School, Chelsea followed by Westminster School, then read for a degree in Arabic at Durham University. At Durham he was treasurer of Hatfield College JCR and was an active rugby player. He graduated with a 2:1 degree in 1971.

== Career ==
=== 1971–1980 ===
After university he joined BP in 1971 as a graduate trainee in the oil trading division, and spent the first years of his career in Oman and then Dubai.

He relocated to Iran in 1978, where his position as commercial representative in Tehran was complicated by the outbreak of the Iranian Revolution. In response, he added a moustache to his "swarthy complexion" so he could walk the streets inconspicuously. However, this did not save him from being briefly arrested after he was found in possession of a transistor radio.

=== 1980–2008 ===
Paniguian moved to the United States, where he became vice-president of international oil trading at the New York office. He served as president of BP Turkey from 1989 to 1992, before becoming director of BP Europe until 1995 and chief executive of BP Shipping until 1999. He was then appointed vice-president for the Middle East region. In this role he was heavily occupied with the construction of the Baku–Tbilisi–Ceyhan pipeline across Azerbaijan, Georgia and Turkey.

In 2001 he became group vice-president for Russia, the Caspian, Middle East and Africa, where he was responsible for developing and delivering BP’s growth strategy in these regions. He played a leading role in the completion of BP's first oil project in Angola. He was promoted to group vice-president for BP as a whole in 2002. On the eve of the Iraq War, he was busy in Whitehall lobbying the British government on behalf of BP and other UK oil companies seeking commercial access in post-conflict Iraq.

=== 2008–2017 ===
On his retirement from BP in 2008, Paniguian became head of the Defence and Security Organisation (DSO) within UK Trade and Investment, working alongside defence manufacturers in their export sales efforts. While nominally part of UKTI (now the Department for International Trade) he actually reported to the Ministry of Defence. His new role made him one of the highest paid civil servants in the United Kingdom, earning a salary between £195,000-£199,000.

Paniguian's tenure at UKTI DSO coincided with efforts by the British government to expand defence exports to Libya following the lifting of international sanctions. In a May 2009 speech, he cited Libya among countries where "high-level political interventions" had supported British arms sales. The government's commercial relationship with Libya attracted controversy following the August 2009 release of Abdelbaset al-Megrahi, who had been convicted of the Lockerbie bombing, amid allegations that British commercial interests had influenced efforts to secure his release.

Under his leadership DSO achieved a record of £13 billion in sales in 2013. He retired from the DSO in February 2015 and became chairman of C5 Holdings, a European based private equity fund specializing in cyber and big data technologies. He joined the board of Raytheon the following year.

== Personal ==
Paniguian was married to Nil Okan, a language trainer at the Foreign and Commonwealth Office, and had two stepsons. He had no children of his own. He was a longstanding member of the Marylebone Cricket Club and regularly entertained friends at Brooks's.

Paniguian was appointed Commander of the Order of the British Empire (CBE) in the 2007 New Year Honours and was knighted in the 2015 New Year Honours.

He died suddenly on 25 June 2017 of a heart attack.
