= Arms Reduction Coalition =

The Arms Reduction Coalition (ARC) is a United Kingdom-based non-profit non-governmental organisation which campaigns for a reduction in the resources spent on arms and the military and for those resources to be diverted to programmes that benefit humanity and the earth; such as poverty reduction, sustainable development, protecting the vulnerable, systems for peaceful Conflict resolution and maintaining the environment.

The Arms Reduction Coalition (ARC) is a calling for the United Nations (UN) to agree a legally binding instrument requiring United Nations member states to reduce the amount of resources spent on arms by 1% - 5% per year for a period of 10 to 25 years. This is based on Article 26 of the United Nations Charter which states "In order to promote the establishment and maintenance of international peace and security with the least diversion for armaments of the world’s human and economic resources, the UN Security Council shall be responsible for formulating…, plans to be submitted to the Members of the United Nations for the establishment of a system for the regulation of Armaments".

Arms Reduction Coalition

== History ==
ARC was officially launched at a meeting organised by Action for UN Renewal on 7 May 2002 at the House of Commons in London.

ARC campaigns to encourage the United Nations member states to 'Implement Article 26 of the UN Charter' by reducing the diversion for armaments of the world's human and economic resources by a set percentage each year. This policy is or has been advocated by other organisations such as the International Peace Bureau, World Bank, some members of the United Nations (such as France in 1955, The Soviet Union in 1956, Brazil in 1964, by Romania in 1975 and 1977 and Senegal in 1978) and The General Assembly (in 1973 as Resolution 3093); usually under the principle of Disarmament for Development. The idea can be traced back ^{[4]} to 1955 when the French Prime Minister Edgar Faure tabled a plan at a meeting of the UN Disarmament Commission^{[5]}; proposing the "progressive reduction of military expenditures and the potential reallocation of the resources thus released to tasks of 'development' and 'mutual assistance' in order to improve the standard of living of the developing countries".

According to its official website, the goals of the ARCUK were indirectly accomplished through the creation of the Arms Trade Treaty.

== Membership ==
ARC's Patrons include Dennis Haliday, Bruce Kent, Peter Archer, Baron Archer of Sandwell, Alice Mahon, Federico Mayor Zaragoza, Linda Melvern.

Individuals and organisations from around the world are encouraged to join ARC by endorsing the ARC Resolution or becoming a member. Organisations from all continents have endorsed the ARC resolution. Similar resolutions have been adopted by other groups such as United Nations Association UK, The Hague Agenda for Peace and Justice for the 21st Century, German Party of Democratic Socialism and Greenpeace.

== ARC resolution ==
ARC's campaign is driven by this United Nations style resolution. Supporters and members are requested endorse this resolution.

The Arms Reduction Coalition (ARC):

"Concerned by the obstacles, threats and difficulties that the large amounts of arms in circulation pose to the maintenance of peace and security and to Non-Governmental Organisations and UN departments in carrying out their work;

Concerned by the disproportionately large amount of the world’s human and economic resources being expended on arms;

Recalling that Article 26 of the United Nations (UN) Charter calls for "the least diversion for Armaments of the world’s human and economic resources";

Calls upon the United Nations General assembly, to agree, and for all signatory States of The United Nations to ratify, a legally binding instrument:

a) to reduce the diversion for Armaments of their State's human and economic resources by between one and five percent per year;

b) to establish and maintain systems that enable annual independent verification and auditing of their States compliance;

c) to establish a United Nations mechanism to facilitate implementation; dealing with such matters as non-compliance, concessions, reporting and auditing standards, and the publication of targets and achievements annually;

d) that specifies how amounts diverted from Armaments are to be used on State and UN programmes such as poverty reduction, sustainable development, conflict prevention, peaceful resolution of conflict, protecting the vulnerable, maintaining the environment; and effective and efficient implementation of the legally binding Instrument;

e) that gives full opportunities to non-governmental organisations and other non state actors to make their contributions in implementation, compliance and allocation of resources;

f) that requires review and re-commitment by the States to the legally binding Instrument after a period of between 10 and 25 years."

- The ARC Resolution has been translated into several languages.

== ARC publications ==
Some publications distributed by ARC (under the Creative Commons Attribution ShareAlike licence) include:

- ARC Petition
- Arms No More by Vijay Mehta, is a comprehensive study of small arms, light weapons and weapons of mass destruction – nuclear, biological and chemical. It outlines global efforts to develop and implement effective projects to limit the use and spread of small arms, which stands as a critical challenge to human security.
- ARC Music.

== Sources ==
Doc: DC/71, annex 16. France: draft agreement on the financial supervision of disarmament and the allocation for peaceful purposes on the funds made available
