= DSEI =

Biennial Defence Exhibition in London

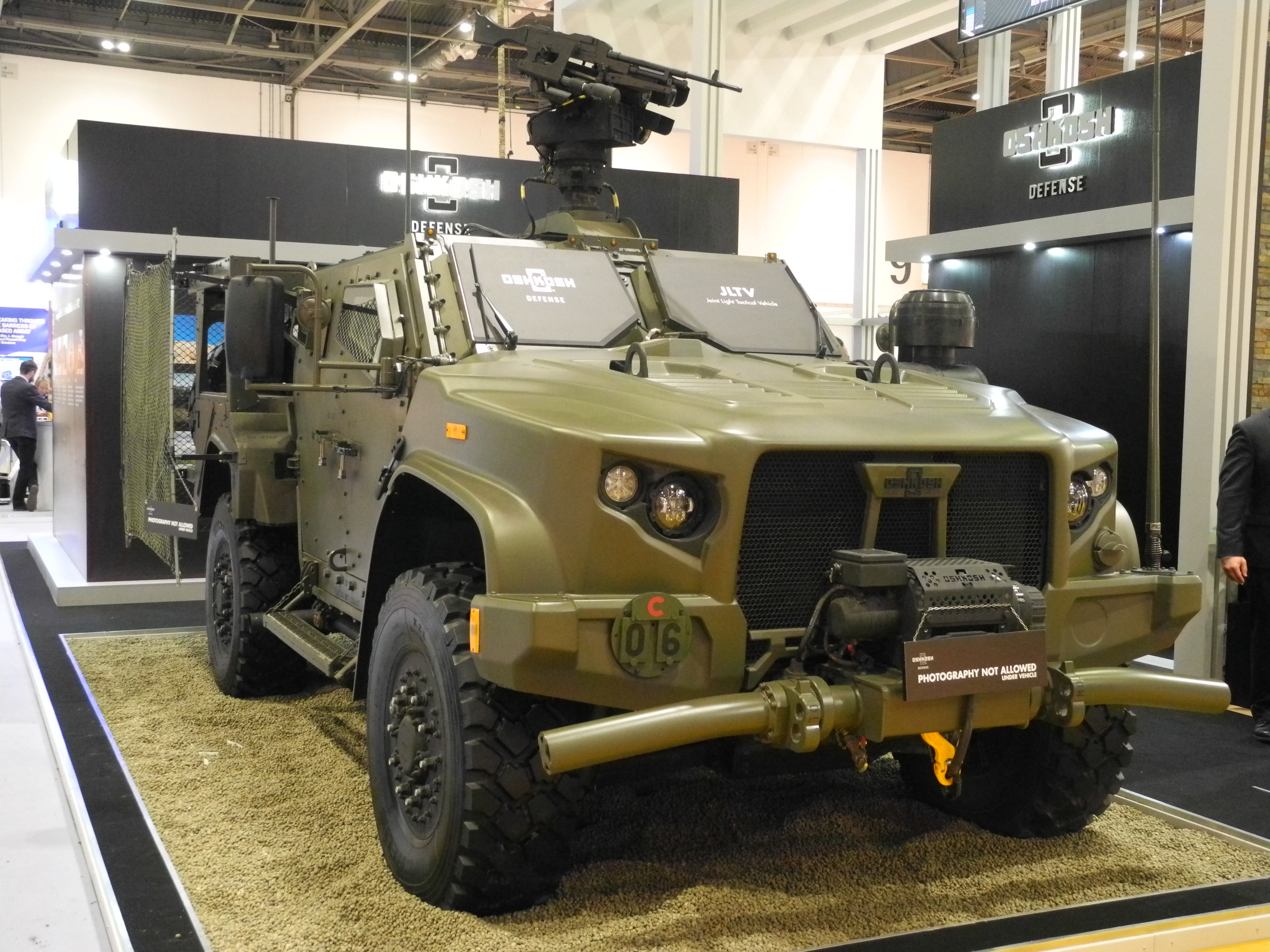
An Oshkosh Joint Light Tactical Vehicle painted in Olive green.

Defence and Security Equipment International (DSEI, formerly stylized DSEi) is a biennial defence and security trade exhibition which serves as a forum between governments, national armed forces, industry, and academics, held at ExCeL London.

DSEI 2025 was the largest to date, comprising approximately 1700 exhibitors from 62 countries. The next DSEI will be held in 2027.

== History ==
In 1999, the UK's Labour Government (First Blair ministry) privatised the joint British Army and Royal Navy Exhibitions which had taken place since 1976. Exhibition company, Spearhead Exhibitions Inc., launched DSEI (then known as Defence and Systems Equipment International) and the first event took place at Chertsey, Surrey in September 1999.

=== 2000s ===
In 2001, the exhibition moved to its current location at the ExCeL exhibition centre in London Docklands.

According to The Times, DSEI 2005 reportedly took place at a cost to the taxpayer of £3,760,250. Weapons banned for export from the UK, including leg irons, stun guns and stun batons, were advertised at that exhibition. Organisers of the arms show were said to be "increasingly sensitive about the sale or promotion of controversial weapons systems by exhibitors."

In 2007, two exhibitors were expelled by the organisers, Reed Exhibitions, after distributing brochures advertising leg irons.

=== 2010s ===
DSEI rebranded in 2009 to Defence and Security Equipment International.

In 2011, DSEI ejected two exhibitors promoting cluster munitions which are banned by the UK. In the same year, campaign network Stop The Arms Fair (STAF) was set up to protest UK arms fairs, particularly DSEI. STAF's tactics include disruption during the event set-up and protests during the week of exhibition.

In 2013, DSEI ejected French firm Magforce International and Chinese company Tianjin Myway for promoting illegal weapons. The Green Party MP Caroline Lucas said the companies were promoting stun batons, weighted leg cuffs and handheld projectile electric shock weapons.

Private Eye investigative reporter Ian Cobain had his press pass application to DSEI 2019 rejected. While DSEI stated that this was due to application volumes, internal emails were uncovered by Middle East Eye where a CMS Strategic consultant wrote “He didn’t attend DSEI in 2017 and his works looks somewhat contentious, with lots about Yemen, torture, “arms sales” references etc.”

=== 2020s ===
DSEI 2021 took place between 14–17 September 2021, despite protestations from Sadiq Khan. It gave an exhibition of land, aerospace, naval, joint and security capabilities, with an extensive keynote and seminar programme as well as the debut of DSEI Connect, a virtual platform created to give access to DSEI content and business development opportunities for those unable to attend in person. In the same year, Amnesty International reported a brochure listing "waist chains and cuffs with leg cuffs" by a company at the event.

DSEI 2023 was the largest in its 24-year history, breaking records in overall attendance, number of visitors, and international delegations. There were 23% more attendees than 2019. DSEI hosted more than 1,500 exhibitors (over 250 of those exhibiting for the first time). DSEI offered an online industry buyer and supplier networking tool (MeetMe) to facilitate meetings and connections. The policing of DSEI in 2023 was estimated to cost over £3 million.

In 2025 the UK government made the decision not to invite an Israeli delegation due to Israel's escalation in Gaza. However, Israeli defence companies were allowed to attend. Representatives of Declassified UK and Private Eye were not given press access to the 2025 event. Previously, in 2021, Declassified was given a press pass, with event spokesman General Roddy Porter then quoted as saying “We’ve got nothing to hide here. This is a legitimate government transactional business”.

== Ownership ==
In April 2008, Clarion Events acquired DSEI, after it was sold by its previous owners, the publishing company Reed Elsevier. The sale after an extensive public campaign in the UK encouraged the company to divest from the arms trade. This campaign included letters published by doctors in The Lancet (which is owned by Elsevier), an editorial in The BMJ, and letters from writers and academics published in The Times Literary Supplement and Times Higher Education respectively. In addition to the sale of DSEI, Reed Elsevier announced in their 2008 AGM that they had not renewed their contract to organise the Taipei Aerospace & Defense Technology Exhibition, and had also sold the International Defence Exhibition (IDEX).

In 2024, it was reported that Clarion Events would be purchased by American private equity firm Blackstone Inc.

In October 2026, Informa, a British publishing, business intelligence and events group, agreed to purchase Clarion Events from Blackstone for £2.24bn.

== Stakeholders ==
Fully endorsed by the UK Ministry of Defence and the Department for International Trade, DSEI maintains a strong standing with the Royal Navy, the British Army and the Royal Air Force. The theme for each DSEI is determined in partnership with the Ministry of Defence. The theme for the 2027 fair is "Delivering the Integrated Force", and was announced by Air Chief Marshal Rich Knighton.

== Criticism ==
More than 100 protestors were arrested for blockading the event in 2017, with the Supreme Court subsequently ruling on proportionality.

In 2019, London mayor Sadiq Khan criticised the event, stating "London is a global city, which is home to individuals who have fled conflict and suffered as a consequence of arms and weapons like those exhibited at DSEI. In order to represent Londoners’ interests, I will take any opportunity available to prevent this event from taking place at the Royal Docks in future years."

Amnesty International has criticised the event for selling weapons of torture and for providing weapons that have been traced to attacks on civilians. In 2019, Amnesty International made a spoof video highlighting the event and criticising its activities.

In 2021, a motion was put forward by members of the UK parliament for the Government to withdraw its support for DSEI, which received 13 signatories.

Campaign Against Arms Trade (CAAT) regularly campaigns against DSEI citing that many of the official military and security delegations that attend the exhibition represent human rights abusing regimes such as Egypt, the UAE, Bahrain and all countries on the UK Government's own list of "countries of concern". One regime that CAAT highlights is Saudi Arabia which has been one of the leading countries involved in the war in Yemen which CAAT states "has seen the deaths of thousands of civilians, and estimated arms sales to the coalition around £18 billion since the conflict began in 2015".
