= Arms Trade Treaty =

International treaty regulating arms trade (2014 - onwards)

- Map showing which states have signed or ratified the Treaty. Signatories Parties
- Signed: Open for signature from 3 June 2013
- Location: New York City, USA
- Sealed: 2 April 2013
- Effective: 24 December 2014
- Condition: 90 days after ratification by 50 states (Article 22)
- Signatories: 130
- Parties: 116
- Depositary: UN Secretary-General
- Languages: Arabic, Chinese, English, French, Russian, Spanish

Full text
- Arms Trade Treaty at Wikisource

The Arms Trade Treaty (ATT) is a multilateral treaty, the first legally binding United Nations treaty to establish international standards regulating the international trade of conventional weapons for the purpose of contributing to international and regional peace; reducing human suffering; and promoting co-operation, transparency, and responsible action by and among states.

The treaty was negotiated in New York City at a global conference under the auspices of the United Nations (UN) from 2–27 July 2012. As it was not possible to reach an agreement on a final text at that time, a new meeting for the conference was scheduled for 18–28 March 2013. On 2 April 2013, the UN General Assembly adopted the ATT, which entered into force on 24 December 2014. As at late 2026, 118 states had ratified the treaty, the last being Ecuador, and a further 25 states have signed but not ratified it.

International weapons commerce has been estimated to reach US$70 billion a year.

== Origins ==
The roots of what is known today as the Arms Trade Treaty (ATT) can be traced back to the late 1980s, when civil society actors and Nobel Peace Prize Laureates voiced their concerns about the unregulated nature of the global arms trade and its impact on human security.

The ATT is part of a larger global effort begun in 1997 by Costa Rican President and 1987 Nobel Peace Prize laureate Óscar Arias. In that year, Arias led a group of Nobel Peace Prize laureates in a meeting in New York to offer the world a code of conduct for the trade in arms. This group included Elie Wiesel, Betty Williams, the Dalai Lama, José Ramos-Horta, representatives of International Physicians for the Prevention of Nuclear War, Amnesty International, and the American Friends Service Committee. The original idea was to establish ethical standards for the arms trade that would eventually be adopted by the international community. Over the following 16 years, the Arias Foundation for Peace & Human Progress has played an instrumental role in achieving approval of the treaty.

In 2001, the process continued with the adoption of a non-legally binding program of action at the United Nations Conference on the Illicit Trade in Small Arms. This program was formally called the "Programme of Action to Prevent, Combat and Eradicate the Illicit Trade in Small Arms and Light Weapons in All Its Aspects" (PoA).

Later put forward in 2003 by a group of Nobel Peace Laureates, the ATT was first addressed in the UN in December 2006 when the General Assembly adopted resolution 61/89 "Towards an Arms Trade Treaty: establishing common international standards for the import, export and transfer of conventional arms".

The ATT, like the PoA, is predicated upon a hypothesis that the illicit trade in small arms is a large and serious problem requiring global action through the UN. According to a well regarded 2012 Routledge Studies in Peace and Conflict Resolution publication, "the relative importance of diversion or misuse of officially authorised transfers, compared to international entirely illegal black market trafficking has been thoroughly confirmed." The authors go on to elaborate that, "For most developing or fragile states, a combination of weak domestic regulation of authorised firearms possession with theft, loss or corrupt sale from official holdings tends to be a bigger source of weapons concern than illicit trafficking across borders."

== Development ==
=== UN resolution 61/89 ===
On 18 December 2006, UK Ambassador for Multilateral Arms Control and Disarmament John Duncan formally introduced resolution 61/89, which requested that the UN Secretary-General seek the views of UN member states on the feasibility, scope, and draft parameters for a "comprehensive, legally binding instrument establishing common international standards for the import, export and transfer of conventional arms", and submit a report on the subject to the General Assembly. 94 states submitted their views, which are contained in the 2007 report A/62/278. Duncan was speaking on behalf of the co-authors (Argentina, Australia, Costa Rica, Finland, France, Japan, and Kenya). On behalf of the European Union, Finland highlighted the support for the effort, saying: "everyday, everywhere, people are affected by the side effects of irresponsible arms transfers ... As there is currently no comprehensive internationally binding instrument available to provide an agreed regulatory framework for this activity, the EU welcomes the growing support, in all parts of the world, for an ATT." 94 States submitted their views, which are contained in the 2007 report A/62/278.

In December 2006, 153 member states voted in favor of the resolution. 24 countries abstained: Bahrain, Belarus, China, Egypt, India, Iran, Iraq, Israel, Kuwait, Laos, Libya, Marshall Islands, Nepal, Oman, Pakistan, Qatar, Russia, Saudi Arabia, Sudan, Syria, UAE, Venezuela, Yemen, and Zimbabwe.

Responding to procedural concerns that were not resolved before the final draft of the resolution, the UK said the aim of the initiative was to start a discussion on the feasibility and draft parameters of an Arms Trade Treaty, and that "agnostic" states would have a clear opportunity to engage in the process. After the vote, Algeria indicated that the effort must receive broad-based support from states and be based on the principles of the UN Charter.

==== Group of Governmental Experts ====
Resolution 61/89 also requested the Secretary-General establish a group of governmental experts, on the basis of equitable geographical distribution, to examine the feasibility, scope, and draft parameters for such a legal instrument, and to transmit the report of the group of experts to the General Assembly for consideration at its sixty-third session. On 28 September 2007, the Secretary-General appointed a Group of Governmental Experts from the following 28 countries: Algeria, Argentina, Australia, Brazil, China, Colombia, Costa Rica, Cuba, Egypt, Finland, France, Germany, India, Indonesia, Italy, Japan, Kenya, Mexico, Nigeria, Pakistan, Romania, Russia, South Africa, Spain, Switzerland, Ukraine, the United Kingdom, and United States. The group met three times in 2008, and published a final report on the issue.

=== Preparatory Committee and Conference ===
In 2009, Óscar Arias, then in his second term as President of Costa Rica, introduced the Treaty at the United Nations, saying:

I return today, as a Rip Van Winkle of the modern era, to see that everything has changed except this. Peace continues to be a step further away. Nuclear and conventional weapons still exist despite the promises. It is up to us to ensure that in twenty years we do not awaken to the same terrors we suffer today. I am not ignorant of the fact that the biggest arms dealers in the world are represented here. But today I do not speak to the arms manufacturers, but rather to the leaders of humanity, who have the responsibility to put principles before profits, and enable the promise of a future in which, finally, we can sleep peacefully.

In that same year, an Open-ended Working Group—open to all States—held two meetings on an arms trade treaty. A total of six sessions of this Group were planned. However, at the end of 2009, the General Assembly of the UN decided by resolution A/RES/64/48 to convene a Conference on the Arms Trade Treaty in 2012 "to elaborate a legally binding instrument on the highest possible common international standards for the transfer of conventional arms". The decision was influenced by the change in position of the United States (the largest arms producer and only country voting against resolution 61/89), which took place upon a change in leadership from George W. Bush to Barack Obama, on the condition they were "under the rule of consensus decision-making needed to ensure that all countries can be held to standards that will actually improve the global situation."

=== Adoption of the Treaty ===
United Nations General Assembly vote on the Arms Trade Treaty in 2013. In favour Against Abstentions Absent Non-member

The UN General Assembly of 2 April 2013 (71st Plenary Meeting) adopted the ATT as a resolution by a 154-to-3 vote with 23 abstentions. North Korea, Iran, and Syria voted in opposition. China and Russia, among the world's leaders in weapon exports, were among the 23 nations that abstained. Cuba, India, Indonesia, Myanmar, Nicaragua, Saudi Arabia, and Sudan also abstained. Armenia, Dominican Republic, Venezuela, and Vietnam did not vote.

The treaty was opened for formal signature by all states in New York on 3 June 2013. It entered into force on 24 December 2014, 90 days after the date of the 50th ratification.

== Content ==
The UN Office for Disarmament Affairs claimed the treaty would not interfere with domestic arms commerce or the right to bear arms in its member states; ban the export of any type of weapon; harm the legitimate right to self-defence; or undermine national arms regulation standards already in place.

The Arms Trade Treaty obligates member states to monitor arms exports and ensure that weapons don't cross existing arms embargoes or end up being used for human-rights abuses, including terrorism. Member states, with the assistance of the U.N., will put into place enforceable, standardized arms import and export regulations (much like those that already exist in the U.S.) and be expected to track the destination of exports to ensure they do not end up in the wrong hands. Ideally, that means limiting the inflow of deadly weapons into places like Syria.

Advocates of the treaty say that it only pertains to international arms trade, and would have no effect on current domestic laws. These advocates point to the UN General Assembly resolution starting the process on the ATT. The resolution explicitly states that it is "the exclusive right of States to regulate internal transfers of arms and national ownership, including through constitutional protections on private ownership."

=== Advocated contents ===
International non-government and human rights organizations including Amnesty International, Oxfam, the Arias Foundation for Peace and Human Progress, Saferworld, and the International Action Network on Small Arms (who lead the Control Arms Campaign) have developed analysis on what an effective ATT would look like.

It would ensure that no transfer is permitted if there is substantial risk that it is likely to:

- be used in serious violations of international human rights or humanitarian law, or acts of genocide or crimes against humanity;
- facilitate terrorist attacks, a pattern of gender-based violence, violent crime, or organized crime;
- violate UN Charter obligations, including UN arms embargoes;
- be diverted from its stated recipient;
- adversely affect regional security; or
- seriously impair poverty reduction or socioeconomic development.

Loopholes would be minimized. It would include:

- all weapons—including all military, security, and police arms, related equipment and ammunition, components, expertise, and production equipment;
- all types of transfer—including import, export, re-export, temporary transfer, and transshipment, in the state sanctioned and commercial trade, plus transfers of technology, loans, gifts, and aid; and
- all transactions—including those by dealers and brokers, and those providing technical assistance, training, transport, storage, finance, and security.

The Amnesty International website "loopholes" include shotguns marketed for deer hunting that are virtually the same as military/police shotguns and rifles marketed for long range target shooting that are virtually the same as military/police sniper rifles. Amnesty International advocates that the civilian guns must be included in any workable arms trade controls; otherwise, governments could authorize export/import of sporting guns virtually the same as military/police weapons in function.

It must be workable and enforceable. It must:

- provide guidelines for the treaty's full, clear implementation;
- ensure transparency—including full annual reports of national arms transfers;
- have an effective mechanism to monitor compliance;
- ensure accountability—with provisions for adjudication, dispute settlement, and sanctions;
- include a comprehensive framework for international cooperation and assistance.

NGOs are also advocating that the ATT must reinforce existing responsibilities to assist survivors of armed violence, as well as identify new avenues to address suffering and trauma.

== Criticism ==
Opposition to the ATT can be broken down into state opposition and civil society opposition. Over thirty states have objected to various parts of the ATT during negotiations, the majority of which held strong concerns about the implications for national sovereignty. From a civil society point of view, groups concerned about national sovereignty or individual rights to armed defense have been negative of the ATT. While not fundamentally opposed to an ATT, these groups are keenly sensitive to ensuring an ATT does not undermine national constitutional protections and individual rights. The most vocal and organized civil society groups opposing aspects of the ATT originated from the United States. These groups include the National Rifle Association of America (NRA), the National Shooting Sports Foundation, the Second Amendment Foundation, and The Heritage Foundation. The NRA and the Gun Owners of America say that the treaty is an attempt to circumvent the Second Amendment and similar guarantees in state constitutions in order to impose domestic gun regulations.

One of the largest sources of civil opposition to the ATT has come from the Institute for Legislative Action (ILA), which is the lobbying arm of the NRA. In July 2012, ILA stated that:

Anti-gun treaty proponents continue to mislead the public, claiming the treaty would have no impact on American gun owners. This is a bald-faced lie. For example, the most recent draft treaty includes export/import controls that would require officials in an importing country to collect information on the "end user" of a firearm, keep the information for 20 years, and provide the information to the country from which the gun was exported. In other words, if you bought a Beretta Shotgun, you would be an "end user" and the U.S. government would have to keep a record of you and notify the Italian government about your purchase. That is gun registration. If the U.S. refuses to implement this data collection on law-abiding American gun owners, other nations might be required to ban the export of firearms to the U.S.

On 12 July 2012, the United States issued a statement condemning the selection of Iran to serve as vice president of the conference. The statement called the move "outrageous" and noted that Iran is under UN Security Council sanctions for weapons proliferation.

Canada was accused by Project Ploughshares, a Canadian human rights group, of violating the treaty, as well as its own laws, by selling "Group 2" types of high-tech imaging and targeting systems to Turkey to conduct its air campaigns in the Syrian civil war.

In August 2024, Amnesty International cited continued weapons transfers to Israel during the Gaza war as a "stark example" of the failure of states to comply with the ATT.

== Signatories and parties ==
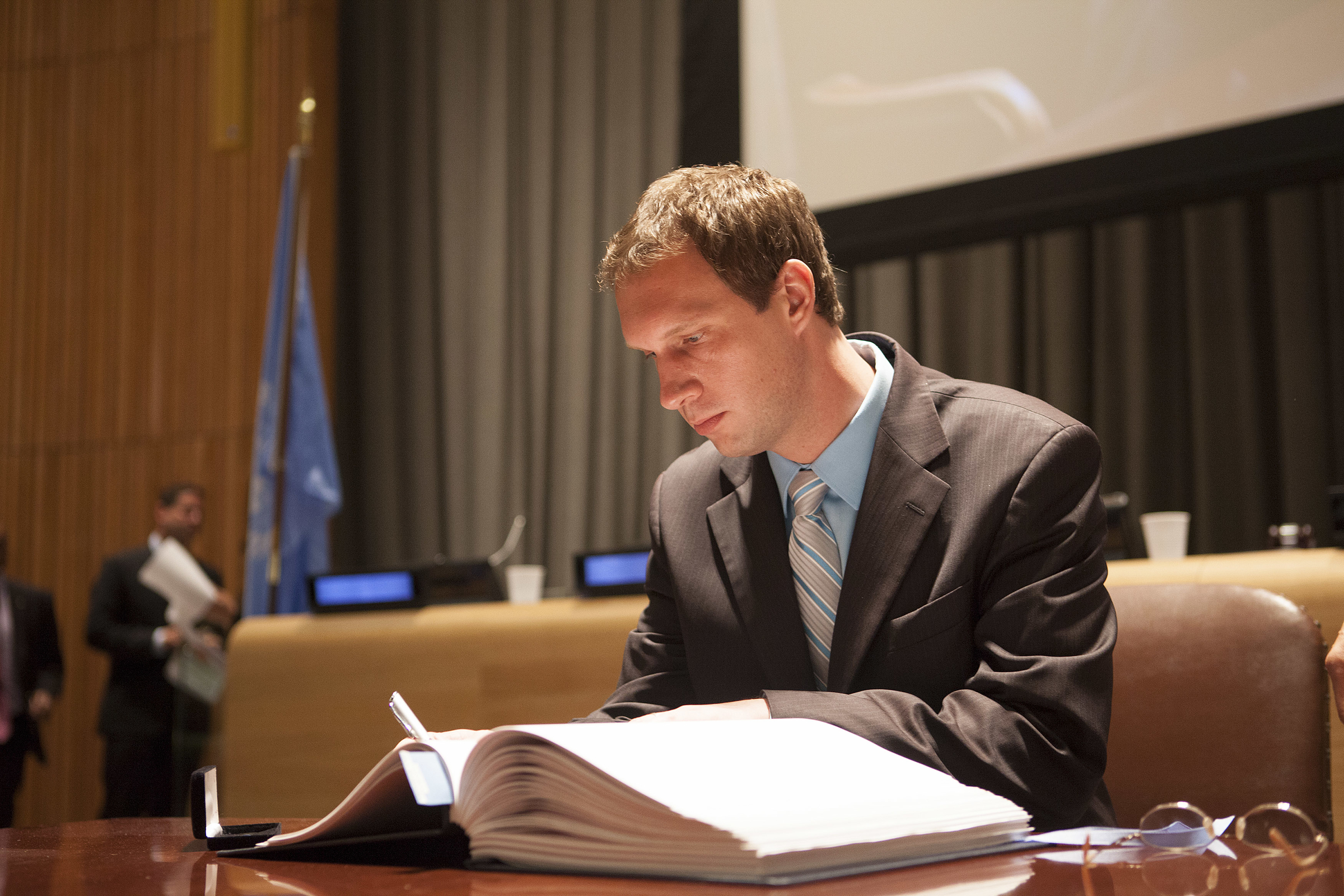
Signature of Slovenia

As of November 2026, the ATT has been ratified or acceded to by 118 states, including six of the world's top 10 arms producers (France, Germany, Spain, China, the United Kingdom and Italy). The other top arms producers that have not ratified ATT are the United States, Russia, South Korea and Israel. Twenty-one ratifying states provisionally applied articles 6 and 7 of the treaty, pending its entry into force. The strong support of the European Union for the treaty is seen in its ATT Outreach Project (ATT-OP) established by EU Council Decision 2013/768/CFSP.

States that have joined the Arms Trade Treaty
State	Signed	Ratified or acceded	Entry into force
Afghanistan		29 July 2020	29 July 2020
Albania	3 June 2013	19 March 2014	24 December 2014
Andorra	18 December 2014	2 December 2022	2 March 2023
Antigua and Barbuda	3 June 2013	12 August 2013	12 August 2013 (Note: This state provisionally applied the treaty as of the date of its ratification or accession; the treaty formally entered into force for the state on 24 December 2014.)
Argentina	3 June 2013	25 September 2014	24 December 2014
Australia	3 June 2013	3 June 2014	24 December 2014
Austria	3 June 2013	3 June 2014	3 June 2014
Bahamas	3 June 2013	25 September 2014	25 September 2014
Barbados	25 September 2013	20 May 2015	18 August 2015
Belgium	3 June 2013	3 June 2014	24 December 2014
Belize	3 June 2013	19 March 2015	17 June 2015
Benin	3 June 2013	7 November 2016	5 February 2017
Bosnia and Herzegovina	25 September 2013	25 September 2014	24 December 2014
Botswana		7 June 2019	7 June 2019
Brazil	3 June 2013	14 August 2018	12 November 2018
Bulgaria	2 July 2013	2 April 2014	24 December 2014
Burkina Faso	3 June 2013	3 June 2014	24 December 2014
Cabo Verde	25 September 2013	23 September 2016	22 December 2016
Cameroon	3 December 2014	18 June 2018	16 September 2018
Canada		19 June 2019	19 June 2019
Central African Republic		7 October 2015	5 January 2016
Chad	25 September 2013	25 March 2015	23 June 2015
Chile	3 June 2013	18 May 2018	16 August 2018
China	20 June 2020	20 June 2020	6 July 2020
Colombia	24 September 2013	15 October 2024	13 January 2025
Costa Rica	3 June 2013	25 September 2013	25 September 2013
Côte d'Ivoire	3 June 2013	26 February 2015	27 May 2015
Croatia	3 June 2013	2 April 2014	24 December 2014
Cyprus	3 June 2013	10 May 2016	8 August 2016
Czech Republic	3 June 2013	25 September 2014	24 December 2014
Denmark	3 June 2013	2 April 2014 (Note: With an exclusion for the Faroe Islands and Greenland.)	2 April 2014
Dominica	1 October 2013	21 May 2015	19 August 2015
Dominican Republic	3 June 2013	11 August 2014	24 December 2014
El Salvador	5 June 2013	2 April 2014	24 December 2014
Estonia	3 June 2013	2 April 2014	2 April 2014
Finland	3 June 2013	2 April 2014	2 April 2014
France	3 June 2013	2 April 2014	24 December 2014
Gabon	25 September 2013	21 September 2022	21 September 2022
Gambia		13 June 2024	11 September 2024
Georgia	25 September 2014	23 May 2016	21 August 2016
Germany	3 June 2013	2 April 2014	2 April 2014
Ghana	24 September 2013	22 December 2015	21 March 2016
Greece	3 June 2013	1 March 2016	30 May 2016
Grenada	3 June 2013	21 October 2013	24 December 2014
Guatemala	24 June 2013	12 July 2016	10 October 2016
Guinea	29 July 2013	21 October 2014	24 December 2014
Guinea-Bissau	26 September 2013	22 October 2018	20 January 2019
Guyana	3 June 2013	4 July 2013	24 December 2014
Honduras	25 September 2013	22 March 2017	20 June 2017
Hungary	3 June 2013	2 April 2014	2 April 2014
Iceland	3 June 2013	2 July 2013	2 July 2013
Ireland	3 June 2013	2 April 2014	24 December 2014
Italy	3 June 2013	2 April 2014	24 December 2014
Jamaica	3 June 2013	3 June 2014	24 December 2014
Japan	3 June 2013	9 May 2014	24 December 2014
Kazakhstan		8 December 2017	8 March 2018
Latvia	3 June 2013	2 April 2014	2 April 2014
Lebanon	27 October 2014	9 May 2019	9 May 2019
Lesotho	25 September 2013	25 January 2016	24 April 2016
Liberia	4 June 2013	21 April 2015	20 July 2015
Liechtenstein	3 June 2013	16 December 2014	24 December 2014
Lithuania	3 June 2013	18 December 2014	24 December 2014
Luxembourg	3 June 2013	3 June 2014	24 December 2014
Madagascar	25 September 2013	22 September 2016	21 December 2016
Malawi	9 January 2014	11 July 2024	9 October 2024
Maldives		27 September 2019	27 September 2019
Mali	3 June 2013	3 December 2013	3 December 2013
Malta	3 June 2013	2 April 2014	24 December 2014
Mauritania	3 June 2013	28 September 2015	27 December 2015
Mauritius		23 July 2015	21 October 2015
Moldova	10 September 2013	28 September 2015	27 December 2015
Mexico	3 June 2013	25 September 2013	25 September 2013
Monaco		30 June 2016	28 September 2016
Montenegro	3 June 2013	18 August 2014	24 December 2014
Mozambique	3 June 2013	14 December 2018	14 December 2018
Namibia	25 September 2014	28 April 2020	28 April 2020
Netherlands	3 June 2013	18 December 2014	24 December 2014
New Zealand	3 June 2013	3 September 2014	3 September 2014
Niger	24 March 2014	27 July 2015	25 October 2015
Nigeria	12 August 2013	12 August 2013	24 December 2014
Niue		6 August 2020	6 August 2020
North Macedonia	25 September 2013	7 March 2014	24 December 2014
Norway	3 June 2013	12 February 2014	12 February 2014
Palau	3 June 2013	8 April 2019	8 April 2019
Panama	3 June 2013	11 February 2014	24 December 2014
Paraguay	19 June 2013	9 April 2015	8 July 2015
Peru	25 September 2013	16 February 2016	16 May 2016
Philippines	25 September 2012	24 March 2022	24 March 2022
Poland	1 July 2013	17 December 2014	24 December 2014
Portugal	3 June 2013	25 September 2014	24 December 2014
Romania	3 June 2013	2 April 2014	24 December 2014
Samoa	25 September 2013	3 June 2014	24 December 2014
San Marino	19 December 2014	29 July 2015	27 October 2015
Saint Kitts and Nevis	5 June 2013	15 December 2014	24 December 2014
Saint Lucia	3 June 2013	25 September 2014	24 December 2014
Saint Vincent and the Grenadines	3 June 2013	3 June 2014	3 June 2014
Sao Tome and Principe	19 December 2014	28 July 2020	28 July 2020
Senegal	3 June 2013	25 September 2014	24 December 2014
Serbia	12 August 2013	5 December 2014	12 August 2013 (Note: Serbia provisionally applied the convention on the date of its signature. It did not formally enter into force for Serbia until 24 December 2014.)
Seychelles	3 June 2013	2 November 2015	31 January 2016
Sierra Leone	25 September 2013	12 August 2014	24 December 2014
Slovakia	10 June 2013	2 April 2014	2 April 2014
Slovenia	3 June 2013	2 April 2014	24 December 2014
South Africa	25 September 2013	22 December 2014	24 December 2014
South Korea	3 June 2013	28 November 2016	26 February 2017
Spain	3 June 2013	2 April 2014	2 April 2014
State of Palestine		27 December 2017	27 March 2018
Suriname	3 June 2013	19 October 2018	17 January 2019
Sweden	3 June 2013	16 June 2014	16 June 2014
Switzerland	3 June 2013	30 January 2015	30 April 2015
Togo	3 June 2013	8 October 2015	6 January 2016
Trinidad and Tobago	3 June 2013	25 September 2013	25 September 2013
Tuvalu	3 June 2013	4 September 2015	3 December 2015
United Kingdom	3 June 2013	2 April 2014	2 April 2014
Uruguay	3 June 2013	25 September 2014	24 December 2014
Zambia	25 September 2013	20 May 2016	18 August 2016

=== Notes ===
A further 26 states have signed but not ratified the treaty:

State	Signed
Angola	24 September 2013
Bahrain	21 November 2013
Bangladesh	26 September 2013
Burundi	3 June 2013
Cambodia	18 October 2013
Comoros	26 September 2013
Republic of the Congo	25 September 2013
Djibouti	3 June 2013
Eswatini	4 September 2013
Haiti	21 March 2014
Israel	18 December 2014
Kiribati	25 September 2013
Libya	9 July 2013
Malaysia	26 September 2013
Mongolia	24 September 2013
Nauru	25 September 2013
Rwanda	5 June 2013
Singapore	5 December 2014
Tanzania	3 June 2013
Thailand	25 November 2014
Turkey	2 July 2013
Ukraine	23 September 2014
United Arab Emirates	9 July 2013
United States (Note: On 26 April 2019, President Donald Trump announced in his speech at an annual NRA meeting that the United States will be withdrawing its signature on the treaty. He signed an order to this effect on stage.)	25 September 2013
Vanuatu	26 July 2013
Zimbabwe	18 December 2014

=== Notes ===
.

== See also ==
- Disarmament
- United Nations Office for Disarmament Affairs
- Mine action
- Small Arms and Light Weapons (SALW)
