= Small arms trade =

Markets of authorized and illicit small arms and light weapons

The small arms trade (also called small arms proliferation and the small arms market) is the markets of both authorized and illicit small arms and light weapons (SALW), as well as their parts, accessories, and ammunition.

== Definition ==
The arms trade, or small arms market, includes both authorized transfers of small arms and light weapons (and their parts, accessories, and bullets) and illicit transfers of such weapons. Small arms and light arms are those that can be transported by one or two people, or carried by pack animal or vehicles, ranging from firearms like pistols and light machine guns to man-portable air-defense systems (MPADS), mortars, and rocket-propelled grenades (RPGs). The trade occurs globally, but is concentrated in areas of armed conflict, violence, and organized crime. In terms of actions that are illicit, this trade involves the illegal trafficking of small arms and the exchange of money and drugs for small arms, which are all commodities that cross borders around the globe. These weapons are not only the choice for a majority of regional conflicts today, but also for many terrorist groups operating around the world. Legal transfers are generally defined as those approved by the involved governments and in accordance with national and international law. Black market (illegal) transfers violate either national or international law and take place without official government authorization. Gray market transfers are those of unclear legality that do not belong in either of the other categories.

In 2003, various international organizations (including Amnesty International, Oxfam International, IANSA), and domestic groups (e.g. the Small Arms Working Group in the U.S.) committed themselves to limiting the trade in and proliferation of small arms around the world. They said that roughly 500,000 people are killed each year by the use of small arms.

== Scope ==
=== Main small arms exporters ===
The Small Arms Survey, an independent research project based in Switzerland, said in its 2003 report that at least 1,134 companies in 98 countries worldwide are involved in some aspect of the production of small arms and ammunition. The largest exporters of small arms by value are the European Union and the United States.

In 2010, the number of countries exporting at least $100 million of small arms annually rose from 12 to 14. The exporters' list was led by the U.S., followed by Italy, Germany, Brazil, Austria, Switzerland, Israel, Russia, South Korea, Belgium, China, Turkey, Spain and the Czech Republic. Sweden dropped off the list because its exports fell from $132 million in 2010 to $44 million in 2011.

In addition, massive exports of small arms by the U.S. (M16), the former Soviet Union (AKM), People's Republic of China (Type 56), Germany (H&K G3), Belgium (FN FAL), and Brazil (FN FAL) during the Cold War took place commercially and to support ideological movements. These small arms have survived many conflicts and many are now in the hands of arms dealers or smaller governments who move them between conflict areas as needed.

=== Main small arms importers ===
The eight countries that imported at least $100 million of small arms in 2011 were the United States, Canada, Germany, Australia, Thailand, United Kingdom, France and Italy. South Korea dropped from the list because its imports fell from $130 million in 2010 to $40 million in 2011.

== United Nations Conference on the Illicit Trade in Small Arms ==
The United Nations Conference on the Illicit Trade in Small Arms and Light Weapons in All Its Aspects was held in New York City from 9–20 July 2001 as decided in United Nations General Assembly Resolution 54/54 V. Preceded by three preparatory committee sessions, the two-week Conference resulted in the adoption of the 'Programme of Action to Prevent, Combat and Eradicate the Illicit Trade in Small Arms and Light Weapons in All Its Aspects.' States are required to report to the United Nations on the progress of their implementation of the UN Programme of Action, commonly known as the PoA.

The extent to which illicit trade in small arms is a primary cause of armed conflict and other serious humanitarian and socioeconomic issues has drawn controversy. The extremely high incidence of small arms violence and the presence of illicitly obtained weapons, especially in areas of turmoil and armed conflict, is undisputed. Because other societal factors play a strong role in creating armed conflict, however, the role of such weapons as a driver of continued violence and disruption has been called into question. Recent scholarship has focused on the root societal causes for violence in addition to the enabling tools. Another target of criticism is the ability to regulate illicit trafficking through international means, since it is unclear exactly what proportion of the weapons are trafficked across borders. The nature of the trafficking enterprise makes exact statistics difficult to determine. Recently, however, researchers have had some success establishing hard numbers within limited parameters.

According to a 2012 Routledge Studies in Peace and Conflict Resolution publication, "the relative importance of diversion or misuse of officially authorised transfers, compared to international entirely illegal black market trafficking has been thoroughly confirmed." The authors go on to elaborate that..."For most developing or fragile states, a combination of weak domestic regulation of authorised firearms possession with theft, loss or corrupt sale from official holdings tends to be a bigger source of weapons concern than illicit trafficking across borders."

The United Nations General Assembly scheduled a review conference in New York which was held from 26 June to 7 July 2006. The Review Conference was plagued by disagreements and states were unable to agree on a substantive outcome document. There have also been four Biennial Meetings of States to consider the implementation of the Programme of Action, in 2003, 2005, 2008 and 2010. The 2008 Biennial Meeting of States resulted in the adoption, by vote, of an Outcome Document focusing on three main issues: international assistance, cooperation and capacity-building; stockpile management and surplus disposal; and illicit brokering in small arms and light weapons. The Fourth Biennial Meeting in 2010 was able to adopt, for the first time by consensus, a substantive Outcome Document which addresses the issue of illicit trade across borders.

A second conference convened from 27 August to 7 September 2012 in New York.

== Data issues ==
Perhaps the greatest barrier to resolving debates over gun policy is the lack of comprehensive data. Although the UN Arms Register tries to keep track of major weapons holdings, there is no global reporting system for small arms. Gathering data for Small Arms and Light Weapons (SALW) can be difficult, considering the transparency of some countries and lack of an organized system within countries. However, as pointed out by the Small Arms Survey, in the past ten years twenty-nine countries have made available a national arms export report. Twenty-five of these countries being European, while only four countries being non-European which include Australia, Canada, South Africa and the United States. While some countries make information available about the small arms of their armed forces and law enforcement agencies; others release estimated data on public ownership. Most refuse to release anything, release rough estimates or simply do not know. Fortunately, to address these issues, the Small Arms Survey's contributors have devised a transparency barometer allowing them to consider each country's cooperation and credibility on shared information.

According to the 2007 edition of the Small Arms Survey, there are at least 639 million firearms in the world, although the actual total is almost certainly considerably higher. This number increases by approximately 8 million every year, for a total economic impact of about US$7 billion annually.

The Small Arms Survey figures are estimates, based on available national figures and field research in particular countries. They give a general sense of trends and the scale of the number of small arms.

== Gun rights issues ==
There is tremendous variability in the adoption of gun control with respect to individual civilian ownership, and international arms control, in different regions across the globe. The right to bear arms is a right guaranteed under the Constitution of the United States and gun ownership for purposes other than hunting is prevalent and socially acceptable. Non-governmental organisations such as IANSA argue that the prevalence of small arms contributes to the cycle of violence between governments and individuals. The U.S. Supreme Court has ruled (most notably in Antonin Scalia's majority opinion in District of Columbia v. Heller) that due to the Second Amendment to the United States Constitution, the legislative and executive branches of both the federal and state governments are limited in their abilities to regulate gun ownership.

U.S. gun rights lobby groups, most notably the National Rifle Association of America and Jews for the Preservation of Firearms Ownership, assert that access to gun ownership is often necessary for self-defence, including defence against government intrusion into private citizen's lives. The JPFO asserts that confiscation of private firearms is a necessary but not sufficient condition for tyranny, and draws parallels between contemporary efforts to register and confiscate guns and the actions of the National Socialist German Workers Party during the lead up to the Second World War. Similarly, gun ownership is widely held by many in Pakistan to be a necessary protection against crime as well as a way through which citizens can participate in law enforcement.

Stephen Halbrook, a Senior Fellow at the Independent Institute and an author and lawyer known for his litigation on behalf of the National Rifle Association, proposed that disarming citizens leaves them defenseless against totalitarian governments (such as Jews in Nazi Germany).

== Impact on Africa ==
The persistence and the complication of wars in Africa is sometimes blamed on small arms proliferation. A comparison between the murder rates in pre- and post-colonial would help determine the impact of small arms proliferation. Africa Researchers for the Small Arms Survey estimate that approximately 30 million firearms are being circulated throughout Africa. This number is much less than the total number of small arms in Europe, estimated to be 84 million. However, the number of small arms isn't as important in comparison to how they are being used. The Small Arms Survey reports that at least 38 different companies are producing small arms in Sub-Saharan Africa, yet indigenous companies are not fulfilling the demands. South Africa is the largest exporter of small arms in the region, but only $6 million in small arms were exported out of the country, while $25 million in small arms were imported into the continent in 2005. Beyond legal trade, the illicit trade of small arms and light weapons also has a great effect on Africa. Many of the illicit trade among small arms in Africa can be attributed to post-conflict removal and movement of weapons. This illegal transfer of weapons from country-to-country has been seen to incite conflict in bordering regions by the same armed groups. An example of this can be seen in the conflicts ranging from Liberia, moving towards Sierra-Leone, the Ivory Coast, and finally to Guinea. Another illicit trade of small arms is seen in craft production. Reports from arms analysts Matt Schroeder and Guy Lamb suggest that the country Ghana has the potential to yield 200,000 new weapons every year.

The consequences of small arms on African people due to international conflicts within Africa, rebel group activities, mercenary groups, and armed gang activities have yet to be fully measured, although Stockholm Peace Research Institute means transparency and information-sharing regarding arms transfers in the region will build trust and confidence. The International Action Network on Small Arms, Saferworld, and Oxfam International put it in perspective when they reported that armed conflict cost Africa $18 billion each year and about US$300 billion between 1990 and 2005. During this period, 23 African nations experienced war: Algeria, Angola, Burundi, Central Africa Republic, Chad, Democratic Republic of Congo (DRC), Republic of Congo, Côte d'Ivoire, Djibouti, Eritrea, Ethiopia, Guinea, Guinea-Bissau, Liberia, Niger, Nigeria, Rwanda, Senegal, Sierra Leone, South Africa, Sudan, and Uganda.

== See also ==
- Arms control
- Arms industry
- Arms Trade Treaty
- Arms trafficking
- Gun control
- Gun ownership
- Gun shop
- IANSA
- International security
- Organized crime
- Pablo Dreyfus
- Small Arms and Light Weapons (SALW)
- Small Arms Survey
- List of most-produced firearms
