= UK Trade & Investment =

UK government department

UK Trade & Investment Welsh: Masnach a Buddsoddiad y DU

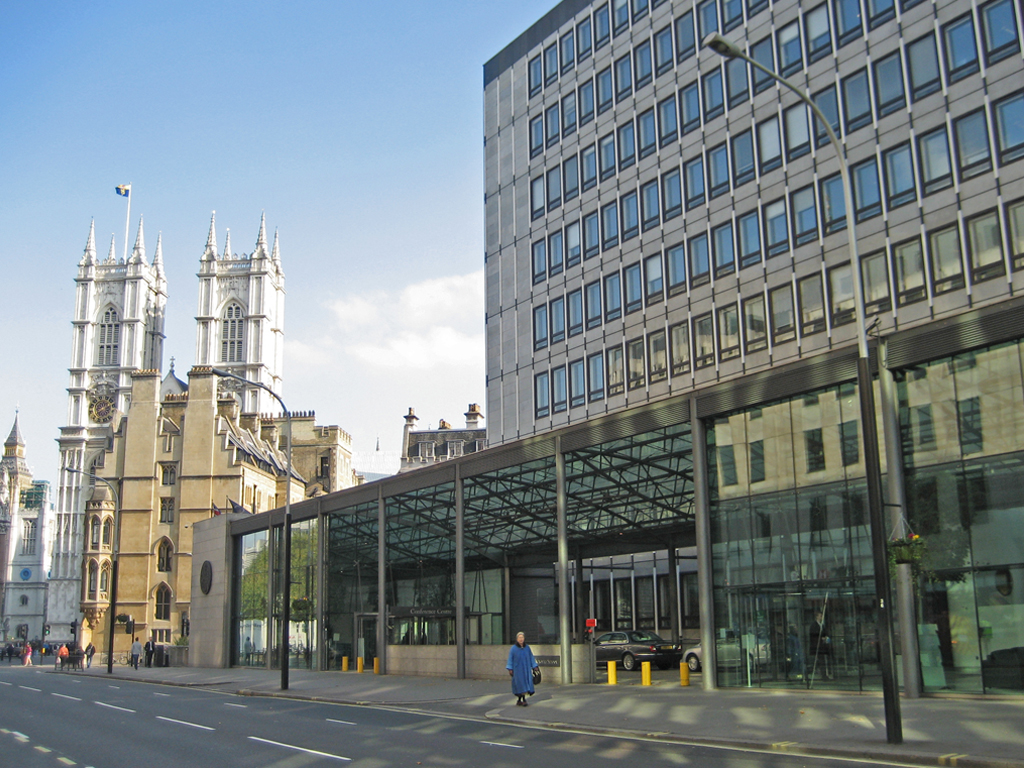

Non-ministerial government department overview
- Formed: October 2003
- Preceding Non-ministerial government department: British Trade International
- Dissolved: July 2016
- Superseding Non-ministerial government department: Department for International Trade
- Jurisdiction: United Kingdom
- Headquarters: 1 Victoria Street, London, SW1H 0ET
- Employees: 2,331
- Annual budget: £270 million (2009-2010)
- Website: www.gov.uk/ukti

UK Trade & Investment (UKTI) was a UK Government department working with businesses based in the United Kingdom to assist their success in international markets, and with overseas investors looking to the UK as an investment destination. It was replaced in July 2016 by the Department for International Trade.

== History ==
UKTI was formed in May 1999 as British Trade International, comprising two parts: Trade Partners UK (for export promotion) and Invest UK (for inward investment - FDI). In October 2003, the former department name and two inner departments merged and became UK Trade & Investment to simplify the outward recognition of the organisation, and possibly to reduce confusion with the two departments.

== Aims ==
To support its aim to "enhance the competitiveness of companies in Britain through overseas trade and investments; and attract a continuing high level of quality foreign direct investment".

== Structure ==
UK Trade & Investment was an international organisation with headquarters in London and Glasgow in Scotland. Across its network UK Trade & Investment employed around 2,400 staff and advisers, including overseas in British Embassies, High Commissions, Consulates and trade offices, and regional offices in the nine English regions

The delivery of many UKTI regional services within the United Kingdom was contracted out to other organisations. In Devon, Cornwall and Somerset, UKTI regional services were delivered by Serco, In China, the China Britain Business Council, another private body, was the provider.

Business and university leaders worked with UKTI as "business ambassadors". They promoted the UK internationally and highlighted trade and investment opportunities. They focused on helping small and medium-sized enterprises (SMEs).

UK Trade & Investment brought together the work of the Foreign & Commonwealth Office and the Department for Business, Energy and Industrial Strategy. The UK Special Representative for International Trade and Investment worked as part of UKTI to promote British business and produce.

UK Trade & Investment had public-private partnership agreements with the Federation of International Trade Associations under which they contributed market research and other reports on GlobalTrade.net.

UK Trade & Investment had an arms-trade branch called UKTI DSO (UK Trade & Investment Defence & Security Organisation) headed by Sir Richard Paniguian.

== See also ==
- Economy of the United Kingdom
- Free trade agreements of the United Kingdom
