= Small arms and light weapons =

Two classes of man-portable weapons

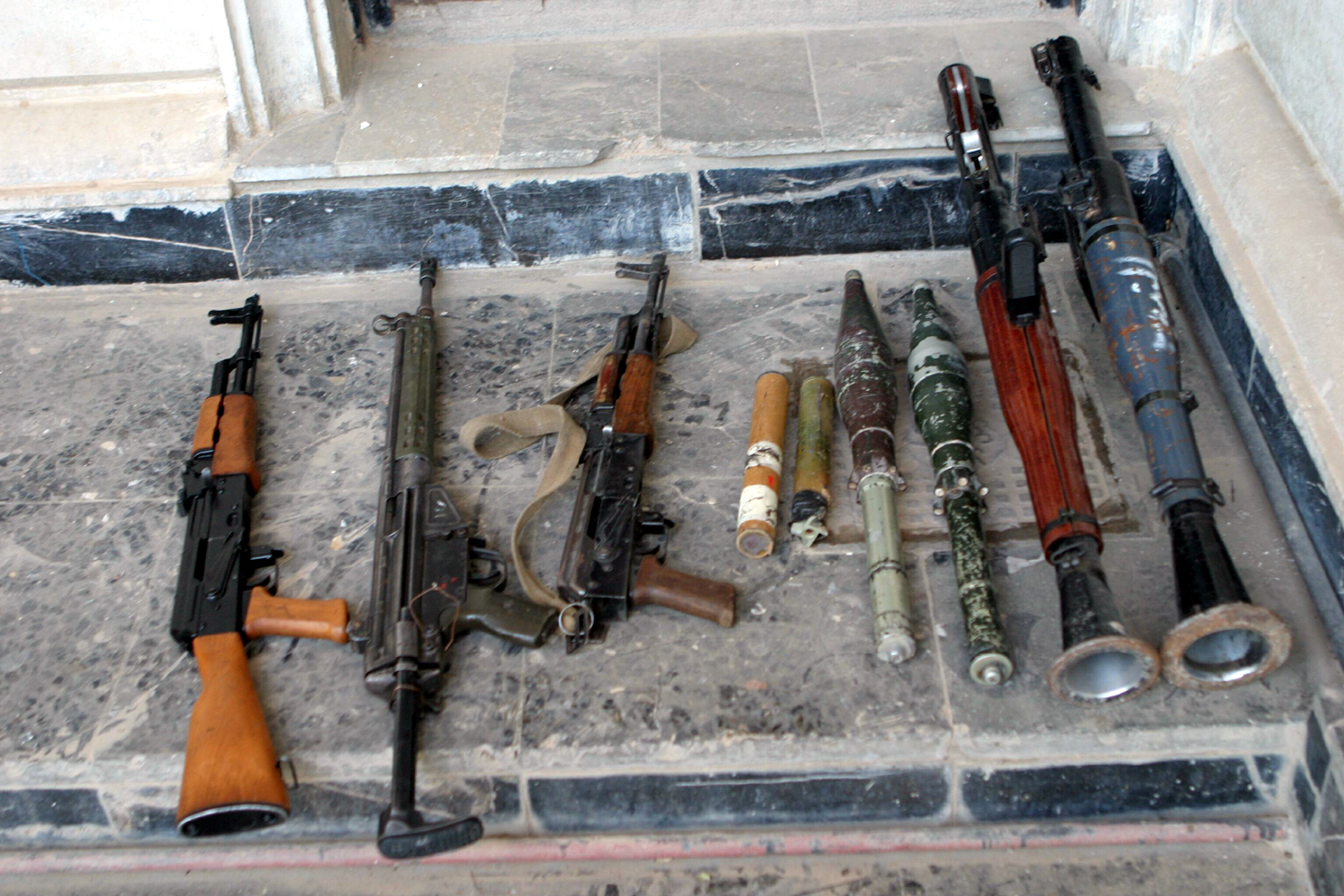
AKMs, H&K G3 and RPG-7s found by U.S. Marines in Fallujah

Small arms and light weapons (SALW), in arms control protocols, are two main classes of man-portable weapons.

Small arms, broadly speaking, are individual-service (i.e. for carry and operation by individual infantrymen) kinetic projectile firearms. These include: handguns (revolvers, pistols, derringers, and machine pistols), muskets, rifled muskets, shotguns, rifles (assault rifles, battle rifles, carbines, designated marksman rifles, short-barreled rifles, sniper rifles, etc.), submachine guns, personal defense weapons, squad automatic weapons, and light machine guns.

Light weapons, broadly speaking, are infantry-portable weapons that are either crew-served kinetic firearms, incendiary devices, or shoot explosive munitions. These include: anti-materiel rifles, anti-tank rifles, general-purpose machine guns, medium machine guns, unmounted heavy machine guns, portable flamethrowers, grenades, rifle grenades, underslung grenade launchers, grenade launchers, automatic grenade launchers, recoilless rifles, rocket-propelled grenades, man-portable anti-tank system, man-portable air-defense systems, and mortars under 100 millimetres (3.9 in) caliber.

Small arms and light weapons also include ammunition, explosives, hand grenades, land mines, and any other man portable weapons not listed above.

In contrast, the term "heavy weapons" generally refers to any other weapon systems that are too cumbersome for foot transportation and hence have to rely on fixed mounting platforms installed upon wheeled frames/vehicles, vessels, aircraft or fortifications for effective operation.

== Definition by international legal conventions ==
According to the United Nations Office on Drugs and Crime, the international framework on firearms is composed of three main instruments: the Firearms Protocol, the United Nations Programme of Action to Prevent, Combat and Eradicate the Illicit Trade in Small Arms and Light Weapons in All Its Aspects (Programme of Action, or PoA) and the International Instrument to Enable States to Identify and Trace, in a Timely and Reliable Manner, Illicit Small Arms and Light Weapons (International Tracing Instrument, or ITI), where only the Firearms Protocol is legally binding.

The ITI, adopted by the United Nations General Assembly on 8 December 2005, defines small arms and light weapons as:

any man-portable lethal weapon that expels or launches, is designed to expel or launch, or may be readily converted to expel or launch a shot, bullet or projectile by the action of an explosive, excluding antique small arms and light weapons or their replicas. Antique small arms and light weapons and their replicas will be defined in accordance with domestic law. In no case will antique small arms and light weapons include those manufactured after 1899:

(a) "Small arms" are, broadly speaking, weapons designed for individual use. They include, inter alia, revolvers and self-loading pistols, rifles and carbines, sub-machine guns, assault rifles and light machine guns;

(b) "Light weapons" are, broadly speaking, weapons designed for use by two or three persons serving as a crew, although some may be carried and used by a single person. They include, inter alia, general purpose or universal machine guns, medium machine guns, heavy machine guns, rifle grenades, under-barrel grenade launchers and mounted grenade launchers, portable anti-aircraft guns, portable anti-tank guns, recoilless rifles, man portable launchers of anti-tank missile and rocket systems, man portable launchers of anti-aircraft missile systems, and mortars of a calibre of less than 100 millimetres.

Such arms control policies and treaties are focused on international arms trafficking (importation and export), and in the standardization of laws, protocols and sharing of law enforcement information and best practices across nations to prevent illicit arms sales. They also focus on terrorism, arms proliferation as a humanitarian concern, disarmament in the face of extreme violence, and cases of ameliorating anarchy, civil war and international conflict. SALW provisions are generally not oriented towards imposing or enforcing domestic national or local legislation of legitimate gun ownership or sale.

== United Nations SALW control efforts ==
Small arms and light weapons are used in conflicts around the world, causing injury and death. Small arms control was first broached by UN Resolution A/RES/46/36 (December 1991), which was expanded upon by A/RES/50/70 (January 1996). This latter resolution mandated a panel of experts to research the type of small arms and light weapons being used in the world's conflicts and to study which weapons might apply to fall under an arms control regime. The recommendations of expert reports returned to the General Assembly, A/52/298 (1997) and A/54/258 (1999) led to a July 2001 United Nations Conference on the Illicit Trade in Small Arms, with a follow-up in July 2006.

On 26 September 2013 the UN Security Council passed Resolution 2117, which urged nations to remain committed to small arms embargoes and SALW control protocols.

Work on SALW via the United Nations is coordinated by the Office for Disarmament Affairs (UNODA), though the UN Coordinating Action on Small Arms (CASA) mechanism, which comprises 21 UN departments and agencies working on different aspects of small arms and light weapons control. The United Nations Institute for Disarmament Research (UNIDIR), carries out research in arms control affairs and has published many articles and books related to small arms and light weapons.

On 2 April 2013, the UN General Assembly voted overwhelmingly to adopt the Arms Trade Treaty (ATT) to govern the legal international trade in many types of conventional weapons, from warships and aircraft to small arms and light weapons. A basic obligation of the treaty is that all States Parties should establish or maintain controls in the area. In this way, the treaty also helps the international community to address unregulated or illegal trade in conventional weapons. The treaty opened for signature on 3 June 2013. To date, two-thirds of UN member states have signed the treaty (130 states), and 72 have ratified it. The treaty entered into force on 24 December 2014.

== Global distribution of small arms ==
In 2018, Small Arms Survey reported that there are over one billion small arms distributed globally, of which 857 million (about 85 percent) are in civilian hands. U.S. civilians alone account for 393 million (about 46 percent) of the worldwide total of civilian held firearms. This amounts to "120.5 firearms for every 100 residents." The world's armed forces control about 133 million (about 13 percent) of the global total of small arms, of which over 43 percent belongs to two countries – the Russian Federation (30.3 million) and the People's Republic of China (27.5 million). Law enforcement agencies control about 22.7 million (about 2 percent) of the global total of small arms.

== See also ==
- List of firearms
- List of most-produced firearms
- Small arms
- Small Arms Survey
- Small arms trade
- Arms Trade Treaty
- Gun control
- Gun politics
