= Brazilian Association for Self-Defense =

Private civil association

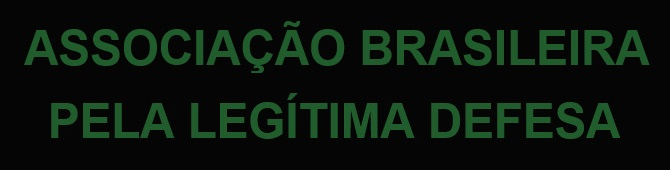
- Abbreviation: ABPLD
- Founded: August 4, 2016; 10 years ago
- Type: Non-governmental, nonprofit organization
- Purpose: To organize society in the fight for the right of good people to the tame and peaceful possession of firearms, for self-defense, home-defense or third parties-defense
- Headquarters: São Paulo, São Paulo
- Founder: Jairo Paes de Lira
- President: Diogo Chogo Waki
- Website: www.pelalegitimadefesa.org.br/npld/

The Brazilian Association for Self-Defense (in Portuguese: "Associação Brasileira Pela Legítima Defesa" – ABPLD) is a non-governmental, nonprofit organization, created in 2016, with the main objective of guaranteeing citizens the right to keep and bear arms for self-defense, home-defense or third parties-defense.

== Historic ==
ABPLD, was "de facto" founded on October 23, 2015, the date on which the tenth anniversary of the great democratic victory was celebrated in the 2005 referendum, is the historic successor to the "Movement for Self-Defense" (in Portuguese: "Movimento Pela Legítima Defesa"), which in turn brought together several associations, informal groups and individuals.

This coalition that gave rise to ABPLD had the effective participation of the "Brazilian Association of Rifle Shooters" (in Portuguese: "Associação Brasileira dos Atiradores de Rifle" – ABAR), the "National Association of Arms Owners and Merchants" (in Portuguese: "Associação Nacional dos Proprietários e Comerciantes de Armas" – ANPCA), the "Paulista Association for the Defense of Individual Rights and Freedoms" (in Portuguese: "Associação Paulista de Defesa dos Direitos e Liberdades Individuais" – APADDI), "Paulista Federation of Practical Shooting" (in Portuguese: "Federação Paulista de Tiro Prático" – FPTP), "RAM Metal Silhouettes Club" (in Portuguese: "RAM Clube de Silhuetas Metálicas" – RCSM), "Safari Club International" (SCI Brazil), and several individual collaborators.

== Actions ==
Since its foundation, ABPLD, through its presidents, has promoted and disseminated its ideas and values, defending that the "weapon is the most effective instrument for defense".

Both ABPLD and the "Center for Research in Law and Security" (in Portuguese: "Centro de Pesquisas em Direito e Segurança" – CEPEDES), were critical of the text of the decree edited by President Jair Bolsonaro on January 15, 2019, as they considered it to fall short of expectations, leaving room for many dubious interpretations.

== Organization ==
ABPLD Board:

- President: Diogo Chogo Waki
- Secretary-General: Jairo Paes de Lira
- chief financial officer: José Luiz de Sanctis
- Director of Associative Affairs: Hudson Costa André Caruso
- Legal Director: Reynaldo Arantes

== Other similar groups ==
Some groups that defend the right to keep and bear arms in other countries:

- Argentina: Asociación de Legítimos Usuarios y Tenedores de Armas de la República Argentina (ALUTARA)
- Chile: Agrupación Nacional por la Tenencia Responsable de Armas
- Colombia: Asociación Colombiana de Usuarios de Armas;
- Spain: National Arms Association of Spain (ANARMA)
- Switzerland: proTell
- United States: National Rifle Association of America (NRA)
- Uruguay: Asociación Uruguaya de Tenedores Responsables de Armas de Fuego

== See also ==
- Viva Brazil Movement
- Gun Owners of America
- National Association for Gun Rights
- Jews for the Preservation of Firearms Ownership
- Overview of gun laws by nation
