= Firearms license =

License that allows the licensee to buy, own, possess, or carry a firearm

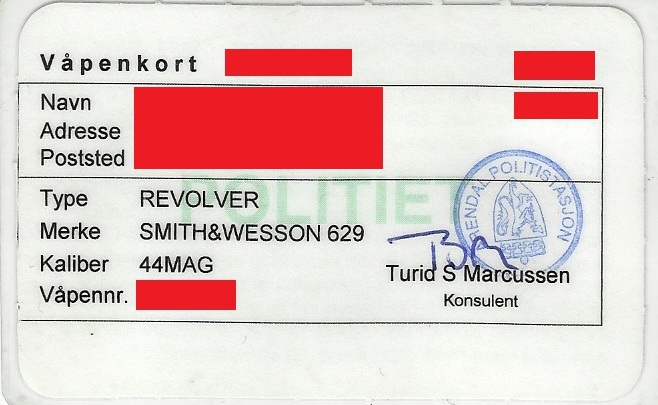
A Norwegian firearms license for a .44 Magnum revolver, with name and address of the owner, as well as firearm type, brand, caliber and serial number.

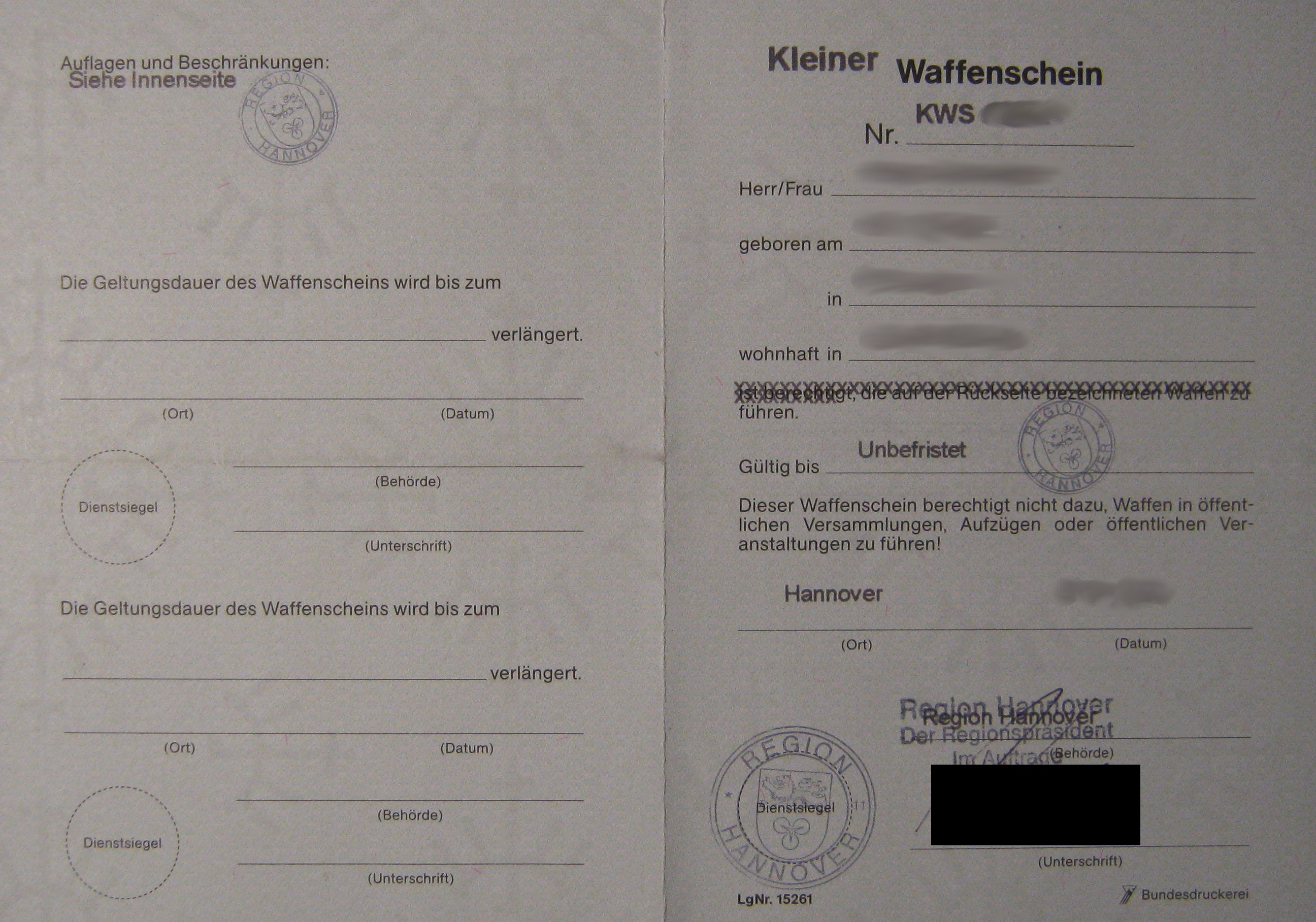
A German firearms license.

A firearms license (also known as a gun license; or licence in British English) is a license or permit issued by a government authority (typically by the police) of a jurisdiction, that allows the licensee to buy, own, possess, or carry a firearm, often subject to a number of conditions or restrictions, especially with regard to storage requirements or the completion of a firearms safety course, as well as background checks, etc. Firearms licenses are not required in all jurisdictions. Additionally, some countries or states may require by law a "permit-to-purchase" in order to buy handguns or firearms. A licence may also be required to buy ammunition.

The permit or license scope varies according to what firearm(s) or activity(s) it allows the holder to legally do with the firearm. Some jurisdictions may require a firearm license to own a firearm, to engage in hunting, target shooting or collecting, or to carry a concealed firearm, or operate a business (such as being a gun dealer or a gunsmith). Some jurisdictions may require separate licenses for rifles, shotguns or handguns.

The requirement to have a firearm license is usually in addition to a requirement for firearm registration. For example, gun laws in Australia require firearms to be registered by serial number to the owner, who holds a firearm licence.

== Countries with firearms licensing ==
- Australia
- Brazil
- Bulgaria
- Canada
- Czech Republic
- Denmark
- Finland
- France (only northern France)
- Germany
- India
- Ireland
- Israel
- Italy
- New Zealand
- North Macedonia
- Norway
- Pakistan
- Paraguay
- Perú
- Poland
- Philippines
- Romania
- Russia
- Slovakia
- South Africa
- Spain
- Sweden
- Turkey
- United Kingdom
- United States of America (for some states and/or municipalities)
- Uruguay
- Zimbabwe

== See also ==
- European Firearms Pass
- Overview of gun laws by nation
