= Bene Barbosa =

Brazilian lawyer (born 1970)

- Born: 1970 (age 55–56); São Paulo, São Paulo, Brazil
- Occupations: Activist and consultant
- Notable work: Viva Brazil Movement; They Lied to Me About Disarmament
- Website: livrariadobene.com.br

Benedito Gomes Barbosa Junior (born July 3, 1970, in São Paulo), better known as "Bene Barbosa", is a Brazilian public security activist and specialist. He is also president of the NGO Viva Brazil Movement.

He was one of the leaders, during the 2005 referendum, in the defense of the vote against the disarmament statute, in addition to being the author, together with Flávio Quintela, of the bestseller "They Lied to Me About Disarmament". Bene Barbosa has also become one of the exponents in the defense of individual rights in Brazil, regarding the constitutional right of self-defense.

== Biography ==
Barbosa was born in the city of São Paulo on July 3, 1970. He holds a bachelor's degree in Legal Sciences and specializes in Public Security, armaments and ammunition. He has been active in this area since the 1990s, especially in relation to the constitutional right of self-defense through the civil right to possession and possession of firearms by Brazilian citizens. He also serves as a teacher and consultant.

In 2004, he began to dedicate himself fully to the area of public security when he founded the Non-Governmental Organization Movimento Viva Brasil, which has the purpose of defending the citizen's right to own and bear arms, in addition to combating policies and theses related to disarmament. civil. Since then, the organization has been a national and international reference in this area. The organization has trade partners, manufacturers, distributors and arms sellers, in addition to firing clubs, according to the organization's website.

In 2005, he was invited to join the Parliamentary Front for the Right to Self-Defense and became one of the most important leaders of the victorious campaign for "No", in the referendum held in 2005 in relation to article 35, which deals with the restriction on trade in weapons and ammunition, of Law No. 10,826/2003, called the "Disarmament Statute". At the time, the referendum won 63.94% of votes against this ban.

In April 2011, the Viva Brazil Movement, through its president, Bene Barbosa, made a presentation at the Chamber of Deputies of Brazil called "Control and inspection x Public Disarmament Policy", where he disputed data on the increase in rates of homicides are related to the sale of legal weapons to civilians. He also contested the claim that access to weapons by CACs (Collectors, Shooters and Hunters), is less enforced or that there is greater ease.

Since 2012, he started to defend the House of Representatives Bill 3,722/2012, authored by federal deputy Rogério Peninha Mendonça (PMDB/SC), which proposes a new weapon control system, revoking much of the content of the current Disarmament Statute. According to him, "more rational and convergent with the popular will, giving back to the citizen the possibility of self-defense and returning to the variants of public security the criminal inexistent fear of the victim's reaction today". To this end, he has frequently participated in public hearings in the National Congress in defense of the project, in addition to several exhibitions and debates related to the theme at events across the country.

In November 2014, Barbosa participated, with members of the Defense Institute, in the public hearing on weapons in the Chamber of Deputies in Brasília to address bill 3,722/2012 that was trying to revoke the "Disarmament Statute".

In 2015, he and journalist Flávio Quintela released the book "Lied to me about disarmament", to refute the arguments most used by defenders of civil disarmament, for example, that unarmed countries are safer, that the government wants to disarm people because you care about them, that weapons need to be controlled to facilitate the solution of crimes, among others. According to the authors, the book is the result of a research effort, in which real information about the benefits that weapons bring to society is exposed. To this end, they cite studies, data, facts and other information that contradict the theses surrounding civil disarmament. The book obtained positive reviews by the majority of its readers and was even listed among the best sellers.

Bene Barbosa is also the author of hundreds of articles published in various journals in the country and has frequently defended his positions in interviews in the press and participation in programs of various media outlets in the country. He has also regularly participated in conferences, symposia, exhibitions and fairs across the country. In addition, he has frequently participated in public hearings in the National Congress in relation to PL No. 3,722/2012 and issues associated with the constitutional right of citizen's self-defense.

In November 2015, he was awarded by the City Council of Rio de Janeiro with the "Pedro Ernesto" Medal, awarded for the relevant services provided in the area of Brazilian public security. In the same year, he was awarded the "Tiradentes" Medal of honor to merit, by the Legislative Assembly of the State of Rio de Janeiro.

As of 2016, the federal government has been issuing rules that make the disarmament statute measures more flexible. Among the recent changes, there is an increase in the deadline for the validity of the firearm registration, from 3 to 5 years, in addition to the reduction of documents required for approval of renewal of registration. For Bene Barbosa, one of the supporters of these measures, the changes "are an indication that the policy of disarmament adopted in recent years by the federal government, from FH to Dilma Rousseff, needs to be changed because it has not resulted in the fight against violence."

In 2017, Bene Barbosa participated in the documentary Desarmados (2017), by director and producer Lion Andreassa. The feature film discusses discussions around the constitutionality of citizen's self-defense and the role of firearms as instruments for citizens to exercise this right. According to Andreassa, the people who participated in the documentary have thoughts that reflect opinions from both sides of the political spectrum, that is, against and in favor of civil disarmament. The financing of the work came from the managers themselves and from an amount collected through crowdfunding.

In September 2017, he was invited to the XXX meeting of the Mercosur working group on firearms and ammunition, which took place at the Itamaraty Palace, in Brasília. On that occasion, among other notes, he argued that substantial arms smuggling into Brazil was the effect, not the cause, of the country's excess crime, since Brazilian criminals, who go unpunished or out of reach of Brazilian authorities, feel free to smuggle weapons from neighboring countries.

He also writes a column for the Mato Grosso newspaper O Livre.

== Publications ==
- Barbosa, Bene; Quintela, Flavio (2015). Mentiram Para Mim Sobre o Desarmamento. Vide Editorial. ISBN 978-8-56739-459-6.

== Awards ==
- Pedro Ernesto Medal
- Tiradentes Medal
- M.M.D.C. Medal

== See also ==
- PROARMAS
- Overview of gun laws by nation
