= ABATE (gun rights association) =

Private civil association

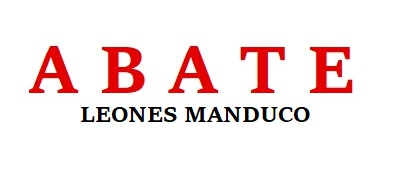
- Associação Brasileira de Atiradores Civis
- Founded: February 19, 2014; 12 years ago
- Type: Non-governmental, nonprofit organization
- Purpose: Defend and expand the rights of gun owners in Brazil as a way to promote civil liberties.
- Headquarters: Araraquara, São Paulo
- Founder: Arnaldo Adasz
- Vice President: Péricles Tavares Castellar
- Website: abate.org.br

ABATE, officially Brazilian Association of Civil Shooters is a non-governmental, non-profit organization, created in 2014, headquartered in the municipality of Araraquara, São Paulo, whose main purpose is to defend and expand rights of gun owners in Brazil as a way to promote civil liberties.

== History ==
ABATE was founded in February 2014, and soon became recognized in the Brazilian arms scene. He participated in commissions in the National Congress, meetings of the Consultative Council of the Brazilian Army, presentation of new Draft Laws.

In 2015, ABATE created the "Urban Combat Course", with several editions taking place throughout the national territory.

Based on this course, in 2016, ABATE created the division known as "Sport Tactical Shooting Division" ("Divisão de Tiro Tático Desportivo" DTTD in Portuguese), as a shooting sport practice.

== Actions ==
In May 2018, Arnaldo Adasz, President of ABATE, was a speaker at the public hearing of the "PUBLIC SECURITY COMMITTEE AND THE FIGHT AGAINST ORGANIZED CRIME" with the theme "ILLEGAL PRISONS OF CACs".

In October 2018, Arnaldo Adasz, President of ABATE, participated in the 3rd thematic chamber meeting of the Brazilian Army's COLOG (Logistic Command), where several items were discussed aiming at reducing bureaucracy and simplifying procedures related mainly to CACs (Hunter Shooter Collector)

== Defeats in justice ==
Despite their efforts to obtain in court the approval of "Registration Certificate" ("Certificado de Registro" CR in Portugues) for ABATE members taking their courses, there was an unfavorable court decision in this regard.

In the process in which it demanded the unconstitutionality of the state law that prohibited any type of hunting in the São Paulo State, including "javali" and "javaporco" (which cause innumerable environmental problems), despite ABATE's efforts in this regard, due to non-presentation of individual authorization or decision in an assembly legitimizing the intended procedural representation, the claim was dismissed.

== See also ==
- Viva Brazil Movement
- Gun Owners of America
- National Rifle Association of America
- National Association for Gun Rights
- Jews for the Preservation of Firearms Ownership
- Overview of gun laws by nation
