= Defense Institute =

Private civil association

Defense Institute "Instituto Defesa"
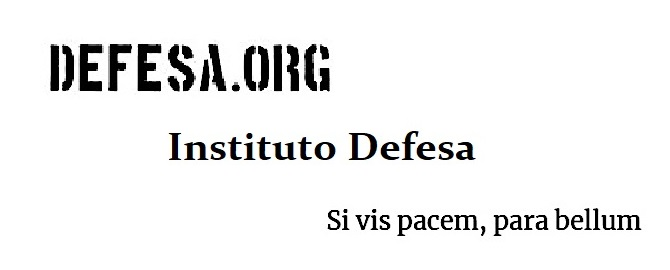
- Founded: 27 December 2013; 12 years ago
- Type: Non-governmental, nonprofit organization
- Purpose: To organize society in the struggle for the inalienable right of gun rights, the greatest guarantor of all other rights considered to be fundamental
- Headquarters: Curitiba, Paraná
- Founder: Lucas Martins da Silveira
- President: Lucas Martins da Silveira
- Website: defesa.org/dwp/

The Defense Institute (in Portuguese: "Instituto Defesa") is a non-governmental, nonprofit organization in Brazil created in 2013, with the main objective of guaranteeing citizens the inalienable right to keep and bear arms.

== Overview ==
The Defense Institute was created in response to the government's failure to comply with the popular will expressed in the result of the 2005 referendum, which rejected the proposal to restrict access to the right to keep and bear arms.

== Actions ==
In 2016, the Defense Institute, in partnership with the IMBEL ("Brazilian Military Material Industry"), started producing videos of that company's guns.

On 28 and 29 September 2019, the Defense Institute organized and promoted the "IV Regional Meeting of the DEFESA Institute", in the city of Salvador, Bahia.

On 5 October 2019, the Defense Institute organized and promoted the "I Meeting of the DEFESA Institute in PARANÁ", in the city of Quatro Barras, Paraná.

The Defense Institute has been promoting and conducting training courses and events related to the subject of self-defense.

The Defense Institute has also been promoting political actions and has been advocating since 2011 the commercialization of firearms without barriers imposed by the State.

On 15 October 2020, the Defense Institute, in partnership with the shooting club "Tactical Shoot", promoted the 1st SHOOTING OPEN TOURNAMENT, in the city of Botucatu, São Paulo.

== Organization ==
Defense Institute Board:

- President: Lucas Silveira
  - Secretary: Sandra Serpe
  - Treasurer: Danieli Cristina Heinemann
  - General Counsel: Hudson Costa André Caruso
  - Legislative Advisory: Reynaldo Arantes
- Regional Directors:
  - Vinícius Morais (Passo Fundo/RS)
  - Tiago Farias (Americana/SP)
- State Directors:
  - Alexandre Lima (MG)
  - Bruno Guimarães (PR)
  - Daniel Ribeiro (SP)
  - Caio Lausi (SP)
  - Diogo Pasuch (RS)
  - João Corrêa (RS)
  - Jovanka Leal (SE)
  - Leopoldo de Aguiar (MS)
  - Solange Lopes (MS)
  - Luciana Valle (GO)
  - Eduardo Azeredo (BA)
  - Lucas Parrini (RJ)
  - Marliel Costa (AC)

== Other similar groups ==
Some groups that defend the right to keep and bear arms in other countries:

- Argentina: Asociación de Legítimos Usuarios y Tenedores de Armas de la República Argentina (ALUTARA)
- Chile: Agrupación Nacional por la Tenencia Responsable de Armas
- Colombia: Asociación Colombiana de Usuarios de Armas;
- Spain: National Arms Association of Spain (ANARMA)
- Switzerland: proTell
- United States: National Rifle Association of America (NRA)
- Uruguay: Asociación Uruguaya de Tenedores Responsables de Armas de Fuego

== See also ==
- Viva Brazil Movement
- Gun Owners of America
- National Association for Gun Rights
- Jews for the Preservation of Firearms Ownership
- Overview of gun laws by nation
