= Gun control in the Third Reich =

Gun Control in the Third Reich may refer to:

- History of firearms restrictions in Germany
- Gun Control in the Third Reich (book)
