= International Association for the Protection of Civilian Arms Rights =

Association of gun rights organizations

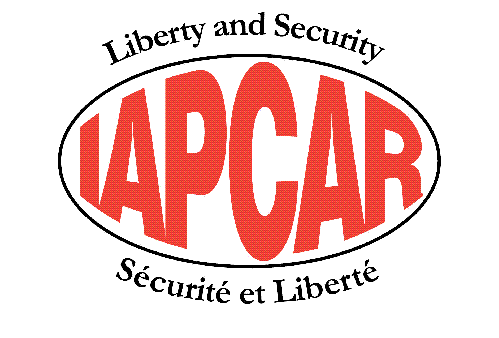
- Logo
- Headquarters: Bellevue, Washington
- Members: 29 Groups
- Executive Director: Philip Watson
- managing director: Mark Barnes
- Website: iapcar.org

International Association for the Protection of Civilian Arms Rights (IAPCAR) is an association of gun rights organizations, with over 29 member organizations.

== Member organizations ==
The International Association for the Protection of Civilian Arms Rights has 29 groups from 21 countries on 6 continents representing tens of millions of firearm owners.

- A2S5 Coalition (Philippines)
- ALUTARA (Argentina)
- The Society of Gun Culture Enhancement in Israel (Israel)
- Association of Bullet and Practical Shooting (Belarus)
- Canada's National Firearms Association (Canada)
- Canadian Institute for Self Defense (Canada)
- Canadian Institute for Legislative Action (Canada)
- Canadian Shooting Sports Association (Canada)
- Canadian Sporting Arms and Ammunition Association (Canada)
- Citizens Committee for the Right to Keep and Bear Arms (United States)
- Firearms Owners Association of Australia (Australia)
- FISAT (Italy)
- Knife Rights (United States)
- Lone Star Shooting Association (United States)
- Movimento Viva Brasil (Brazil)
- National Arms Association of Spain (Spain)
- National Association for Gun Rights India (India)
- National Muzzle Loading Rifle Association (United States)
- PEFOP (Greece)
- Practical Shooting Association (Moldova)
- Pro Defensa (Costa Rica)
- Pro Legal (Germany)
- ProTell (Switzerland)
- Right to Arms (Russia)
- Second Amendment Foundation (United States)
- South African Gun Owners Association (South Africa)
- Sport and Practical Shooting Club (Austria)
- Taiwan Defensive Firearms Association (Taiwan)
- Ukrainian Gun Owners Association (Ukraine)
- UNPACT (France)

== Recent campaigns ==
IAPCAR has recently mounted a strong campaign in opposition to the United Nations Arms Trade Treaty. One of the co-founders of IAPCAR, Julianne Vernsel, submitted testimony to the Arms Trade Treaty conference objecting to the exclusion of civilian's arms rights from the treaty. They also strongly objected to the lack of acknowledgement or protection of civilian arms rights or recognizing the right to self-defense in its enforceable language.

== See also ==
- Overview of gun laws by nation
