= Viva Brazil Movement =

Viva Brazil Movement "Movimento Viva Brasil"
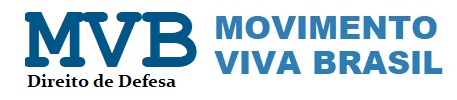
- Abbreviation: MVB
- Founded: 2004; 22 years ago
- Purpose: To preserve, protect, and defend the armed self defense rights
- Headquarters: São Paulo, São Paulo, Brazil
- Founder: Bene Barbosa
- Website: www.mvb.org.br

The Viva Brazil Movement (in Portuguese: "Movimento Viva Brasil") is a Brazilian non-profit association founded in 2004, with the objective of "defending the constitutional right of civilians to keep and bear arms destined for self-defense, shooting sports and arms collection".

== Overview ==
The Viva Brasil Movement was reported on in 2005 for its role in the "no" campaign in the referendum on the ban on the sale of firearms and ammunition.

With the victory of "no" in that referendum, the majority of the Brazilian electorate decided to continue the trade in firearms and ammunition. Since then, it has become one of the most important civil rights entities to defend the possession of small arms by citizens and sport shooters.

== Actions ==
The Viva Brasil Movement strongly criticizes the excessive bureaucracy imposed on citizens who wish to acquire weapons legally. Its members claim that this bureaucracy stimulates the illegal market. They also argue that criminals do not acquire weapons through the legal market, even appealing to clandestine firearm factories to arm themselves. Together with other groups, such as the "Instituto Defesa" ("Defense Institute"), he defends the repeal of the "Estatuto do Desarmamento" ("Disarmament Statute"), understanding that, by insisting on its maintenance, the government disrespects the decision taken by the majority of voters in 2005.

In April 2011, the Viva Brasil Movement, through its president, Bene Barbosa, made a presentation at the Chamber of Deputies of Brazil called "Control and inspection x Public Disarmament Policy", where he disputed data on the increase in rates of homicides are related to the sale of legal weapons to civilians. He also contested the claim that access to weapons by CACs (Collectors, Shooters and Hunters), is less enforced or that there is greater ease.

Bill 3722 of 2012 authored by federal deputy Rogério Mendonça (PMDB-SC) intends to change the "Disarmament Statute" for the "Good Citizen", making the legislation adequate to the result of the 2005 Referendum.

Currently, in Brazil, the possession of firearms is only allowed for people over the age of 25, with a clean record in the police and that justifies their real need to have a firearm.

== Organization ==
Its current president is an activist, a bachelor of law, a specialist in public security, a writer and professor Bene Barbosa.

== Other similar groups ==
Some groups that defend the right to carry weapons in other countries:

- Argentina: Asociación de Legítimos Usuarios y Tenedores de Armas de la República Argentina (ALUTARA)
- Chile: Asociación Nacional por la Tenencia Responsable de Armas (ANTRA)
- Colombia: Asociación Colombiana de Usuarios de Armas
- Spain: National Arms Association of Spain (ANARMA)
- Switzerland: ProTell
- United States: National Rifle Association of America (NRA)
- Uruguay: Asociación Uruguaya de Tenedores Responsables de Armas de Fuego

== See also ==
- PROARMAS
- Gun Owners of America
- National Association for Gun Rights
- Jews for the Preservation of Firearms Ownership
- Overview of gun laws by nation
