= Marcos Pollon =

Brazilian politician

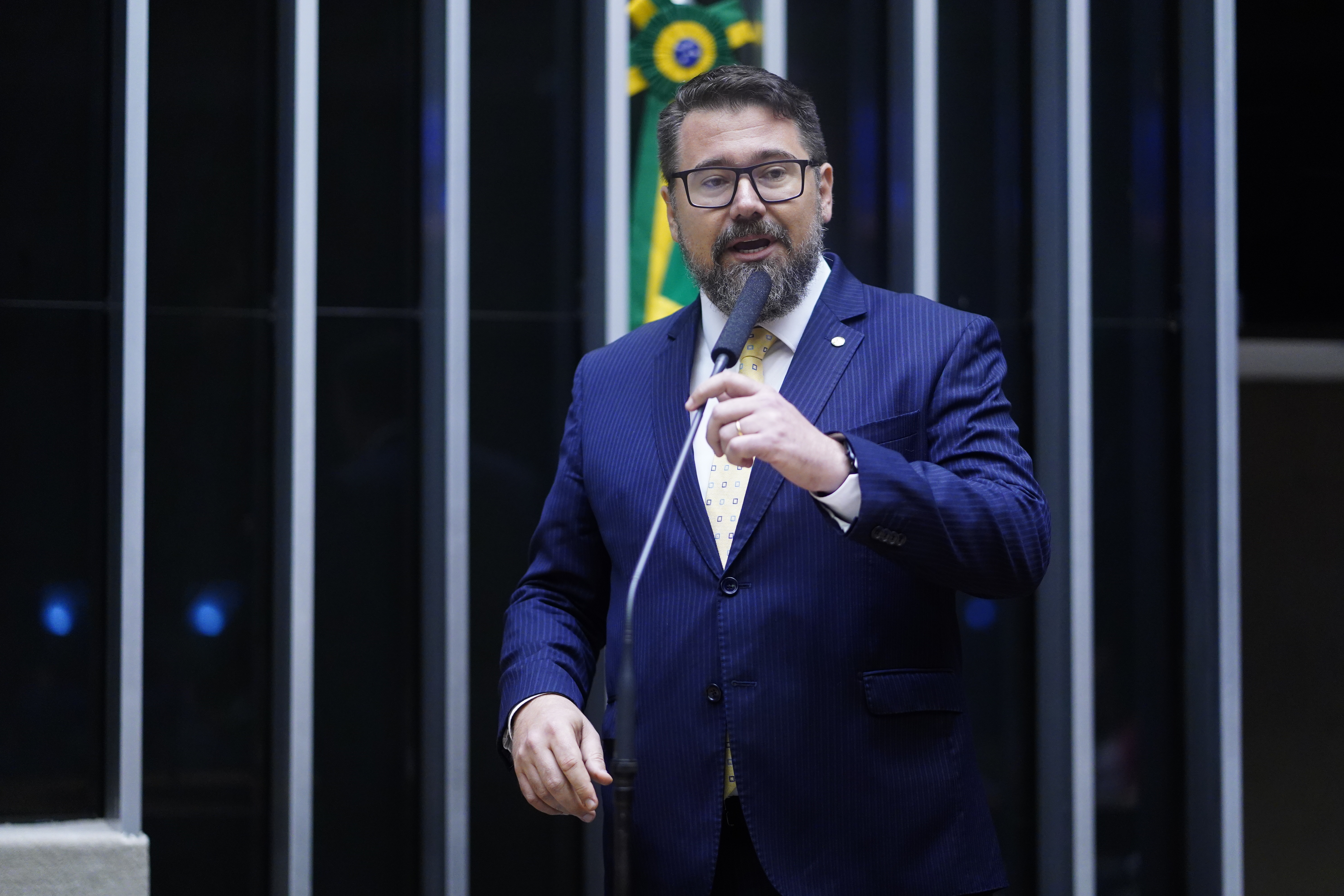
- Pollon in 2023

Member of the Chamber of Deputies
- Incumbent
- Assumed office 1 January 2023
- Constituency: Mato Grosso do Sul

Personal details
- Born: Marcos Sborowski Pollon; 19 January 1981 (age 45) Dourados, Mato Grosso do Sul, Brazil
- Party: PL (2022–present)
- Profession: Lawyer
- Website: www.marcospollon.com.br

Marcos Sborowski Pollon (born 19 January 1981) is a Brazilian lawyer, activist, YouTuber, digital influencer and politician, currently affiliated to Partido Liberal (PL). In the 2022 elections, in his first candidacy he was elected federal deputy for Mato Grosso do Sul, being the federal deputy with the most votes in the state.

Pollon is the founder of the PROARMAS, which is currently the largest pro-gun association in Brazil. Some of the association's main objectives are the promotion of actions aimed at guaranteeing the right of citizens to legal access, acquisition, possession and carrying of firearms and guaranteeing the right of self-defense.

== Biography ==
Pollon was born in Dourados, Brazil. He has a degree in law and specializes in agribusiness. He was a professor at the Federal University of Mato Grosso do Sul (UFMS), having started teaching in 2003. He worked on issues related to agriculture and was a member of the Agrarian Affairs and Agribusiness Committee of the Lawyers Association in his state.

In 2005, he founded the Academy of Procedural Law and the Conservative Institute of Mato Grosso do Sul. He is a pro-armament activist, having created and founded the PROARMAS in 2020. He is a close friend of the Bolsonaro family and claims to be "pro God, pro-life and pro-guns". Federal deputy Eduardo Bolsonaro (PL-SP) supported his candidacy for federal deputy for the state of Mato Grosso do Sul, including being present at his launch. In the 2022 elections, Pollon, in his first candidacy, he was elected as a federal deputy, with 103,111 votes, being the candidate for federal deputy with the most votes in Mato Grosso do Sul.

== See also ==
- PROARMAS
- Collectors, Shooters and Hunters
