= Gun Control in the Third Reich =

2013 book

- Cover of the first edition (paperback)
- Author: Stephen P. Halbrook
- Cover artist: Denise Tsui
- Language: English
- Genre: Non-fiction
- Publisher: The Independent Institute
- Publication date: Paperback-November 2013, Hardcover-January 2014
- Publication place: United States
- Media type: Print (Paperback, Hardcover) & ebook
- Pages: 364 pp
- ISBN: 978-1-59813-161-1

Gun Control in the Third Reich is a non-fiction book by lawyer Stephen Halbrook. It describes the gun control policies used in Germany from the 1918 Weimar Republic through Nazi Germany in 1938. The book aims to explore the role of firearms laws, and in particular those pertaining to civilian ownership of small arms, as they relate to the prevention—or enablement—of mass atrocities such as the Holocaust. The book references German archives, diaries, and newspapers that attest to restrictions on firearm ownership for Jews and enemies of the state. It is published by the Independent Institute.

In an interview in Pittsburgh, Pennsylvania, Halbrook said that he decided to research the topic because "Nobody has ever researched it. I first heard about it when I was an undergraduate in college in 1968, and there were these gun registration bills proposed in Congress. [...] The proponents of the bill challenged that and said they actually had commissioned a Library of Congress study saying there was no use of gun registration lists by the Nazis, either in Germany or in occupied countries, which was blatantly stupid. When (the Nazis) took power in 1933, they immediately used the (gun registration) records to disarm political enemies."

In a November 2013 review of the book in The New Republic, senior editor Alec MacGillis said Halbrook told him that he wanted the book to be seen as a scholarly work. As for analogies between Nazi gun laws and today's gun control debates, Halbrook said: "The Nazis thought it was really important to disarm political enemies and Jews, but as far as contemporary comparisons, I’m very aware of how loosely people use these comparisons, and it does a disservice to the victims of the Holocaust."

== Critical reception ==
A Washington Times review said, "It is the most extensive history to date of Nazi Germany's policies on firearms, drawing largely on original documents."

The New Republic wrote, "...the book's marketers, who are not shy at all about framing the Nazi's disarming of Jews and other political enemies as a giant, .950 caliber warning shot amid efforts in Washington and some states to pass new regulations on firearms."

== See also ==
- Disarmament of the German Jews
- Gun control in Germany
