= National Firearms Association =

Canadian non for profit

National Firearms Association (NFA)
- Formation: 1978
- Headquarters: Edmonton, Alberta, Canada
- Official language: English, French
- Leader: Rick Igercich (President)
- Key people: Blair Hagen Donald Feltham
- Website: www.NFA.ca

The National Firearms Association (NFA; French: Association Nationale des Armes à Feu) is a Canadian non-profit association based in Edmonton. Its main goals are the repeal and replacement of the Firearms Act (Bill C-68), which was introduced into Canadian Parliament in 1995 (Now called "Chapter 39 of the 1995 Statutes of Canada"), the promotion of marksmanship and firearm safety and the protection of the right to hunt, and self-defence and property rights.

The NFA is a registered United Nations non-governmental organization (NGO) with special consultative status to the United Nations Economic and Social Council (ECOSOC). It publishes Canadian Firearms Journal, ISSN 1702-1197.

== History ==
The NFA was formed in 1978.

The NFA was faced with a hostile takeover attempt in 2015. Several lawsuits ensued, with the NFA's incumbent leadership succeeding in retaining power at their Annual General Meeting.

=== Controversy ===
The NFA was criticized for its media release after the occurrence of a shooting spree that left three RCMP officers dead and two others wounded in Moncton, New Brunswick of June 5, 2014. Their statement read, "Incidents like these demonstrate...that none of Canada's firearms control efforts over the past 50 years have had any effect on preventing violence, or otherwise stopping bad people from carrying out their evil deeds... The excessive rules in place do not in any way increase public safety, but merely contribute to an expensive and unnecessary regime which harms only those of lawful intent." The release was perceived by some to be insensitive and politically motivated. The NFA stood by their statement claiming that they were responding to the calls for tighter gun control that people on social media and in government were making.

In late March 2015 the NFA pulled out of a committee looking at the Canadian government's proposed anti-terrorism legislation Bill C-51.

== See also ==
- International Association for the Protection of Civilian Arms Rights
