= Forum Waffenrecht =

Forum Waffenrecht is a political organization in Germany advocating gun ownership rights. The organization advocates for the rights of law-abiding gun owners while working to reduce gun crime.

In a presentation to the United Nations Conference on the Illicit Trade in Small Arms and Light Weapons in All Its Aspects, its representative supported marking and tracing firearms to reduce illegal arms trafficking while noting that even in Germany, with more than 20 million illegal firearms, there is very little crime committed with firearms.
