= PROARMAS =

Private civil association

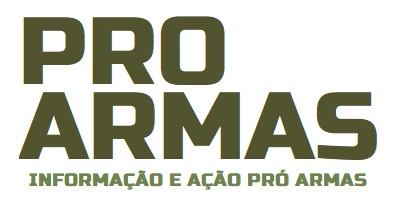
- Founded: June 23, 2020; 6 years ago
- Type: Non-governmental, nonprofit organization
- Purpose: To preserve, protect, and defend the armed self defense rights
- Headquarters: Campo Grande, Mato Grosso do Sul, Brazil
- Founder: Marcos Zborowski Pollon
- Vice President: André Bedin Pirajá
- Website: www.proarmasbrasil.com.br

PROARMAS, officially Associação Nacional Movimento Pro Armas (AMPA) is a private voluntary association, non-profit or political and nationwide, with headquarters in the municipality of Campo Grande, State of Mato Grosso do Sul, Brazil, whose main purpose is the promotion of actions aimed at ensuring the right to self-defense.

== History ==
PROARMAS was conceived by lawyer Marcos Zborowski Pollon, as a way of defending the constitutional principles of the right to life and self-defense through the right to keep and bear arms.

== Actions ==
PROARMAS undertakes actions to disseminate and clarify the population in general and the official bodies involved with public security regarding the right to life and legitimate defense through the publication of clarification pamphlets, face-to-face visits to security and law agencies (FPB, FHP, EB, OAB) and shooting sports clubs in each of the Brazilian States.

PROARMAS also acts at the judicial level, for example, entering as amicus curiae in the "Direct Action of unconstitutionality 6,675" against the decrees published by President Jair Bolsonaro that aim to reduce the bureaucracy of procedures for the acquisition, registration, possession and carry of firearms, accessories and ammunition for those citizens duly qualified under current legislation in Brazil.

== Manifestation ==
PROARMAS has stablished July 9th (referring to the Constitutionalist Revolution) as a manifestation day to get together in Brasília all citizens supporting the right to keep and bear arms; about 10,000 protesters gathered in the first edition in 2020.

=== First edition 2020 ===
Around 10,000 protesters (5,500 according to PROARMAS itself) gathered in the first edition of the event. Protesters called the act "Walking for Freedom".

=== Second edition 2021 ===
The claim about the possibility of a "Brazilian Second Amendment" was registered by some media outlets; in the 2021 edition, organizers estimate that around 20,000 people participated. The demonstration took place along the same lines as the previous year without any incident.

=== Third edition 2022 ===
In the 2022 edition, organizers estimate that between 35,000 and 40,000 people participated. The demonstration, like the previous ones, took place along the same lines and without any incident.

=== Fourth edition 2023 ===
In the 2023 edition, the organizers estimate that the number of participants will be similar to that of the first edition (5,500 according to PROARMAS itself). The demonstration, like the previous ones, took place along the same lines and without any incident.

== See also ==
- Viva Brazil Movement
- Gun Owners of America
- National Rifle Association of America
- National Association for Gun Rights (USA)
- Jews for the Preservation of Firearms Ownership
- Overview of gun laws by nation
