= Stephen Halbrook =

American lawyer and author

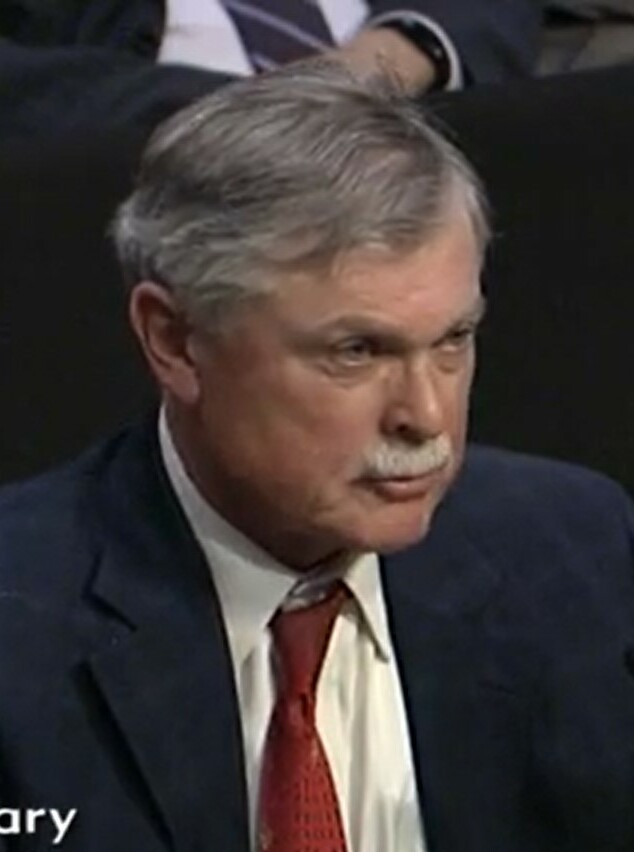
- Halbrook in 2017
- Born: September 12, 1947 (age 78)
- Education: Florida State University (BS, PhD); Georgetown University Law Center (JD)

Stephen P. Halbrook (born 12 September 1947) is a senior fellow at the Independent Institute and an author and lawyer known for his litigation on cases involving laws pertaining to firearms. He has written extensively about the original meanings of the Second Amendment and the Fourteenth Amendment (the latter as applied to Second Amendment rights). He has argued and won three cases before the US Supreme Court: Printz v. United States, United States v. Thompson-Center Arms Company, and Castillo v. United States. He has also written briefs in many other cases, including the Supreme Court cases Small v. United States (pertaining to the Gun Control Act of 1968) and McDonald v. Chicago. In District of Columbia v. Heller, he wrote a brief on behalf of the majority of both houses of Congress. He has written many books and articles on the topic of gun control, some of which have been cited in Supreme Court opinions (Heller, McDonald, Printz v. United States). He has testified before Congress on multiple occasions. Halbrook's most popular book is That Every Man Be Armed, originally published in 1984. The book is an analysis of the legal history and original intent of the Second Amendment.

== Education ==
Halbrook attended Florida State University, receiving a B.S. Business in 1969 and a PhD in philosophy in 1972. He then attended Georgetown University, receiving his J.D. in 1978. He began as an instructor of philosophy at Florida State University, 1970–1972. After completing his PhD he worked as an assistant professor of philosophy at the Tuskegee Institute (1972–1974), Howard University (1974–1979), and George Mason University (1980–1981). While in law school at Georgetown he acted as a Law Fellow of Georgetown's Barristers' Council from 1975 to 1977.

== Career ==
Since 1978 he has been an attorney specializing in civil litigation and criminal defense. He claims to have come to the issue without a particularly abiding interest in guns, or even as a conservative. He has published several books and dozens of articles on the history of the right to bear arms, the historical background of the Second Amendment, modern gun control, Nazi gun control policies during World War II, and Switzerland's policy of armed neutrality during World War II. Halbrook received the David & Goliath Award from Jews for the Preservation of Firearms Ownership (2014). Halbrook first appeared on the Second Amendment scene with a 1981 article in the George Mason University Law Review, arguing that the Second Amendment guarantees an individual right to arms, and that the Fourteenth Amendment was intended to make that Second Amendment guarantee enforceable against the states. He has argued that the Second Amendment, properly understood, protects both the states' right to maintain a militia and an individual right to bear arms for self-defense.

== Books/Articles ==
- Gun Control in Nazi-Occupied France: Tyranny and Resistance Oakland: Independent Institute, 2018. Print.
- Gun Control in the Third Reich: Disarming the Jews and "Enemies of the State" Oakland: Independent Institute, 2014. Print. This book has been translated into Persian by Soleyman Abdi. To access the digital edition of the book, please visit the link below.https://taaghche.com/book/302974
- Why Can't We Be Like France? How the Right to Bear Arms Got Left Out of the Declaration of Rights and How Gun Registration was Decreed Just In Time For the Nazi Occupation, 39 Fordham Urb. L.J. 1637, 2012.
- Firearms Law Deskbook: Federal and State Criminal Practice. St. Paul, MN: Thomson/West, 2006. Previous editions with annual supplements by Clark Boardman Callaghan/Thomson/West Group, 1995–2005.
- The Constitutional Right to Hunt: New Recognition of an Old Liberty in Virginia, 19 Wm. & Mary Bill Rts. J. 197, 2010.
- Heller, the Second Amendment, and Reconstruction: Protecting All Freedmen or Only Militiamen, 50 Santa Clara L. Rev. 1073, 2010.
- Target Switzerland: Swiss Armed Neutrality in World War II. Rockville Center, N.Y.: Sarpedon Publishers, 1998 (hardback); Cambridge, MA: Da Capo Press, 2003 (paperback).
- Target Switzerland has been translated into four languages, and won two international awards.
- The Founders' Second Amendment: Origins of the Right to Bear Arms. Chicago: Ivan R. Dee for the Independent Institute, 2008.
- Arms in the Hands of Jews are a Danger to Public Safety: Nazism, Firearm Registration, and the Night of the Broken Glass. ExpressO, 2008.
- The Swiss and the Nazis: How the Alpine Republic Survived in the Shadow of the Third Reich. Havertown, Pa.: Casemate Publishers; Gloucestershire, UK: Spellmount Ltd., 2006.
- St. George Tucker's Second Amendment: Deconstructing "The True Palladium of Liberty", Tennessee Journal of Law & Policy: Vol. 3: Iss. 2, Article 3. 2006.
- Freedmen, the Fourteenth Amendment, and the Right to Bear Arms, 1866–1876. Westport, Conn.: Praeger Publishers, 1998. Updated edition published as Securing Civil Rights (Independent Institute 2010).
- That Every Man Be Armed: The Evolution of a Constitutional Right. Albuquerque: University of New Mexico Press, 1984. Reprinted in 1994, 2000 by Independent Institute, Oakland, Ca.
- The Right of the People or the Power of the State: Bearing Arms, Arming Militias, and the Second Amendment, 26 Val. U. L. Rev. 131. 1991.
- A Right to Bear Arms: State and Federal Bills of Rights and Constitutional Guarantees. Westport, Conn.: Greenwood Press, 1989.
- What the Framers Intended: A Linguistic Analysis of the Right to "Bear Arms", 49 Law and Contemporary Problems 151–162, 1986.

== See also ==
- Don Kates
- Gary Kleck
- John Lott
- Rudolph Rummel
