= Gun law in the Philippines =

Gun law in the Philippines is regulated by the Firearms and Explosives Office of the Philippine National Police. In order to possess a firearm in the Philippines, a person must be at a minimum age of 21 years and pass a background check to be issued a License To Own And Possess Firearms (LTOPF). They must also take a firearms training and safety course. Any history of mental illnesses or domestic violence within the individual or the family will cause an applicant to have their request rejected.

The Philippines is one of the least gun restrictive countries in Asia; this is in part as a cultural legacy from the days when the Philippines was an American Commonwealth. However, the Supreme Court of the Philippines ruled in Chavez v. Romulo that, unlike the United States, the right to gun ownership is "a mere statutory privilege, not a constitutional right" and cannot be "classified as fundamental" nor "considered an inalienable or absolute right".

Most laws regarding civilian ownership of firearms in the Philippines concern registration and background checks. There is also focus on disarming various militant groups, such as the Islamic separatist groups in Mindanao and the communist rebel groups such as the New People's Army. The Philippines has also enacted laws as a result of many incidents of armed political violence during elections.

Guns are used for hunting, target shooting, self-protection and security purposes. Filipinos can carry pistols and handguns in public by acquiring a Permit to Carry.

PROGUN is the main gun lobby of the Philippines, which is an organization meant to protect Filipino gun rights as well as to endorse politicians who will do so.

According to a 2014 study, there are 1,700,000 licensed firearms owners and 3,900,000 privately owned guns (legally and illegally) in the country.

== History of firearm laws in the Philippines ==
Under the American colonial government, citizens were permitted to possess firearms limited for use as personal protection, for use in hunting, or other lawful purposes only.

During the Marcos Sr. administration, each citizen was only permitted to carry 1 low-powered rifle or shotgun, and 1 pistol or revolver. Officers and enlisted personnel were only permitted to carry 1 low-powered rifle or shotgun, and 1 sidearm. Any excess ownership of guns were to be deposited to the Philippine Constabulary.

During the Estrada administration, an executive order was passed that allowed citizens to possess firearms of any type or caliber, with certain exceptions.

During the 2010 election season, on January 10, a ban was implemented which completely prohibited citizens from carrying firearms in public, with no exceptions. Off-duty police officers carrying their guns in public were arrested for failure to comply with the law. This gun ban was a measure to prevent political killings, as the Philippines often deals with armed conflict during elections such as the Maguindanao massacre. This move saw opposition from the gun lobby, especially from members of PROGUN.

On May 29, 2014, President Benigno Aquino III signed Republic Act 10591, requiring gunsmiths to have licenses to repair registered firearms. The law also required gun owners to renew their licenses every two years, and registration of their guns every four years. Failure to comply will result in revocation as well as confiscation of guns. This new law also required people who wish to carry their firearms outside of their residence to apply for a Permit to Carry, under good reason; these permits are often given to high-profile people.

On May 6, 2022, President Rodrigo Duterte signed Republic Act No. 11766, which eased gun application requirements for qualified people in imminent danger due to the nature of their professions; the law also extended the validity of gun registration from two years to five or 10 years, at the option of the licensee.

On March 5, 2024, the Philippine National Police announced that it would allow civilians to possess semi-automatic rifles following an amendment to the implementing rules and regulations of Republic Act 10591. This was further enumerated in a memorandum issued in May 2024, restricting civilians to only one rifle each, with further regulations upon acquisition of more rifles. The Philippines joined countries like the United States and Yemen in which civilians are allowed to own high-powered rifles.

== Current gun ownership law ==
=== Republic Act 10591 ===
Qualifications to carry guns were set forward by Republic Act 10591 (RA 10591) or the Comprehensive Firearms and Ammunition Regulation Act. RA 10591 stipulates that people seeking to carry a gun may apply for a Permit to Carry Firearm Outside Residence (PTCFOR). PTCFORs are granted on a may-issue basis at the discretion of the issuing authority. A qualified person may apply for a PTCFOR if they are under actual threat. The law specifies people who are considered to be in danger due to their profession or activities. These include lawyers or members of the Philippine Bar, certified public accountants, accredited media practitioners, cashiers, bank tellers, priests, ministers, rabbis and imams, physicians, nurses, and engineers. Businessmen who, by nature of their activities are at high risk of being targeted are also allowed to apply for PTC.

Section 10 of RA 10591 also specifies the firearms that may be registered. Only Class A light weapons (firearms not chambered in a caliber exceeding 7.62mm or capable of fully automatic fire) are allowed to be registered by licensed citizens or juridical entities for ownership, possession, and concealed carrying.

The act also provides for the procurement of arms for use by law enforcement and military personnel. It states that a class B light weapon shall only be possessed by the Armed Forces of the Philippines, the Philippine National Police (PNP) and other authorized law enforcement agencies.

=== Licensing and registration ===
RA 10591 lays out the licensing and registration requirements for firearms.

First and foremost, all firearms must be registered with the PNP. Firearms for use in sports and competitions also require licensing. Firearm and ammunition manufacturers must also apply for licenses. Gun stores are also required to have a license based on the new law for the purchase and sale of guns, as well as general business in handling firearms and ammunition. Gunsmiths must also apply for a license before they may repair registered firearms.

Current laws require gun owners to renew their licenses every two years on or before the date of expiration. If they fail to renew their licenses, it will be automatically revoked, resulting in the lawful confiscation of the firearm by the PNP.

The registration of the firearm must also be renewed every four years, else the license will be revoked and the firearm will be confiscated. Failure to renew the license or registration twice will result in the person being permanently barred from applying for another firearm license.

Renewal applications of the license or registration may be submitted to the Firearms and Explosives Office (FEO) of the PNP within six months before the license or firearm's expiration.
