= Emily J. Miller =

American journalist

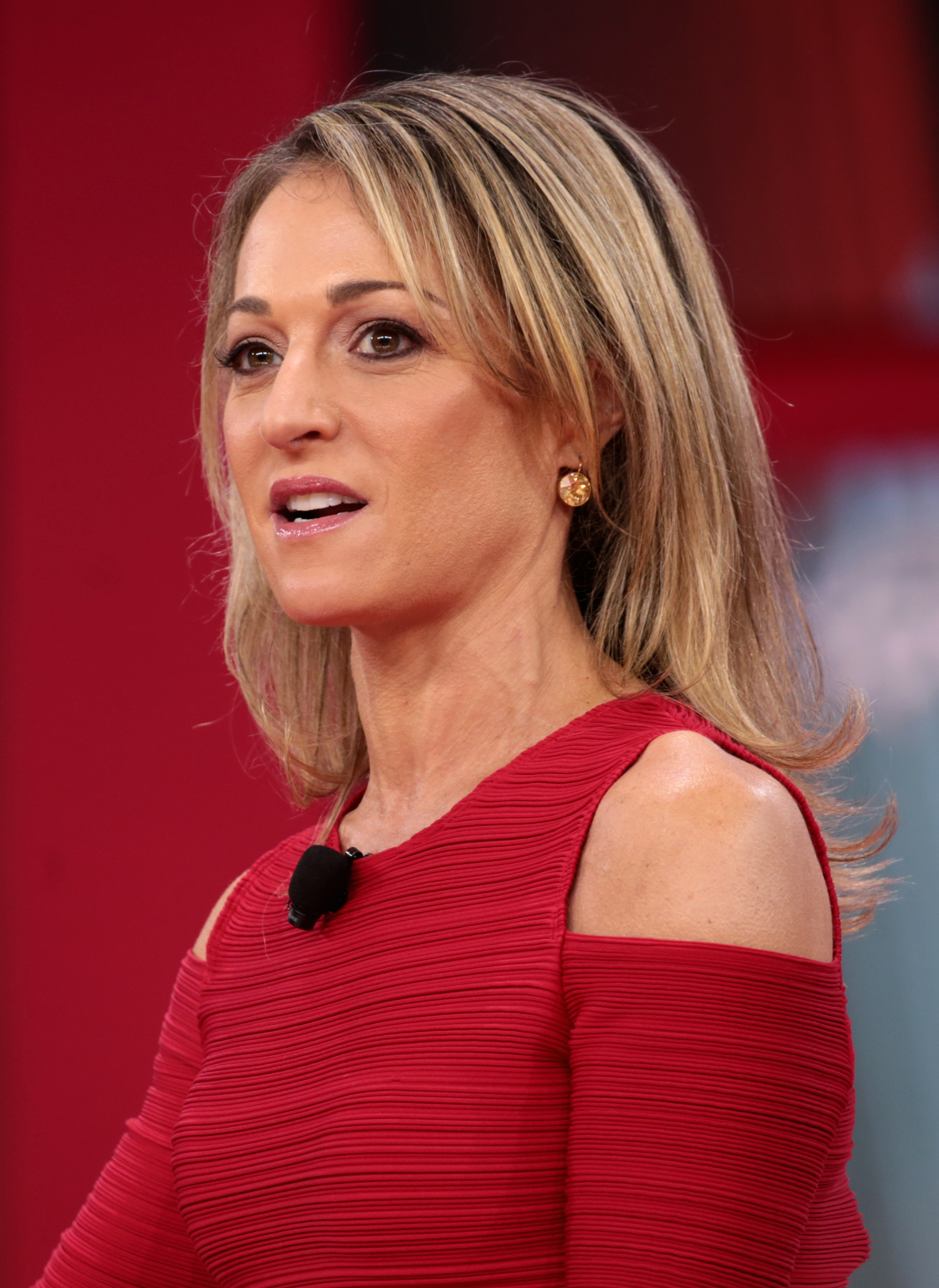
- Emily Miller at CPAC in February 2018
- Born: 1970 or 1971 (age 54–55)
- Education: Georgetown University
- Occupations: Author, political communications strategist; former journalist, government spokesperson
- Notable work: Emily Gets Her Gun: But Obama Wants to Take Yours

Emily Miller (born 1970 or 1971) is an American political communications strategist, journalist and author. She has worked as the senior political correspondent at One America News Network, and before that as chief investigative reporter for WTTG, the local Fox affiliate in Washington, D.C., and was senior editor of The Washington Times' opinion pages. She also worked as deputy press secretary for Secretaries of State Colin Powell and Condoleezza Rice, and as communications director for House Majority Whip Tom DeLay. In 2012, she was awarded the Clark Mollenhoff Award for Investigative Reporting from the conservative Institute on Political Journalism for her column series "Emily Gets Her Gun".

In August 2020, she was the Assistant Commissioner for Media Affairs at the U.S. Food and Drug Administration until she was dismissed from her position after only 11 days.

== Education ==
Miller graduated from Georgetown University.

== Career ==
=== Deputy press secretary at Department of State ===
Miller served as the deputy press secretary at the U.S. Department of State for Secretaries of State Colin Powell and Condoleezza Rice. Before this, Miller worked as communications director for House Majority Whip Tom DeLay.

In 2004, while working as deputy press secretary for Colin Powell, Miller was criticized when she attempted to abruptly end an interview he was giving to Meet the Press. She instructed the cameraman to stop filming Powell, although Powell finished the interview after instructing Miller to allow him to continue. A spokesman for the State Department later defended Miller, saying that she had ended the interview because it had run long despite her "[making] every attempt to get NBC to finish up".

=== Editor, columnist and reporter ===
Miller worked at ABC News as an associate producer for the television shows This Week and Good Morning America. She then went on to become a senior editor for Human Events and a gossip columnist for Politics Daily. After this, she worked at The Washington Times as a columnist and senior editor of their opinion pages, where she wrote opinion pieces with titles such as "Maryland's bathroom bill benefits few transgenders, puts all girls at risk from pedophiles" and "New Obamacare ads make young women look like sluts".

In April 2014, WTTG, a Fox affiliate in Washington, D.C., announced their hiring of Miller as their chief investigative reporter. In June 2016, she moved to One America News Network as their senior political correspondent.

==== Home invasion ====
Miller has described herself as a victim of a home invasion several times, including in a speech at a gun lobbyist event and in a reenactment produced by NRA All Access.

In 2012, Miller was awarded the Clark Mollenhoff Award for Investigative Reporting by the conservative Institute on Political Journalism for her "Emily Gets Her Gun" column series in The Washington Times, in which she describes her attempt to legally acquire and register a handgun in Washington, D.C. after experiencing a home invasion. She recounted the home invasion as an outdoors encounter with a burglar who was leaving the home as she returned.

In 2013, Miller was awarded the David & Goliath Award by Jews for the Preservation of Firearms Ownership. In the same year, Miller published a book titled Emily Gets Her Gun: But Obama Wants to Take Yours, based on her Washington Times column.

In 2015, Erik Wemple of The Washington Post published several articles criticizing Miller for her inconsistent retellings of the incident, and highlighting discrepancies between her descriptions and police reports. Wemple accused her of exaggerating the story to advance her career as a gun lobbyist, saying, "Nothing animates lobbying pushes quite like the story of a criminal invading the home of a law-abiding citizen."

=== FDA appointment and subsequent career ===
In August 2020, Miller, who had no previous science or medical experience, was appointed as Assistant Commissioner for Media Affairs for the Food and Drug Administration (FDA), including being their top spokesperson, a role usually performed by non-political civil servants. Two weeks later, she was abruptly dismissed from the position, reportedly due to repeated clashes with the Agency's staff and a lack of aptitude for communicating in the medical and scientific field. Miller was subsequently appointed as the senior advisor to the chief of staff at the FDA. She described Regeneron's antibody cocktail, which was provided to then-President Donald Trump after he tested positive for COVID-19, as being "like a cure" for the disease.

In June 2021, Miller guest hosted The Hill's daily news program Rising.

== Role in Jack Abramoff lobbying scandal ==
Miller received news coverage in 2006 for her participation in the Jack Abramoff Indian lobbying scandal after cooperating with FBI prosecutors who asked her about illegal activities committed by her ex-fiancé Michael Scanlon. Scanlon subsequently assisted with the investigation of Jack Abramoff, who was his former business partner. Miller was originally considered the first whistleblower in the scandal, although it later became clear that it was Tom Rodgers who exposed the fraud.

Miller and some others have criticized the media for portraying her as a jilted ex-fiancée who decided to expose Scanlon as revenge when he called off their engagement. In a 2009 interview with Howard Kurtz, Miller said that this portrayal was inaccurate, and described her difficulty escaping it. She also discussed contacting director George Hickenlooper and actor Kevin Spacey to try to be removed from the film Casino Jack, a 2010 comedy based on the Abramoff scandal in which she is portrayed by Rachelle Lefevre. She criticized the film for portraying her as "a bitch,... materialistic,... bad in bed,... [and] abetting a federal crime".
