= Independent Institute =

Libertarian think tank based in California

Coordinates: 37.7319°N 122.2050°W

- Logo of the Independent Institute since 2015
- Motto: The Power of Independent Thinking
- Founder: David J. Theroux
- Established: 1986; 40 years ago
- Focus: Public policy
- President: Graham Walker
- CEO: Mary L. G. Theroux
- Faculty: 10
- Adjunct faculty: 249
- Staff: 25 (2024)
- Budget: Revenue: $6.51 million Expenses: $6.6 million (FYE June 2025)
- Address: 100 Swan Way, Oakland, California, 94621-1428
- Website: Independent.org

The Independent Institute is an American libertarian think tank founded in 1986 by David J. Theroux and based in Oakland, California. The institute has more than 140 research fellows and is organized into seven centers addressing a range of political, social, economic, legal, environmental, and foreign policy issues. The Independent Institute publishes books, reports, blogs, podcasts, and the quarterly scholarly journal The Independent Review.

== History ==
The think tank was originally established in San Francisco, was re-located in 1989 to Oakland, and since 2006 has had an office in Washington, D.C. According to the 2020 Global Go To Think Tank Index Report (Think Tanks and Civil Societies Program, University of Pennsylvania), the institute is ranked number 42 (of 110) in the "Top Think Tanks in the United States".

== Publications and programs ==
Since 1996, the institute has published the quarterly scholarly journal The Independent Review, whose founding editor and editor at large is the economist and historian Robert Higgs, and co-editors are Christopher Coyne, Michael Munger, and Robert Whaples.

The institute conducts various conference programs. The institute's Independent Policy Forum has included seminars by individuals including James M. Buchanan and Gore Vidal.

Its program in criminal justice sponsored a series of televised debates on PBS-TV, Stopping Violent Crime: New Directions for Reduction and Prevention, moderated by Harvard law professor Arthur R. Miller, former U.S. Attorney General Richard Thornburgh, federal judge David Sentelle, civil libertarian writer Wendy Kaminer, and others.

In 2006, the institute opened an office in Washington and expanded its media program, including a weekly column by Senior Fellow Álvaro Vargas Llosa in the Washington Post. In 2006 the institute released an Open Letter on Immigration.

== Policy areas ==
The institute's stated mission is "to boldly advance peaceful, prosperous, and free societies, grounded in a commitment to human worth and dignity."

The institute maintains MyGovCost.org, which focuses on the critical analysis of fiscal policy and government waste. It includes a calculator described as enabling Americans to estimate their lifetime federal tax liability and the hypothetical alternative investment return.

Independent Institute scholars have criticized the Patient Protection and Affordable Care Act on economic, legal, ethical, and privacy grounds.

Independent Institute scholars have leveled several criticisms of Medicare. Senior Fellow John R. Graham has lamented the widespread indifference to the Medicare Trustees report's warnings of Medicare's mounting fiscal problems. He has, however, defended Medicare Advantage for giving seniors more choices than traditional Medicare. John C. Goodman has argued that healthcare inflation in the United States began with the creation of Medicare. To help curb Medicare spending, Graham has proposed incentivizing enrollees to seek less expensive medical treatment abroad. Craig Eyermann has also proposed giving Medicare enrollees a direct economic stake in lowering the costs. Goodman has called for the privatization of Medicare.

The Independent Institute has criticized the U.S. Food and Drug Administration, for what it sees as over-regulation as a result of political and bureaucratic incentives. Independent's website FDAReview.org cites numerous scholarly studies by academic economists that question the agency's safety, effectiveness, and incentives. Senior Fellow Robert Higgs has argued that the FDA's regulation of healthcare products is "hazardous to our health".

Senior Fellow Alexander Tabarrok has questioned the need for the FDA's pre-approval requirements for pharmaceuticals on the grounds that doctors successfully prescribe many drugs for off-label usage.

=== Civil liberties and human rights ===
Independent Institute fellows have written on a variety of topics related to civil liberties and human rights. Historian Jonathan Bean anthologized and annotated numerous historical speeches, letters, and articles that show individualist perspectives that animated the American civil-rights era in his book Race and Liberty in America: The Essential Reader. Since 2012, Bean has served on the Illinois State Advisory Committee, a federally appointed panel that advises the U.S. Commission on Civil Rights, and his experience led him to claim that the mainstream civil rights community was out of touch with the public's civil rights concerns.

Second Amendment legal scholar Stephen Halbrook, who has won three firearms cases before the U.S. Supreme Court, has argued in several Independent Institute books and articles that civil liberties are more secure when individuals have legal access to firearms. His 2003 book, The Founders' Second Amendment, traced the U.S. Constitution's guarantees of "the right of the people to keep and bear Arms" back to the American colonists' fears of British oppression. His 2013 book, Gun Control in the Third Reich, examined firearm registration and restrictions in pre-World War II Germany.

Economists Christopher Coyne and Abigail Hall have argued that interventionist militarism can lead to a "boomerang effect," setting in motion political, institutional and ideological forces that contribute to the suppression of civil liberties in the aggressive country.

Independent has also criticized major aspects of the criminal justice system as antagonistic toward civil liberties. Senior Fellow Bruce L. Benson argued in The Enterprise of Law that before the British crown took over the courts, the legal system focused on restitution for victims, rather than punishment, corrections, and deterrence.

In The Power of Habeas Corpus in America, winner of a 2013 PROSE Award in the category of Law and Legal Studies, Research Fellow Anthony Gregory put forth a revisionist view of the writ of habeas corpus, arguing that rather than always promoting the cause of civil liberties, the legal idea has served "both as an engine and a curb on state power."

=== U.S. invasion of Afghanistan ===
In the aftermath of September 11 attacks, the Independent Institute was an early advocate of using privateers, (rather than a military invasion of Afghanistan) to bring the co-conspirators of the terrorist attacks to justice under international law, as authorized in Article I, Section 8, clause 11 of the United States Constitution.

=== Opposition to the Iraq War ===
The Independent Institute promotes a U.S. foreign policy of free trade and non-interventionism, and this perspective was apparent in a host of publications and events it sponsored during the wars in Iraq and Afghanistan since 2001.

Even before the United States led the 2003 airstrikes on Iraq, the Independent Institute's fellows and speakers voiced opposition to a U.S.-Iraq War. That opposition continued for the duration of the conflict. In a Reason magazine symposium marking the 10th anniversary of war's inception, Research Fellow Anthony Gregory called the Iraq war "the worst U.S. government project in my lifetime," and Senior Fellow Robert Higgs said the sizable political and material benefits that accrued to the war's architects demonstrate that "Crime pays."

Senior Fellow Ivan Eland, who directs Independent's Center on Peace and Liberty, wrote extensively on the Iraq war and told an audience at the 2013 CPAC conference that the war helped illustrate why the America's Founders warned against foreign entanglements and were suspicious of standing armies. He has also argued that conservatives who seek a more limited government should celebrate Calvin Coolidge instead of the more interventionist Ronald Reagan.

Eland has argued that the best strategy for minimizing sectarian strife in post-Saddam Iraq is for Iraqis to peacefully partition their country along ethnic and religious lines, a view once also supported by then-Senator Joe Biden and former Ambassador Peter Galbraith.

=== Climate change ===
The Independent Institute has published works by atmospheric physicist and professor emeritus of environmental science Fred Singer, who is an advocate of climate change attribution denial and impact denial. The works include Hot Talk, Cold Science: Climate Change's Unfinished Debate in 1999. It was co-authored with Frederick Seitz, another research fellow of the institute. The book included Singer's 1998 essay, "The Scientific Case against the Global Climate Treaty". The institute also published a 2003 policy report, "New Perspectives in Climate Change: What the EPA Isn't Telling Us", also co-authored by Singer. That report criticized the EPA's 2001 Climate Action Report.

== Funding ==
For the fiscal year ending June 30, 2014, the institute had total revenue of $2,775,869. From 2007 to 2011 the institute took in $12,249,065 from gifts, grants, contributions, and membership fees; and $536,747 in gross income from interest, dividends, payments received on securities loans, rents, royalties, and income from similar sources.

In 1999, the institute sponsored a full-page advertisement in the Washington Post and the New York Times criticizing anti-trust actions against Microsoft and other companies. Later reporting alleged that Microsoft was the institute's biggest donor although the institute disputed this fact, offering contrary data from their own financial records. It was later revealed that Oracle, a competitor of Microsoft, had hired firms to distribute this funding information to media outlets.
