= PROGUN =

Firearms advocacy group

- Abbreviation: PROGUN
- Formation: 1987; 39 years ago
- Type: Shooting sports and gun advocacy
- Website: progun.ph

PROGUN is a firearms advocacy group based in the Philippines. The organization's name stands for "Peaceful Responsible Owners of Guns". It was founded in 1987 to make it easier for Filipino citizens to own and carry firearms. Although it started off as a non-political group, it became heavily involved in political lobbying and advocacy after a long period of inactivity during the early 2000s.

== Political lobbying ==
From around 2009, PROGUN involved itself with political campaigns to protect firearms rights for Filipinos. Most notably, these included:

- opposition to the House Bill No. 6776 firearms control bill (filed on October 19, 2009);
- opposition to the Philippine National Police (PNP) Chief Versoza's proposal in 2010 to put in place an extended gun ban throughout the country.

=== 2010 Election Gun Ban Statistics Project ===
As part of its efforts to block the extended gun ban, PROGUN volunteers started a Gun Ban Statistics Project to record violent crimes during the 2010 Philippine Election gun ban. The projects goal was to challenge the official PNP's claims that the ban put in place during the 2010 elections was successful and therefore should be extended permanently.

As of 9 June 2010, the project recorded 429 incidents in which there were 359 injuries and 566 fatalities.

== Organizational structure ==
In line with Philippine law, PROGUN is governed by a board of 15 directors. After the resignation of Chairman Mike Melchor in June 2010, leadership was taken up by President, Atty. JJ D. Mendoza, and Secretary-General, Atty. Ticky Tabujara.

The organization's membership is made up of 15,000 card-carrying members but it also claims to enjoy the support of 1.2 million 'sympathetic' licensed gun owners throughout the Philippines.

=== Relations with other organizations ===
At its inception, PROGUN was funded by the Association of Firearms & Ammunition Dealers of the Philippines, Inc. (AFAD). However, disagreements in approach to lobbying caused the two organizations to drift apart during the 2000s. In 2010, AFAD backed the launch of a new firearms group, The A2S5 Coalition, which was formed to oppose the extension of the 2010 election gun ban.

During the Philippine National Police Gun Summit in June 2010, a previously unknown organization called "Total Pro-Gun Confederation" was selected to speak on behalf of the Philippine Firearms community. Its designated representative, Mr. Christopher Punla, gave a controversial speech which appeared to mock the firearms community. PROGUN later issued a statement denying any connection with the "Total Pro-Gun Confederation", saying that it used the 'PROGUN' registered trademark "without license or authority".

== See also ==
- List of Gun Rights advocacy groups:
  - United States: National Rifle Association of America (NRA)
  - Spain: National Arms Association of Spain (ANARMA)
  - Israel: The Society of Gun Culture Enhancement in Israel
- Gun safety
- Gun violence
- Gun law in the Philippines
