= Aaron S. Zelman =

American gun rights advocate (1946–2010)

Aaron S. Zelman (March 14, 1946 – December 21, 2010) was an American gun rights advocate, author, and founder of Jews for the Preservation of Firearms Ownership.

== Career ==
Zelman was best known as the founder and executive director of Jews for the Preservation of Firearms Ownership (JFPO), which he founded in 1989 in Wisconsin. He was an author and co-author of books and articles about gun rights, on which he took an absolutist stance on the meaning of the Second Amendment to the U.S. Constitution and encouraged Americans to understand, uphold, and defend the Bill of Rights. In addition, he produced and co-produced films on the subject.

== Life ==
Zelman was born March 14, 1946, in Massachusetts, and raised in Tucson, Arizona, by his grandmother. He served in the U.S. Navy as a Corpsman to Marines (Fleet Marine Force Medic, Third Marine Air Wing), working as a psychiatric unit assistant to returning Vietnam War veterans. After different sales jobs, and work as a gun dealer, he ultimately settled in Wisconsin. Zelman was survived by his wife and two sons. Both sons later died from complications of Marfan syndrome.

== Partial bibliography ==
- "Zelman, Aaron; Neuens, Michael L. (1986). Consumer's Guide to Handguns: Tough, unbiased test reports show you which guns are reliable and your best values. Harrisburg, Pennsylvania: Stackpole Books. p. 197. OCLC 12556917."
- "Zelman, Aaron; Simkin, Jay (1992). Gun Control: Gateway to Tyranny. Hartford, Wisconsin: Jews for the Preservation of Firearms Ownership. p. 139. OCLC 29535251."
- "Zelman, Aaron; Smith, L. Neil (1999). The Mitzvah. Hartford, Wisconsin: Jews for the Preservation of Firearms Ownership. p. 245. OCLC 44589381."
- "Zelman, Aaron; Stevens, Richard W. (2001). Death by Gun Control: The Human Cost of Victim Disarmament. Hartford, Wisconsin: Mazel Freedom Press. p. 338. OCLC 49718155."
- "Smith, L. Neil; Zelman, Aaron (2009). Hope. Rockville, Maryland: Phoenix Pick. p. 245. OCLC 265735832."

=== Gran'pa Jack series ===
- "Zelman, Aaron; Stevens, Richard W. (1997). Gran'pa Jack says: It's common sense to use our Bill of Rights. Hartford, Wisconsin: Jews for the Preservation of Firearms Ownership. p. 47. OCLC 778561793."
- "Zelman, Aaron; Stevens, Richard W. (1998). Gran'pa Jack exposes - Gun Control is Racist!: Facts that racists don't want you to know!. Hartford, Wisconsin: Jews for the Preservation of Firearms Ownership. p. 23. OCLC 778562970."
- "Stevens, Richard W.; Zelman, Aaron (1999). Gran'pa Jack exposes how the United Nations is killing your freedoms!. Hartford, Wisconsin: Jews for the Preservation of Firearms Ownership. p. 23. OCLC 53168946."

== See also ==
- Anti-Defamation League
