= Gun law in North Macedonia =

Laws in North Macedonia regarding firearms

View source data.
Number of registered firearms in North Macedonia by year (in thousands)

Gun laws in North Macedonia allow firearm ownership on shall-issue basis for hunters and collectors and may-issue for self-defense purposes. With approximately 30 civilian firearms per 100 people, North Macedonia is the 15th most armed country in the world.

== Regulation ==
In 2005 "Law on Weapons" was passed which remains in force today with some amendments. At the beginning law allowed firearm possession on may-issue basis.

In 2007 amendment was passed which removed police's discretion in granting firearm licenses for hunting purposes by stipulating what conditions must be met in order to get them, however self-defense licenses remained may-issue.

== Types of firearms ==
The law divides firearms into four categories:

- Category A - includes fully automatic firearms which are prohibited for civilian use.
- Categories B and C - includes semi-automatic firearms, pistols, shotguns and rifles which can be purchased for normal licenses. Firearms under Category C can be given out in extenuating circumstances.
- Category D - includes cold, pneumatic and archery weapons which can be obtained without permit, however they must be registered.

Munition can only be bought with a permission given out by the Ministry of Internal Affairs.

== Getting a license ==
To get firearm license in North Macedonia one must be at least 18 years old, able-bodied, healthy, not representing danger to public order, has permanent residency, has technical knowledge of weapons and regulations related to them and has a justified reason for acquiring it. Justified reason especially means:

- Proving that one's life or property are endangered;
- Being active member of hunting or archery association and passing hunting exam;
- Being collector of weapons;
- Court decision allowed inheriting of weapon;
- Weapon has been granted as award by state or during archery competitions.

== Firearm ownership ==
As of 2018 there are 180,000 (or 8.6 per 100 people) registered firearms in North Macedonia. Small Arms Survey estimates that there are 451,000 illegal firearms in North Macedonia.

2002 survey provided breakdown for registered firearms: 70,574 hunting rifles, 48,128 pistols and revolvers and 10,982 hunting carbines

== See also ==
- Overview of gun laws by nation
