= Disarmament of the German Jews =

Part of series of anti Jewish laws preceding the Holocaust

The disarmament of the German Jews started in 1933, initially limited to local areas such as Berlin, where large-scale raids in search for weaponry took place. Starting in 1936, the Gestapo prohibited German police officers from giving firearms licenses to Jews. In November 1938, the Verordnung gegen den Waffenbesitz der Juden prohibited the possession of firearms and bladed weapons by Jews.

== Weimar Republic ==
The legal foundations that the Nazi Party later used to disarm the Jews were already laid during the Weimar Republic. Starting with the Reichsgesetz über Schusswaffen und Munition (Reich law on firearms and ammunition), enacted on 12 April 1928, weapon purchase permits were introduced, only allowing "authorized persons" to purchase and possess firearms. Mandatory registration of weapons was also introduced, enabling the government to access relevant data, such as the type of weapon and the identity of the owner at any given time. Manufacture and sale of weapons were only possible following authorisation in order to ensure that firearms were only issued to "reliable individuals". Starting in 1930, bladed weapons were also regulated and carrying weapons in public required a weapons permit.

== Takeover by the Nazi Party ==
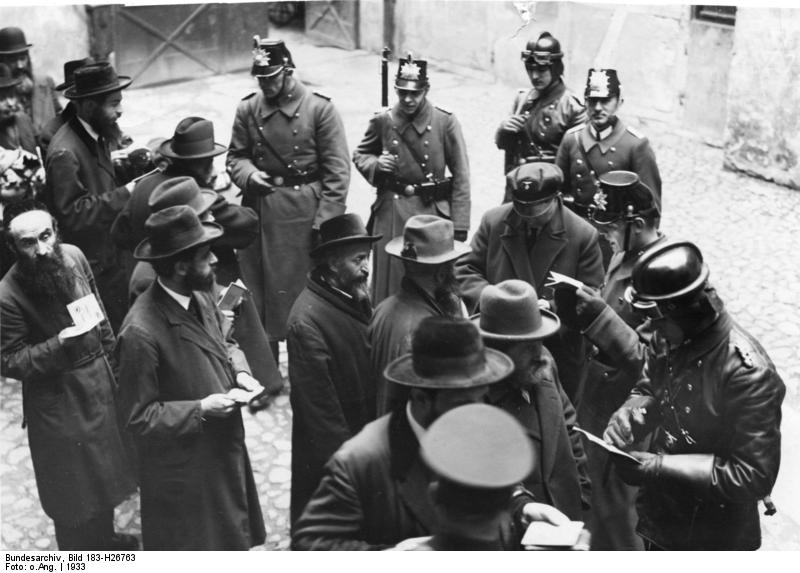
Police raid in the Scheunenviertel (Berlin 1933). Residents of a house on Grenadier-Street are searched for weapons, and have their permits checked.

Immediately following the "Machtergreifung" in 1933, the weapon laws of the Weimar Republic were used to disarm Jews, or to use the excuse of "searching for weapons" as a justification for raids and searches of homes. Because the weapons law of 1928 gave the police the authority to issue or withdraw weapon permits, Jewish weapon owners were disarmed through warrants issued by the police. For instance, the president of the police of Breslau enacted an order on 21 April 1933 which stated that Jews had to give their weapons and shooting permits to the police immediately. After the Jewish population was judged as not to be trusted, no weapon permits were issued to them.

The weapons law was also used for searches of homes and raids. The preface for that was the allegation that the victims of these searches stored large amounts of weapons and ammunition. A prominent example is Albert Einstein, whose summer residence in Caputh, near the Schwielowsee was searched in spring 1933. The only item found there was a bread knife. Raids, for instance on 4 April 1933 at the Scheunenviertel in Berlin, also took place. Not only many weapons were found, but also a lot of publications that included criticism of Nazi Germany. Sometimes, Jews without residence permits were also found and arrested.

Starting in 1935, the Gestapo prevented the issue of weapon permits and weapon purchase permits to Jews. The police authorities were the executing authorities and had to comply with the orders issued by the Gestapo. The self-defense of Jews was abolished, and they were subjected to the arbitrariness and terror of the police authorities, without the need to introduce a new law for this.

== Weapons law and act of 1938 ==
In 1938, the Nazi Party reformed weapons law thoroughly. The Waffengesetz of 18 March 1938 (RGBl. I p. 265) was a relaxation of existing regulations put in place during the Weimar Republic for the vast majority of Germans, especially for members of the NSDAP. The new weapons law also, however, severely restricted or outright prohibited the possession of any weapons to certain groups of people, especially Gypsies, Jews, and also included people convicted due to homosexuality.

Directly after the Kristallnacht, the possession of any weapons by Jews was prohibited through the Verordnung gegen den Waffenbesitz der Juden, enacted on 11 November 1938 (RGBl. I p. 1573).

A contemporary report of the apostolic nuntius of Berlin to Eugenio Pacelli about the Kristallnacht stated: "Also, all weapons were taken from the Jews; and even though the purpose of that was altogether different, it was good, because the ideation of suicide must have been enormous in some."

== Legacy ==
The disarmament of the German Jews is sometimes referenced in the context of gun politics in the United States, where opponents of gun regulation argue that Nazi Germany's restrictions on gun ownership allowed them to cement power, or to implement the Holocaust.

== See also ==
- Jewish resistance in German-occupied Europe
