= Gun law in Uruguay =

Overview article

Uruguayan law allows firearm possession on shall-issue basis. With approximately 35 civilian firearms per 100 people, Uruguay is the eighth most armed country in the world and most armed in Latin America.

== Current law ==
=== Licensing ===
Firearm possession in Uruguay require THATA ("Authorisation for the Acquisition and Possession of Firearms") card. Applicant for THATA must provide:

- Photocopy of an identity card;
- Criminal background check record;
- Medical fitness certificate;
- Salary or financial evidence;
- Certificate of suitability of basic knowledge on safety and handling of firearms (first time applicants only).

Minimum age is 18. According to Decree N° 177/013 authorities may not require any additional conditions that must be met in order to get license except those stipulated by law.

Firearm license must be renewed every three years and licensed owner may own up to eight firearms – police may issue permit for acquisition of more. It is possible to legally own more than eight firearms by registering as a firearms collector, which in practice is a shall-issue permit issued by the National Army which allows its bearer to possess an unlimited number of firearms without restriction of caliber or mechanism, provided those not allowed for normal civilian use are removed from their firing mechanism, which shall be stored in a separate room from the weapon. There is no restriction as to the use of any weapon owned by a collector in private premises.

=== Permitted weapons ===
Civilians are allowed to possess pistols chambered in a caliber up to 9mm with no "extended" magazines allowed (registered competition shooters can still own pistols chambered .40 S&W and .45 ACP) and a maximum capacity of 21 rounds, and revolvers of any calibers not larger than .45. Rifles chambered in .50 BMG or larger are illegal for the civilian population. The only legal semi-automatic rifles are those chambered for rimfire .22 caliber cartridges or smaller, and their maximum magazine size is limited to 10 rounds. Rifles chambered in calibers larger than .22LR have to be of manual action (be it bolt action, lever action or single shot), and the magazine size is limited to 5 rounds. All shotguns must have barrel lengths longer than 400mm. Shotguns are restricted to 8 rounds in the loading tube or magazine, plus one in the chamber, and can be either semi-automatic or manual action (pump action, lever action, bolt action, single shot or double barrel).

Firearms manufactured before the 20th century are not considered firearms according to Uruguayan Law (Decree 377/016, which uses the definition of "firearm" as written in the Inter-American Convention against the Illicit Manufacture of and Trafficking in Firearms, Ammunition, Explosives, and Other Related Materials (commonly known as its Spanish acronym: CIFTA).

With the THATA permit, it is possible to own only up to eight firearms. In order to be legally allowed to own more than eight firearms, one must register as a collector. Once a registered collector, there is no limit to how many firearms one is allowed to collect.

Every registered gun must have undergone a ballistic fingerprinting test in a government facility. Usually gun shops take care of this requirement and only sell guns that have undergone the test, as only 20 tests are conducted in the government facility each week. The reliability of this method has been seriously called into question in countries where it has been implemented for several years. Some of the major criticisms have been that no crimes have been solved thanks to these types of databases, while building and maintaining them usually costs millions of dollars. So far, in Uruguay, no crimes have ever been solved thanks to this method.

=== Permitted ammunition ===
For civilian self-defense use, only FMJ (full metal jacket) ammunition is allowed. The use of FMJ ammunition has been described as extremely irresponsible by many self defense instructors, as those rounds tend to overpenetrate and ricochet, posing an unnecessary threat to innocent bystanders. They argue that this risk could be greatly reduced with the use of JHP (jacketed hollow point) ammunition, which is illegal for civilians to use in Uruguay. The justification for this regulation is that Uruguay is a signatary of the Geneva Convention, which forbids the use of expanding ammunition, such as JHP ammunition, in war, and that it is normal to have this rule applied to civilian use of firearms also, and that the use of expanding ammunition is cruel and unnecessary.

The police forces are allowed to use semi-jacketed soft point bullets in an effort to combat the risk of overpenetration and ricochets against the ground or other barriers, which could endanger unintended targets.

=== Carrying firearms ===
The licensed carry of firearms requires a special carry permit issued by police. The applicant must present a good reason, especially proof of threat for one's life. The carry permit is issued at discretion of police. In practice, concealed carry permits are issued to a few number of civilians, private security guards, judges, and attorneys. The Law allows the carrying of one handgun only in concealed manner. It is illegal to carry guns during public events, demonstrations, public dances, in polling stations, and in bars with alcohol. Every time carrying permit is renewed, the applicant must prove that the previous reason is still valid. Self-defence is not considered a valid reason, but the need to carry large amounts of cash in the street, for example, counts as a valid reason to apply for the permit. Policemen and military are allowed to carry their weapons in a concealed manner while off duty, as well as retired police and military. In recent times, politicians from the governing coalition have expressed their intentions of making the obtaining of concealed carry permits possible for common citizens.

== Firearm possession ==
As of 2018 there are 604,271 (or 18 per 100 people) registered firearms in Uruguay including revolvers (36.65%), rifles (23.5%), pistols (21.18%), shotguns (18.33%) and muskets (0.33%). Small Arms Survey estimates that there are approximately 600,000 illegal guns in Uruguay.

== See also ==
- Overview of gun laws by nation
