= Firearms regulation in Norway =

Gun laws in Norway incorporates the political and regulatory aspects of firearms usage in the country. Citizens are allowed to keep firearms (most commonly for hunting and/or sports shooting). The acquisition and storage of guns is regulated by the state.

== Laws and regulations ==
Firearms in Norway are regulated by the Law on weapons, firearms, weapon parts and ammunition with additional regulations given in the Regulations on weapons, firearms, weapon parts and ammunition. Guns owned and operated by the armed forces and the police are exempt from the aforementioned law. The National Police Directorate can issue government circulars to further detail and define how the firearm laws and regulations should be interpreted by the police.

== Types of firearms owned by civilians ==
Norway has a large population of hunters and sports shooters. Semi-automatic and bolt-action rifles, as well as shotguns, pistols and revolvers make up the better part of the guns in civilian homes. Fully automatic firearms are prohibited for civilian ownership for the most part, that is unless they are a collector and member of the Norwegian historical weapons society who may be issued licenses for automatic firearms.

== General firearms ownership ==
The ownership of firearms is restricted in Norway, firearms licenses are issued by the Norwegian police on a may issue basis. However, in practice almost all applicants are granted firearms licenses (e.g. 98.3% of firearm license application were granted in 2017). As of 2017 there were 1,329,000 registered firearms owned by 486,028 people, which means approximately one in ten people own a registered firearm.

Civilian firearms licenses are mostly granted for the application of hunting and/or sports shooting. However, there are some exceptions such as collectors who are members of the Norwegian historical weapons society, museums, international ship and port facility security and some other specialty purposes not generally applicable to ordinary civilians.

Gun collectors are exempt from many of the restrictions regarding type, function and characteristics of a firearm that most civilian firearms must abide by. However, becoming a gun collector is generally a lot more difficult than becoming a hunter or sports shooter. Gun collectors may own up to 100 firearms, but they must be tied to one or more specific fields of collection - often classified by historical periods, wars or geographical locations. Gun collectors may not fire their firearms without explicit permission from the police.

Rifle and shotgun licenses can be issued to persons 18 years or older with a clean criminal record. The applicant for the licenses must document a need for the weapon, usually hunting or sports shooting. There exists three exceptions to this age qualification. A minor under the age of 18, but over the age of 16 may apply for rifle or shotgun licenses in the name of a consenting parent or legal guardian.

For handguns, the age of ownership is 21. However, minors between the age of 12 to 18 can apply for caliber .22lr pistols licenses in the name of a consenting parent or legal guardian. The aforementioned rules also applies to those between the age of 18 to 21, but for any pistol caliber. Any license granted by the police in the name of a consenting parent or legal guardian on behalf of a minor is only valid for two years at a time.

== Obtaining a firearms license in Norway ==
To legally qualify for a firearms license you must either be a Norwegian citizen, have a permanent residence permit or have been living continuously in Norway for a minimum of five years. Citizens from within the European Economic Area (EEA) are exempt the five year ruling if they can provide a valid Police certificate of conduct from their country of origin.

Hunters can obtain up to a total of eight firearms (for hunting), whilst sport shooters can obtain one firearm for each shooting disciplines approved by the National Police Directorate. Sports shooters who compete internationally and/or has participated in more than 10 competitions for a specific shooting disciplines in the past 12 months can apply for a spare firearm in each approved shooting discipline.

=== For hunting ===
To obtain a hunting license, the applicant must complete a 30-hour, 9-session course and pass a written multiple choice exam. The course includes firearm theory, firearm training, wildlife theory, and environmental protection training.

Once the exam is passed, the applicant may enroll in the hunter registry and receive a hunting license. The membership must be renewed each year, through license payment. The hunting license is brought to the police station, where the applicant fills out an application for obtaining the proper firearm for his or her hunt. After evaluation, part of the application is sent back to the applicant if it was approved. Upon approval, the applicant can take the returned form to the store and purchase the firearm listed in the application.

=== For sports shooters ===
To become a sports shooter in Norway you must enroll in a firearm safety course hosted by a sports shooting club, lasting at least 9 hours. The course includes classroom theory, a written test as well as practical experience on the shooting range. Passing the safety course results in acceptance to the sports shooting club, and a certificate for completion. After getting the firearms safety certificate and becoming a member of a sports shooting club one will most likely start out training or competing with a firearm owned by the sports shooting club.

Sports shooters who compete or participate in a shooting discipline with manual rifles, semi-automatic rifles approved for hunting, manual or semi-automatic shotguns may apply for a license after having participated in six organized training sessions and/or competitions for said shooting sports organizations.

Sports shooters who compete or participate in a shooting discipline with manual or semi-automatic pistols and/or revolvers may apply for a license after having been a member of a sports shooting club for a minimum of six months, and having participated in ten organized training sessions and/or competitions for said shooting sports organizations within the last six months.

Sports shooters who compete or participate in a shooting discipline with semi-automatic rifles not approved for hunting (e.g. AR-15–style rifle) may apply for a license after having been a member of a sports shooting club for a minimum of 24 months, and having participated in ten organized training sessions and ten competitions for said shooting sports organizations within the last 24 months.

The requirements for a high capacity magazine license for semi-automatic pistols requires having been a member of a sports shooting club for a minimum of 12 months, and having participated in ten organized training sessions and/or competitions for said shooting sports organizations within the last 12 months. The license requirements for high capacity magazines for semi-automatic rifles are the same as the license requirements for semi-automatic rifles which are not approved for hunting.

When applying for any sports shooting firearms license you must also be able to document membership in a sports shooting club, as well as membership in said shooting sports organization. You must also document having completed the firearms safety course.

== Transportation & storage of firearms and ammunition ==
Firearm owners must have a good cause for bringing a firearm to a public space. A good cause could include transportation to and from a shooting range, hunting area, transportation for repairs, or for maintenance and hobby activities.

During transportation, the weapon must be empty and concealed, but not worn in any form of holster or otherwise on the body, and the firearm must be under constant supervision of the owner - effectively prohibiting any form of concealed or open-carrying of firearms. This applies equally to replicas, air guns and decommissioned firearms.

The entire firearm or a vital part must be stored in an insurance-rated safe when not in use. For the safe to be approved, it must be certified to FG-520, SSF 3492, EN 1143, NS 5089, INSTA 610 or better.

Gun safes must be located within the permanent residence of the person(s) who legally own(s) the firearm(s) stored within it. It has to be within the livable space of the residence, meaning it cannot be stored in a garage, shed, detached storage unit etc.

The police can perform a home inspection of the safe. An inspection must be announced 48 hours or more in advance, and the police are only allowed to see the safe and make sure it is legally installed.

Within a single household, you may only store up to 10,000 rounds of ammunition, or 15,000 rounds if 5,000 are .22 LR or a smaller calibre. Ammunition must be stored within a lockable container and be physically separated from any firearm (i.e. you may not store your firearms loaded). One can apply for an exception from the storage limit with no official upper limit for exceptions.

== Reloading ammunition ==
Reloading your own ammunition is legal in Norway if you have a firearms license. You may only load ammunition for a caliber you have a firearms license for, or you have a “loan permit” for.

You can legally store up to 5kg of smokeless powder in your home, and up to 10,000 primers. Black powder can also be stored in your home, split into 1kg boxes up to a total of 3kg. Black powder must be stored in the original plastic container it was purchased in, moreover, each 1kg container must be separated by dividing walls in a wooden box/chest. The storage container cannot be kept near an open heat source like a fireplace or oven. One can apply for an exception to store more than 10,000 primers, 5kg smokeless powder and 3kg black powder. With an exception there is no limit on the amount stored.
