= Gun control in Brazil =

As of 2005 in Brazil, all firearms are required to be registered with the minimum age for gun ownership being 25. It is generally illegal to carry a gun outside a residence, and a special permit granting the right to do so may be granted to certain groups, such as law enforcement officers and judges. For citizens to legally own a gun, they must have a gun license, which costs R$1000 (US$185.53) and pay a fee of R$85 (US$15.77) every three years to renew the gun register. The registration can be done online or in person with the Federal Police. Until 2008, unregistered guns could be initially registered at no cost for the gun owner, the subsequent referring fee each decade would then apply. As of the Luiz Inácio Lula da Silva administration a civilian is only allowed to own 2 firearms.

== Facts ==
- In 2023, there were almost 800,000 registered gun owners in Brazil.
- In 2007 it was estimated that 8.3 million people had firearms in Brazil, 9 million of which were unregistered.
- In 2003, 39,000 people died from firearm-related injuries nationwide.
- In 2004, that number decreased to 36,000.
- By 2019, there were 50,000 firearms related deaths in Brazil.
- Brazil has the second largest arms industry in the Southern Hemisphere.
- Approximately 80% of the weapons manufactured in Brazil are exported, mostly to neighboring countries; many of the firearms are then brought back into Brazil.
- Some firearms in Brazil come from police and military arsenals, having either been "stolen or sold by corrupt soldiers and officers."

== History ==
In 2005, a large majority of Brazil's population voted against banning the sale of firearms and ammunition to civilians in a referendum. Executive Order No. 5.123, of 1 July 2004 allowed the Federal Police to confiscate firearms which are not possessed for a valid reason; self-defense was not considered a valid argument.

These measures saw mixed results. Initially, the crime rate dropped, but subsequently rose in later years. 2012 marked the highest rate of homicides in the country, eight years after a ban on carrying handguns in public went into effect, and 2016 saw the even higher homicide rate in Brazil, with 61,619 dead. The rate appeared again in 2017 to 63,880, a 3.7% rise from 2016.

In 2019 by President Jair Bolsonaro's administration, the number of homicides registered was 19% lower compared to 2018 (51,558), while in 2019 the registered number was 41,635 being the lowest number of homicides since 2007. However, according to experts, this drop in the homicide rate was spurred by varying causes—such as individual states' policies, an aging population, and a truce between rival criminal organizations.

=== Jair Bolsonaro policy ===
Former President Jair Bolsonaro was strongly in favor of repealing the disarmament law and allowing citizens to own and carry firearms for defense. On 15 January 2019, Bolsonaro signed the first decree to facilitate the purchase of firearms. The decree increased the valid firearms ownership period from five to ten years and allows citizens to own up to four firearms. In order to own firearms, a citizen will have to provide proof of the "existence of a safe or a secure location for storage" of the weapon at home. Requirements for possession such as passing training courses and background checks remain, as does the minimum age requirement of 25 years. The decree does not affect restrictions carry, only for possession.

On 7 May 2019, Bolsonaro signed an additional decree which allows for rural firearm owners to use their firearms on their own property; allowing additional arms imports into Brazil; allowing collectors, sports shooters, and hunters to travel from their homes to shootings ranges with their firearms and ammunition; entitling stabilized military with ten or more years experience to bear firearms; and increasing the right to purchase cartridges a year from 50 to 5000 and to 1000 for restricted weapons.

== See also ==
- IANSA (NGO)
- Taurus (manufacturer)
