= National Arms Association of Spain =

The National Arms Association of Spain (Spanish: Asociación Nacional del Arma, abbr. ANARMA) is a Spanish non-profit organisation which defends the ownership and recreational use of firearms by law-abiding citizens (and foreign residents) under national legislation. As current legislation is restrictive by nature, most effort is placed on the adaptation of national laws to EU directive, and defending the rights of gun owners by legal means. Since self-defense is not considered as sufficient motive for acquiring a firearm licence (compulsory for all arms and related activities), the principal collectives represented by the association consist of precision and practical shooters, hunters and arms collectors.

== History ==
The National Arms Association was founded in 2003, after a proposed bill had threatened to introduce significant modifications to firearms regulations (firearms are governed by special regulations rather than statutory law). Although the initiative gained a fair share of acceptance at its inception, the fact the bill was never brought to a vote as well as internal conflicts, brought about its near dissolution.

The association’s resurgence took place in 2010, after the presentation of a new bill, introducing important modifications to arms regulations, mobilised the principal affected groups. The association's involvement in the process which led to the dismissal of most of these modifications, as well as its leading role in the withdrawal of another bill, this time on ammunition and pyrotechnic materials, helped it gain popularity among its target audience.

== Objectives ==
According to its constitution act, the Spanish Arms Association has two main objectives: representing the interests of its members and defending their rights, on one hand, and raising awareness among citizenship, as well as the institutions, in regard with the varied facets of firearms-related activities.

The association argues that Spanish authorities disregard their constitutional obligation to boost recreational sport activities, including those related to firearms. Another argument maintains that current legislation, let alone the proposed modifications, fails to meet EU regulations. The association also defends the preservation of national heritage, from made-in-Spain firearms, to related artisan and craftsmen trades such as sword-forging, considered to be nearly extinct.

The Spanish Arms Association is not associated with any political party or umbrella organisation, mostly because, unlike other organisations of its kind, it wouldn’t operate as a lobby. This is made possible by the fact that firearms manufacturers, in spite of many being members of ANARMA, are normally formally represented by other, professional associations, which protect their commercial interests. The association’s funding comes from membership fees and the sale of promotional items.

== Organisational structure ==
President; Javier Arnáiz

Executive Vicepresident and Spokesman; Daniel Alvárez

Secretary and Treasurer; Amaya Taranco

Regional delegates; José Roca, Antonio Lema, Jesús Sanchez, Mario Alberto Moreno, Santiago Lopez, Xavier Fa

Coordinators and delegates to other countries; Marcel Salmans (FESAC)

Other, minor positions;

== International collaboration ==
The Spanish Gun Association is a member of the Foundation for European Societies of Arms Collectors (FESAC by its initials in French), which played a major role in the drawing up of European policy on gun laws.

On April 30, 2012, ANARMA has become a full member of the International Association for the Protection of Civilian Arms Rights.

It has been reported that the NRA was the principal advisor during ANARMA’s restoration at the turn of 2010.

== See also ==
- Right to keep and bear arms
- Gun safety
- International Association for the Protection of Civilian Arms Rights

Similar associations in other countries

- Brazil: Viva Brazil Movement
- Canada: Dominion of Canada Rifle Association
- Philippines: PROGUN
- Switzerland: proTell
- Israel: The Society of Gun Culture Enhancement in Israel
- United States: National Rifle Association of America (NRA)
- United Kingdom: National Rifle Association of the UK
