= Jews for the Preservation of Firearms Ownership =

Jewish American gun rights organization

- Formation: 1989; 37 years ago
- Founder: Aaron S. Zelman
- Tax ID no.: 39-1732344
- Legal status: 501(c)(3) nonprofit organization
- Headquarters: Bellevue, Washington
- Members: 7,000 _{(as of 2011)}
- President, Director: Alan M. Gottlieb
- Revenue: $127,851 (2016)
- Expenses: $79,336 (2016)
- Employees: 0 (2016)
- Volunteers: 12 (2016)
- Website: jpfo.org

Jews for the Preservation of Firearms Ownership (JPFO) is an American 501(c)(3) nonprofit organization dedicated to the preservation of gun rights in the United States and to encourage Americans to understand, uphold, and defend "all of the Bill of Rights for all Citizens." The group was founded by U.S. Navy veteran, former federally licensed gun dealer, and author Aaron S. Zelman in 1989. Jews for the Preservation of Firearms Ownership recognizes the Second Amendment as protecting a pre-existing natural law right of individuals to keep and bear arms. It is based in Bellevue, Washington.

Jews for the Preservation of Firearms Ownership takes the position that an armed citizenry is the population's last line of defense against tyranny by their own government. The organization is noted for producing materials (bumper stickers, posters, billboards, booklets, videos, etc.) with messages that equate gun control with totalitarianism, often through the Nazi gun control argument. The most famous of these are the "All in favor of Gun Control raise your right hand" materials, which features a drawing of Adolf Hitler giving a Nazi salute. The organization also attempts to prove that genocide is linked to gun control, by showing that most countries where a genocide has taken place had gun control first.

Members are not required to be Jewish. The only membership requirement is that you must be a "law-abiding citizen," by "obeying the Bill of Rights."

== History ==
In 2010, JPFO Founder Aaron Zelman issued an open letter to NRA Board of Directors member Ted Nugent, titled "The Day I'll join the NRA."

Zelman died on December 21, 2010, age 64.

The JPFO David & Goliath Award, created in 2011, is given to individuals or groups who advocate for firearms ownership. Recipients include: David Codrea and Mike Vanderboegh, the investigative reporters who broke the Fast and Furious scandal (2011); Emily Miller, the Washington Times columnist who documented Washington, D.C.’s reluctance to obey its own gun laws (2013); Stephen P. Halbrook, Ph.D., the author and attorney who linked Nazi gun confiscations directly to the Holocaust (2014): and Kyle Kashuv, Stoneman Douglas High School mass murder survivor and Second Amendment rights activist (2018).

Jews for the Preservation of Firearms Ownership has been highly critical of the Anti-Defamation League (ADL). In pamphlets such as "Why Does the ADL Support Nazi-Based Laws?" and "JPFO Facts vs. ADL Lies," the JPFO has accused the ADL of undermining the welfare of the Jewish people. In response, Abraham Foxman, National Director of the Anti-Defamation League, wrote about the JPFO, "Anti-Semitism has a long and painful history, and the linkage to gun control is a tactic by Jews for the Preservation of Firearms Ownership to manipulate the fear of anti-Semitism toward their own end... It is a campaign that has been viewed with concern by many in the Jewish community."

In 2016, JPFO launched the "Don't Inspire Evil Initiative", a proposal that urges journalists "to refrain from gratuitous or repetitious portrayal of mass murderers' names and images."

Modeled after the Doomsday Clock, JPFO's "Gun Confiscation Clock" tracks what JPFO sees as the threat to Americans' right to keep and bear arms.

In 2018, JPFO advisory board member Dov Marhoffer, a Holocaust concentration camp survivor, penned an op-ed titled "Never Again" calling attention to what JPFO believes to be an appropriate historical understanding and context of the motto. In the piece, Marhoffer sees alternative usage of the motto promoting gun control as inappropriate.

== Political positions ==
Jews for the Preservation of Firearms Ownership claims that parts of the text of the Gun Control Act of 1968 were translated from Nazi legislation. The German Weapons Law, which existed before the Nazis came to power in 1933, was altered on 18 March 1938 by the Nazi Government. The JPFO's claim is based in part on the fact that the 1968 GCA introduces the "sporting purpose" test to distinguish different types of weapons, similar to the "sporting purpose" test that existed in the German law in question. Senator Thomas Dodd was a prosecutor at the Nuremberg Trials and had reviewed copies of the Nazi Germany firearms laws, and in 1968 requested translations of these from the Library of Congress.

Bernard Harcourt, professor at the University of Chicago Law School, in discussing this fundamental proposition advanced by the JPFO, notes, "[O]n January 13th, 1919, the Reichstag enacted legislation requiring surrender of all guns to the government. This law, as well as the August 7, 1920, Law on the Disarmament of the People passed in light of the Versailles Treaty, remained in effect until 1928, when the German parliament enacted the Law on Firearms and Ammunition (April 12, 1928)—a law which relaxed gun restrictions and put into effect a strict firearm licensing scheme." Harcourt continued, "To be sure, the Nazis were intent on killing Jewish persons and used the gun laws and regulations to further the genocide", but he concluded that the firearms laws were not central to implementing the Holocaust.

Attorney and author Stephen Halbrook, in his law article "Nazi Firearms Law and the Disarming of the German Jews", asserts that German arms laws were extremely lax, and even under the 1920 "Law on the Disarmament of the People", only items such as grenades and machineguns were banned and small arms such as rifles and pistols remained in common use. Valery Polozov, a former advisor to the committee on national security in the Russian Duma, claims in his book "Firearms in Civil Society" that Germany did not in fact have comprehensive gun control legislation up until 1928, which created the legal framework later built upon by the Nazis. Halbrook did clarify in the first sentences of his article that, "Gun control laws are depicted as benign and historically progressive. However, German firearm laws and hysteria created against Jewish firearm owners played a major role in laying the groundwork for the eradication of German Jewry in the Holocaust."

== Activities ==
JPFO publishes for its membership the "Bill of Rights Sentinel," a quarterly newsletter, with a masthead featuring the motto, "All the Bill of Rights for All Citizens."

JPFO's Rabbinic Directors, providing guidance on Judaism and firearms, include Rabbi R. Mermelstein and Rabbi Dovid Bendory.

JPFO founder Aaron Zelman encouraged Americans to celebrate Bill of Rights Day (December 15).
