= Collectors, Shooters and Hunters =

CAC

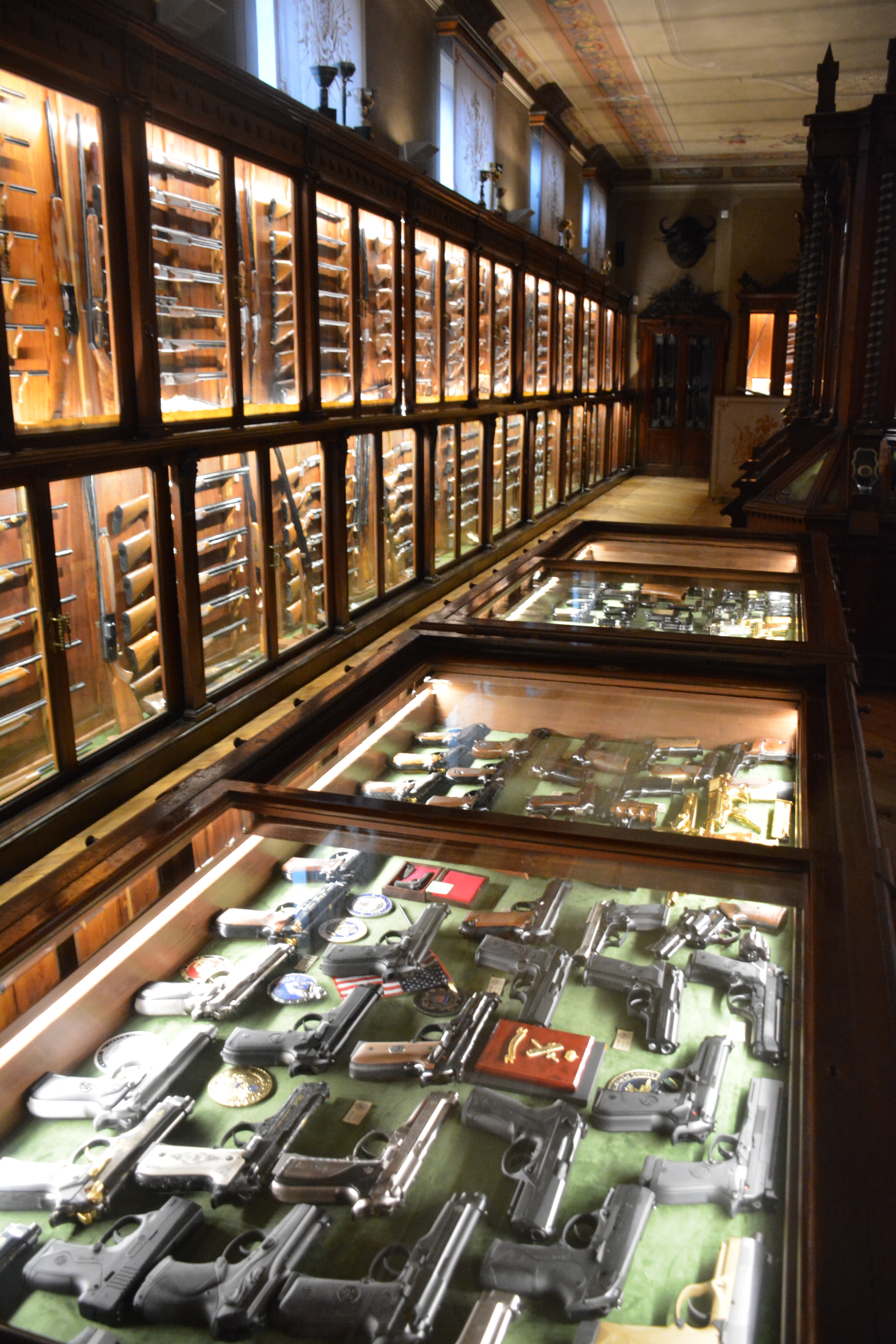
Collector
Colecionador

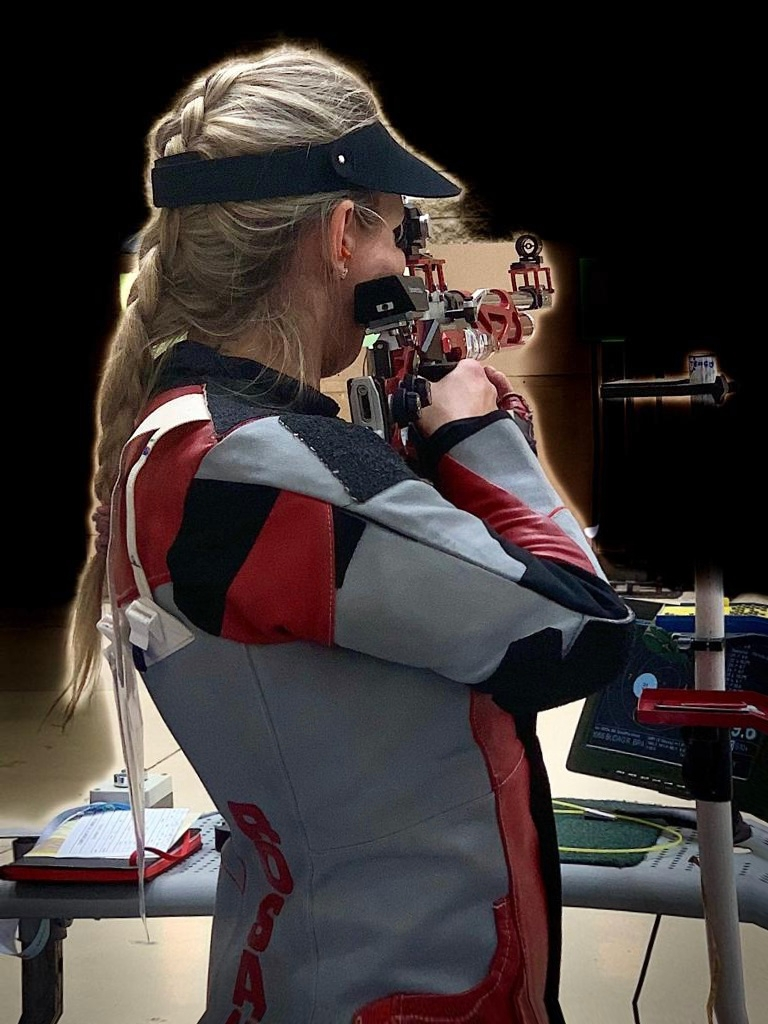
Shooter
Atirador

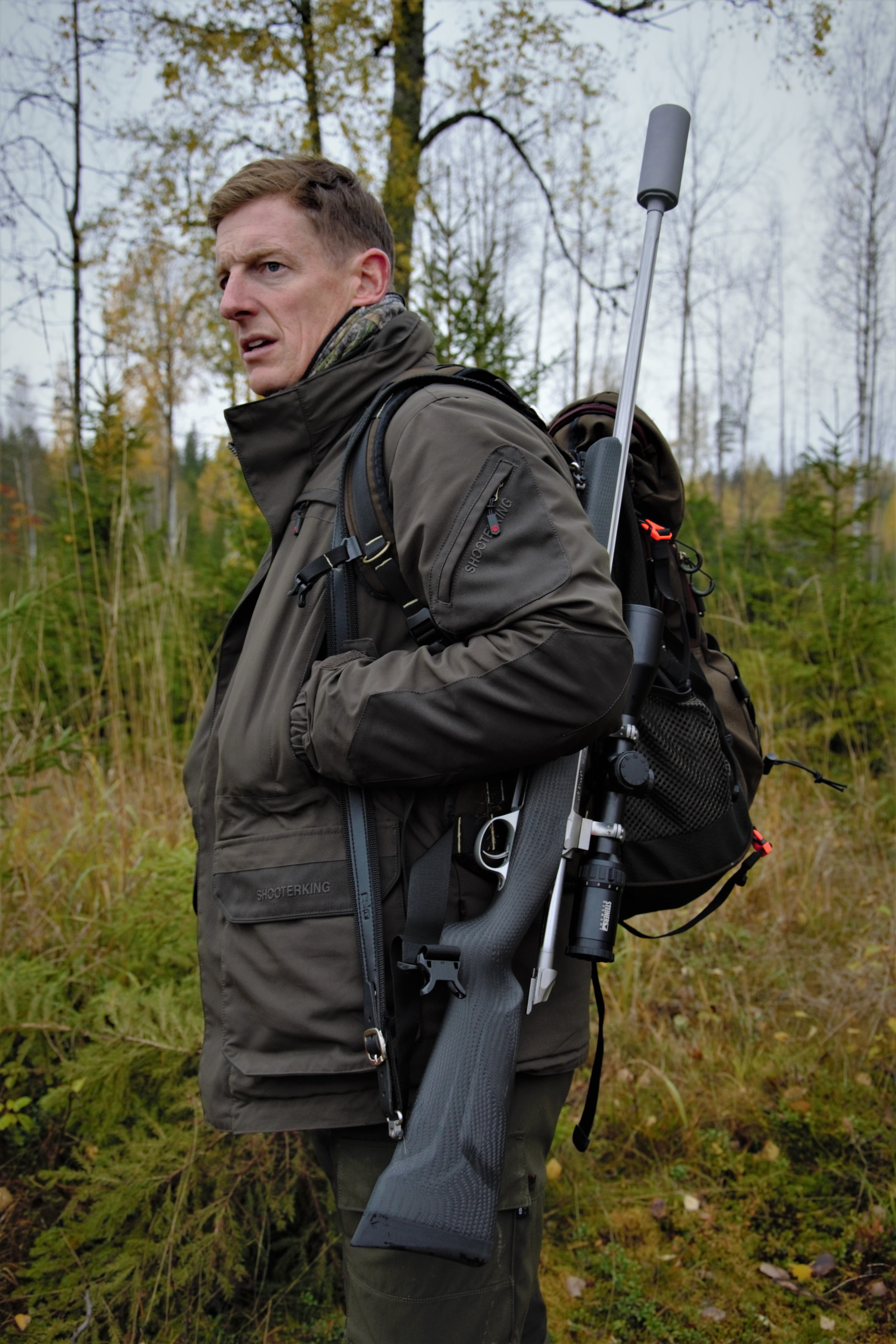
Hunter
Caçador

Collectors, Shooters and Hunters (in Portuguese: "Colecionadores, Atiradores desportivos e Caçadores" - CACs) is the designation given to those citizens have the right under Brazilian law to possess firearms and ammunition for collecting, shooting and hunting activities.

According to data collected from the Army and the Federal Police, in January 2021, there were more than 1 million registered CACs in Brazil.

== CAC in practice ==
According to Ordinance No. 51 (2015) of the Army Logistic Command, in its article 3, "The Registration Certificate (known as "CR") is the supporting document of the administrative act that effectively registers the individual or legal entity in Army to authorize the exercise of activities with PCEs (Products Controlled by the Army)".

The "CR" (Registration Certificate - "Certificado de Registro" in Portuguese) is the document issued by the Army, through SFPC - "Inspection Service for Controlled Products", precisely to prove that the citizen is authorized to perform the Collectors, Shooters and Hunters activity.

The "CR" is governed by the "SIGMA", "Military Weapons Management System". The entire management of registered shooters is carried out by a Military Region ("RM" - "Região Militar" in Portuguese) where the individual or legal entity is domiciled.

One of the requirements for the "CR" Concession is that the shooter must maintain a link with a Shooting or Hunting Club, that is, be regularly up to date with his financial obligations; prove and participate effectively in shooting practice, courses, training and/or competitions.

For the authorization of the "CR", several criteria are required, such as: personal identification, suitability, technical capacity and psychological aptitude, security of the collection (the PCEs), and other complementary information.

The "CR" is granted to people over 18, remembering that for the acquisition of firearms, according to the current Brazilian legislation, it is necessary to be 25 years old. There are exceptions to the concession for minors, with specific processes before the Juvenile Court.
