= Gun control in Germany =

In Germany, access to guns is controlled by the German Weapons Act (German: Waffengesetz), which adheres to the European Firearms Directive and was first enacted in 1972, and superseded by the law of 2003. This federal statute regulates the handling of firearms and ammunition as well as acquisition, storage, commerce and maintenance of firearms.

In a debate on stricter gun control after a school shooting that resulted in 16 deaths, German weapons expert Holger Soschinka asserted that "Germany has one of the strictest weapons laws worldwide - and it is sufficient". However, others criticized it as too lax and argued that more control is needed, with one anti-weapons group describing the law as "unconstitutional" because it "puts the interests of sport shooters above peoples' right to life and physical integrity".

While gun ownership is widespread, and associations and ranges for shooting sports and the use of historical guns and weapons in festivals are not forbidden, the use of guns for private self-defence is restricted.

The German Ministry of the Interior estimated in 2009 that the number of firearms in circulation, legally and illegally, could be up to 45 million. Germany's National Gun Registry, introduced at the end of 2012, counted 5.5 million firearms in use, which are legally owned by 1.4 million people in the country. About 1.5 million sport shooters in several thousand Schützenvereinen ("shooting associations") own and use guns for sport, about 400,000 hunters have a licensed gun, about 300,000 collect guns and about 900,000 own an inherited gun.

== History of firearms restrictions in Germany ==
The Ewige Landfriede (Perpetual Public Peace) ruling of 1495 banned the medieval right of vendetta (Fehderecht) in the Holy Roman Empire (which encompassed most of what is modern Germany). It passed at the Diet of Worms and was enacted by the German king and emperor Maximilian I. In the Holy Roman Empire claims were henceforth no longer to be decided in battle, but through legal process. It established a certain monopoly of the state in the use of organized armed force. The German nationalist movement asked for Volksbewaffnung, a militia system according to the Swiss role model, but failed with those requests in the German revolutions of 1848–49. However, possession of guns and weapons was not generally restricted, but regulations about carrying arms in public came into use.

The general disarming of citizens and a generic gun law was imposed by the Allies after World War I. The law was introduced by the Weimar Republic; actual enforcement was not stringent, and there was no general disarmament immediately after the war. After incidents including the 1920 Kapp Putsch and the 1922 assassination of Walther Rathenau, the law was enforced more strictly. The Weimar Republic saw various Freikorps and paramilitary forces like the Reichsbanner Schwarz-Rot-Gold, Der Stahlhelm and the Nazi SA.

The requirement for trustworthiness of the owner and need for the special purpose of the user (e.g. hunting, sport or self-defence) has been included in German gun laws since then.

=== Regulation after the 1919 Treaty of Versailles ===
The Treaty of Versailles included firearm reducing stipulations. Article 169 targeted the state: "Within two months from the coming into force of the present Treaty, German arms, munitions, and war material, including anti-aircraft material, existing in Germany in excess of the quantities allowed, must be surrendered to the Governments of the Principal Allied and Associated Powers to be destroyed or rendered useless." Article 177 further banned all civilian use of firearms, any civilian instruction on their use, and any civilian shooting exercises activity, especially banning all organizations or associations from taking part in any such use and/or activity or allowing it to happen, in order to crush down on perceived Prussian militarism of the German people in general.

In order to comply with the Versailles Treaty, in 1919 the German government passed the Regulations on Weapons Ownership, which declared that "all firearms, as well as all kinds of firearms ammunition, are to be surrendered immediately." Under the regulations, anyone found in possession of a firearm or ammunition was subject to five years' imprisonment and a fine of 100,000 marks.

On 7 August 1920, rising fears whether or not Germany could have rebellions prompted the government to enact a second gun-regulation law called the Law on the Disarmament of the People. It put into effect the provisions of the Versailles Treaty in regard to the limit on military-type weapons.

However in spite of their intentions, all these laws failed to effectively put a complete stop to gun use and ownership. To fix this and fully comply to the Treaty, in 1928 the Law on Firearms and Ammunition was enacted. It relaxed gun restrictions as to ownership (but not as to their use and instruction on their use, as these were still illegal according to the Versailles Treaty) and put into effect a strict firearm licensing scheme. Under this scheme, Germans could possess firearms, but were required to have separate permits to do the following: own or sell firearms, carry firearms (including handguns), manufacture firearms, and professionally deal in firearms and ammunition. Furthermore, the law restricted ownership of firearms to "... people whose trustworthiness is not in question and who can show a need for a (gun) permit."

Especially car associations lobbied for an easy gun permit for car owners which was granted by the government for drivers traveling often in the countryside.

=== Gun regulations in Nazi Germany ===
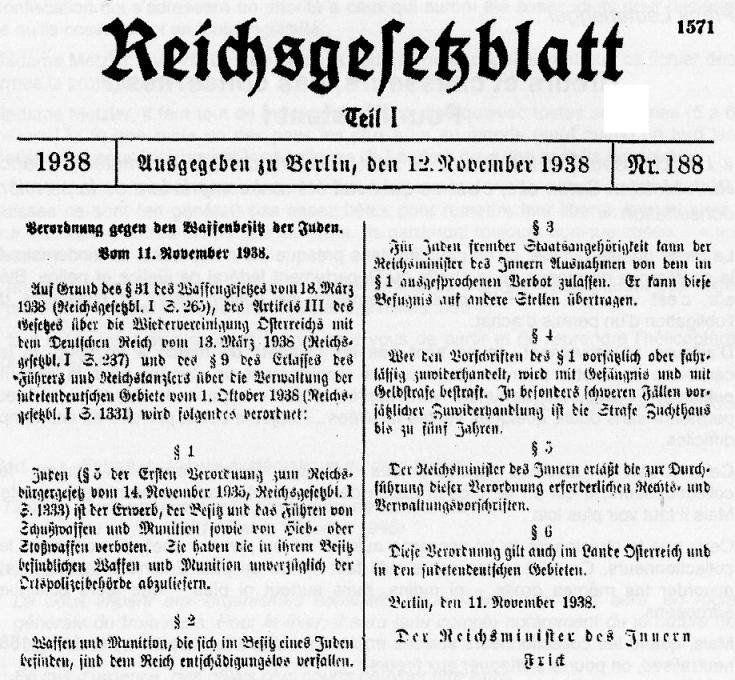
Nazi law to disarm Jews

The 1938 German Weapons Act, the precursor of the current weapons law, superseded the 1928 law. As under the 1928 law, citizens were required to have a permit to carry a firearm and a separate permit to acquire a firearm. But under the new law:

- Gun restriction laws applied only to handguns, not to long guns or ammunition. The 1938 revisions completely deregulated the acquisition and transfer of rifles and shotguns, and the possession of ammunition.
- The legal age at which guns could be purchased was lowered from 20 to 18.
- Permits were valid for three years, rather than one year.
- Holders of annual hunting permits, government workers, and NSDAP (the National Socialist German Workers' Party) members were no longer subject to gun ownership restrictions. Prior to the 1938 law, only officials of the central government, the states, and employees of the German Reichsbahn Railways were exempted.
- Manufacture of arms and ammunition continued to require a permit, with the provision that such permits would no longer be issued to any company even partly owned by Jews; Jews could not manufacture or deal in firearms or ammunition.

Under both the 1928 and 1938 acts, gun manufacturers and dealers were required to maintain records about purchasers of guns, with serial numbers. These records were to be delivered to a police authority for inspection at the end of each year.

The 1938 Regulations Against Jews' Possession of Weapons, which came into force the day after Kristallnacht, effectively deprived all Jews living under Nazi rule of the right to possess any form of weapons, including truncheons, knives, firearms and ammunition. Exceptions were made for Jews and Poles who were foreign nationals under §3 of the act. Before that, some police forces used the pre-existing "trustworthiness" clause to disarm Jews on the basis that "the Jewish population 'cannot be regarded as trustworthy'".

== Current laws ==
After 1945, even German police officers were initially not allowed to carry firearms. Private ownership of firearms was not allowed until 1956. The legal status returned essentially to that of the Law on Firearms and Ammunition of 1928. The law was thoroughly revised in 1972, when the new restrictive Federal Weapons Act (Bundeswaffengesetz) became effective, partly as a reaction to the terror of the Red Army Faction. It was developed in the Federal Weapons Act of 2002 and by amendments in 2008 and 2009. These laws were the result of a number of school shootings in Erfurt, Emsdetten and Winnenden. They led to a public debate, in which blame was attributed to various elements of youth culture and society, including violent computer games, television programs, rock music and private gun ownership.

The Weapons Act of 2002 increased the age requirements for licensed hunters and competition shooters. It also introduced the requirement of a psychological evaluation for people under the age of 25 to fulfil the requirement of personal adequacy for large-bore firearms.

The first amendment became effective on 1 April 2008. The intention of that amendment was to ban certain kinds of weapons like airsoft-guns, tasers, imitation firearms (Anscheinswaffen) and knives with blades longer than 12 cm from public places. They may still be carried in sealed wrappings and for professional or ceremonial purposes. Their use on private premises and in non-public places like gun clubs is not restricted.

The second amendment became effective on 17 July 2009. It introduced routine verifications of safe firearms storage by local firearms control offices at the homes of licensees. It also tightened the conditions for continuous necessity. A constitutional complaint (Verfassungsbeschwerde) was launched against the law, alleging a violation of the inviolability of the home, guaranteed by Art. 13 of the German constitution.

The weapons law does not apply to military use of weapons within the Bundeswehr or to the police. The identity cards of German troops and police officers contain a term allowing them to carry weapons. Nonetheless – within the military – issuance of guns and especially ammunition is very strictly controlled.

In Germany the possession of any firearm with a muzzle energy exceeding 7.5 J (5.5 ft⋅lb_{f}) (Note: For comparison, a .22LR cartridge has a muzzle energy of 159 J.) requires a valid firearms ownership license for any particular weapon. The current Federal Weapons Act adopts a two-tiered approach to firearms licensing.

The law on possession of suppressors follows the firearms they are designed for; if a firearm does not require a license, neither does its suppressor.

The only restriction on magazines for firearms in Germany applies to sports shooters: it is unlawful to use a magazine that can hold more than 10 rounds of ammunition when sports shooting with long weapons in Germany. The acquisition and possession of any magazine of any size for any firearm is legal without a license.

=== Firearms ownership license ===
A firearms ownership license (Waffenbesitzkarte or WBK), or an entry to an existing WBK, is mandatory for each firearm purchased. It entitles owners to purchase firearms and handle them on their own property and any private property with the property owner's consent. On public premises, a licensed firearm must be transported unloaded and in a stable, fully enclosing, locked container. A weapons ownership license does not entitle the owner to shoot the weapon or carry it on public premises without the prescribed container. Owners must obtain mandatory insurance and a means to securely store the weapon on their premises (a weapons locker). Blanket ownership licenses are issued to arms dealers, firearms experts and – with limitations – to collectors. In 2010 there were about four million legal private gun owners.

A number of criteria must be met before a firearms ownership license is issued:

- age 18 years (§ 4 WaffG)
- trustworthiness (§ 5 WaffG)
- personal adequacy (§ 6 WaffG)
- expert knowledge (§ 7 WaffG) and
- necessity (§ 8 WaffG).

Inheritors of legal firearms can obtain a permit without having to demonstrate expert knowledge or necessity, but without them the firearm has to be blocked by an arms dealer (§ 20 WaffG). An inheritor's license does not include the right to acquire or handle ammunition.

People who

- are convicted felons
- have a record of mental disorder or
- are deemed unreliable (this includes people with drug or alcohol addiction histories, and known violent or aggressive people)

are barred from obtaining a firearms ownership license.

Firearms ownership licenses are issued in three color-coded varieties, depending on the applicants' necessity. While self-defence is usually not accepted as a reasonable grounds for such a license, the following ones are:

- Competitive shooting: Members of registered gun clubs who the club attest have been practising at least once a month for at least a year can apply for a green license. These holders may purchase two handguns and three semi-automatic rifles compliant with the club rules. All firearms purchased must be pre-approved beforehand. Shooters wishing to purchase further firearms must acquire another approval from their association for each firearm, stating that the person participated in competitions regularly and is in need of the firearm. Additionally, people who are members of a gun club that is a member of a shooting association, are issued a yellow License, with which the holder is allowed to own an unlimited number of single-shot and bolt- or lever-action long guns, and single-shot handguns, without having to obtain prior approval or demonstrate individual necessity. However, no more than two firearms may be purchased in any six-month period by a competitive shooter.
- Hunting: People who have passed the German hunter's exam and purchased a hunters' license may purchase an unlimited number of long guns not banned for hunting use, which mostly only applied to fully automatic rifles. Hunters do not need prior approval, but have to register the firearm within two weeks from purchase. They are also allowed two handguns (Single-shot, revolvers, or semi-automatics), whose purchase has to be pre-approved. More handguns may be purchased if the person provides a genuine reason.
- Collecting and firearms' experts: A red license is issued to collectors and firearms experts. With this type of license, all kinds of firearms except "forbidden firearms" may be purchased without prior approval. While an expert's license is valid for all guns, collectors have to provide a "theme" of firearms they want to acquire, and are limited to those.

=== Firearms banned from sporting use ===
The following firearms are banned from sporting use in Germany, and may not be purchased with a license issued for sporting use, but are allowed on hunters' and collectors' licenses:

- Handguns with a barrel length of less than 7.62 cm (3 inches)
- Semi-automatic long guns with a built-in magazine with a capacity of more than 10 rounds
- Semi-automatic firearms that closely resemble a prohibited firearm (see below), if
  - the barrel length is less than 42 cm, or
  - the weapon is a bullpup design, or
  - the cartridge case of the ammunition the firearm is designed for is less than 40mm

=== Firearms that do not require a license ===
For people over 18 years of age, a license is not required to own a single-shot percussion firearm developed before 1 January 1871, or to own and carry any muzzle-loader with a flintlock or earlier design. However, the purchase of black powder or similar in order to use the firearms requires a license.

=== Prohibited firearms ===
Firearms that are prohibited in Germany may not be owned by anyone except with a special license from the Federal Criminal Police Office, which is only given to manufacturers, exporters, and, on rare occasions, collectors. The most important ones are:

- Firearms defined as "war weapons" by the law (tanks, rocket launchers, heavy machine guns)
- Fully automatic firearms
- Pump-action shotguns, if
  - the stock has been replaced by a pistol grip or
  - the overall length is less than 95 cm, or
  - the barrel length is less than 45 cm.
- Firearms designed to look like an everyday object in order to conceal their nature
- Handguns made after 1 January 1970, that fire ammunition with a caliber of less than 6.3 mm, except those for rimfire ammunition.

=== Firearms carry permit ===
Firearms carry permits (Waffenschein) entitle licensees to publicly carry legally owned weapons, whether concealed or not. A mandatory legal and safety class and shooting proficiency tests are required to obtain such a permit. Carry permits are usually only issued to people with a particular need for carrying a firearm. This includes some private security personnel and people living under a raised threat level like celebrities and politicians. They are valid up to three years and can be extended. Carrying at public events is prohibited. Licensed hunters do not need a permit to carry loaded weapons while hunting, and unloaded weapons while directly traveling to and from such an activity.

=== Small firearms carry permit ===
A small firearms carry permit (Kleiner Waffenschein) was introduced in 2002. It can be obtained without having to demonstrate expert knowledge, necessity or a mandatory insurance. The only requirements are that the applicant be of legal age, trustworthy and personally adequate. It entitles the licensee to publicly carry gas pistols (both of the blank and irritant kind) and flare guns. These types of firearms are freely available to adults; only the actual carrying on public property requires the permit. Similar to the full permit, carrying at public events is prohibited.

== See also ==
- Forum Waffenrecht
