= 2005 Brazilian firearms and ammunition referendum =

Referendum in Brazil on guns and ammunition

- 23 October 2005
- Should the commerce of firearms and ammunition be prohibited in Brazil?
- Outcome: Brazil approves the commerce of firearms and ammunition. However, President Lula maintains the prohibition.

Results
Choice	Votes	%
Yes	33,333,045	36.06%
No	59,109,265	63.94%
Valid votes	92,442,310	96.92%
Invalid or blank votes	2,933,514	3.08%
Total votes	95,375,824	100.00%
Registered voters/turnout	122,042,615	78.15%
- Results by state No 50–59% 60–69% 70–79% 80–89%

On 23 October 2005, Brazil held a country-wide referendum on article 35 of the Disarmament Statute to determine whether to approve or disapprove the article, which states in full, "The sale of firearms and ammunition is prohibited in the entire national territory, except to those entities provided in article 6 of this Law." ("Art. 35. É proibida a comercialização de arma de fogo e munição em todo o território nacional, salvo para as entidades previstas no art. 6^{o} desta Lei.") The referendum failed by nearly two-thirds.

The referendum and its date had been provided by the Disarmament Statute itself (art. 35, §1^{o}). During the drafting and development of the law, it had been decided that article 35 should be submitted to a referendum because of the importance of its subject. On 7 July 2005, the Federal Senate of Brazil promulgated legislative decree 780, which authorized the referendum. Article 2 of its decree stipulated that the public consultation should employ the following question: "Should commerce in firearms and ammunition be prohibited in Brazil?" ("O comércio de armas de fogo e munição deve ser proibido no Brasil?")

== Background ==
Voting was compulsory for people between the ages of 18 and 70. The belief of a fundamental natural human right to self-defense, low efficacy of police, high levels of use of illegal weapons in crimes in contrast to a very rare usage of legal weapons, are some of the factors that may have influenced 65% of Brazilian people to vote against the ban proposal. The gun ban proposal received broad support in the press, while celebrities were generally in favor of it, only Brazil's anti-ban social groups and right-wing press, most importantly Veja the Brazilian news magazine (indeed weekly publication of any kind) with the largest paid circulation in the country. Other media, like the powerful Globo group (owners of Brazil's largest TV network Rede Globo) and newspapers of record like Folha de S.Paulo advocated clearly pro gun ban. The then President Lula was a self-declared pro gun ban power.

According to the Brazilian constitution, every citizen has the right to self-defense and the pro-gun campaigners focused their arguments on this constitutional right, as well as making economic arguments.

A decisive argument made by the pro-gun campaigners was to question the morality of the government removing a right from its citizens, resulting in a strong feeling among voters that no rights should ever be allowed to be taken away by the government. Also, there were debates about the significant cultural status of gun ownership in the southern states of the country.

Another major argument used by the pro-gun ownership campaigners was that the absolute majority of the gun crimes in Brazil were committed with unregistered and illegal guns, specially high caliber guns, that were already forbidden in Brazil and due to that, it would be of no use to forbid law-abiding citizens to own legal registered guns in accordance to the law. This argument was strongly reinforced by the fact that the regions where gun ownership is widespread were the ones with the smallest number of gun-related deaths. In the South region where there is the highest number of legal guns per citizen only 59% of all murders were caused by firearms in contrast to 70% in the Northeast where there is the lowest number of legal firearms per citizen.

The anti-gun proponents argued that guns are dangerous for society and that their only reason to exist is to harm others.

The anti-gun campaign received widespread support from several famous actors, musicians and other Brazilian celebrities and a noticeable support from the nation's main TV station, Rede Globo.

The ban had the backing of the federal government and sections of the Brazilian Roman Catholic Church. The anti-gun lobby received vast support and free coverage from the press, including Rede Globo, Brazil's largest TV network despite its parent company fairly neutral stance which eventually was reflected. By that time most Protestant-evangelical news organizations had taken a clearly anti-ban stance (including the Igreja Universal do Reino de Deus-owned Rede Record, Globo's main competitor at the time).

=== International support ===
The IANSA member groups Instituto Sou da Paz and Viva Rio campaigned for a complete ban on civilian gun sales in Brazil, in support of the referendum. A week before the vote, IANSA, an international gun control organization coordinated an international day of support for the Brazilian ban, with demonstrations taking place in Britain, Italy, South Africa, and other countries. IANSA urged support of the ban to "reinforce the movement in favor of gun control in other Latin American countries riddled with armed violence, and back the efforts to control private gun ownership at [an] international level."

== Results ==
Although the federal government, the Catholic Church, and the United Nations argued in favor of the proposal, the result was a victory for those against the ban, with over 63% of the voters opposed.

Choice	Votes	%
For	33,333,045	36.06
Against	59,109,265	63.94
Total	92,442,310	100.00
Valid votes	92,442,310	96.92
Invalid votes	1,604,307	1.68
Blank votes	1,329,207	1.39
Total votes	95,375,824	100.00
Registered voters/turnout	122,042,615	78.15
Source: Superior Electoral Court

=== By region ===
Region	Registered	Turnout	Votes		%	
Region	Registered	Turnout	Yes	No	Yes	No
Midwest	8,545,003	75.38%	1,971,506	4,308,155	31.40%	68.60%
North	8,418,948	72.10%	1,718,131	4,232,295	28.87%	71.13%
Northeast	32,991,409	74.78%	10,147,793	13,735,686	42.49%	57.51%
South	18,564,114	81.78%	3,028,661	11,812,085	20.41%	79.59%
Southeast	53,523,141	80.36%	16,466,954	25,021,044	39.69%	60.31%

=== By state ===
State	Registered	Turnout	Votes		%	
State	Registered	Turnout	Yes	No	Yes	No
Acre	389,137	69.49%	43,025	221,828	16.24%	83.76%
Alagoas	1,774,914	73.05%	568,083	690,448	45.14%	54.86%
Amazonas	1,688,287	73.16%	374,090	839,007	30.84%	69.16%
Amapá	332,589	75.61%	65,593	181,764	26.52%	73.48%
Bahia	8,952,123	72.07%	2,770,718	3,448,907	44.55%	55.45%
Ceará	5,144,516	76.53%	1,730,922	2,090,103	45.30%	54.70%
Espírito Santo	2,253,444	77.19%	736,510	982,056	43.62%	56.38%
Federal District	1,564,500	77.19%	528,169	695,328	43.17%	56.83%
Goiás	3,620,968	74.39%	839,508	1,776,072	32.10%	67.90%
Maranhão	3,735,131	70.72%	995,849	1,565,845	38.87%	61.13%
Minas Gerais	13,320,622	78.28%	3,889,398	6,155,748	38.72%	61.28%
Mato Grosso	1,854,477	72.78%	305,457	1,016,288	23.11%	76.89%
Mato Grosso do Sul	1,505,058	72.78%	298,372	820,467	26.67%	73.33%
Pará	3,999,863	72.04%	928,006	1,894,619	32.88%	67.12%
Paraíba	2,468,633	78.34%	690,751	1,183,463	36.866%	63.14%
Paraná	6,948,437	80.45%	1,463,776	3,988,689	26.85%	73.15%
Pernambuco	5,656,670	76.85%	1,918,048	2,296,510	45.51%	54.49%
Piauí	1,990,993	76.65%	545,828	928,883	37.09%	62.91%
Rio de Janeiro	10,645,180	81.17%	3,155,897	5,124,572	38.11%	61.89%
Rio Grande do Norte	1,558,081	76.99%	575,783	938,514	38.02%	61.98%
Rio Grande do Sul	7,593,504	82.88%	812,207	5,353,854	13.17%	86.83%
Rondônia	954,308	70.83%	144,117	519,425	21.72%	78.28%
Roraima	216,022	73.49%	23,453	132,928	15.00%	85.00%
Santa Catarina	4,022,170	82.01%	752,678	2,469,542	23.36%	76.64%
São Paulo	27,303,895	81.32%	8,685,149	12,788,668	40.45%	59.55%
Sergipe	1,245,913	78.68%	351,811	596,013	37.12%	62.88%
Tocantins	838,742	71.15%	139,847	442,724	24.01%	75.99%

== See also ==
- Gun politics
- Gun politics in Brazil
