= ProTell =

ProTell (formally: "The Society for Liberal Weapons Rights") is a Swiss gun-rights advocacy group based in Bern, Switzerland.

The association was founded in 1978 with the purpose of defending the right of law-abiding citizens to carry arms, and is opposed to any restrictions in this regard. Its name refers to the famous legend of Wilhelm Tell, shooting the apple off his son's head with a single arrow. ProTell reports some 8500 members as of 2016. This corresponds to some 6.4% of the number of registered shooters in the Schweizer Schiesssportverband.

ProTell was one of the principal opponents to the federal popular initiative "For the protection against gun violence", brought to referendum on February 13, 2011. The initiative was broadly rejected by the voters.

== See also ==
- Gun laws in Switzerland
- Overview of gun laws by nation
