= 2024 Campo Grande mayoral election =

Local election in Brazil

2024 Campo Grande municipal election
- 6 October 2024 (first round); 27 October 2024 (second round)
- Turnout: 74.50% (first round); 71.40% (second round)
- Mayoral election
- Opinion polls
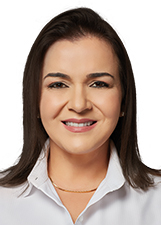

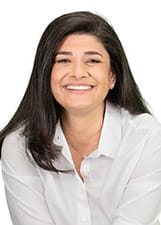
Candidate	Adriane Lopes	Rose Modesto
Party	PP	UNIÃO
Alliance	Sem Medo de Fazer o Certo	Unidos por Campo Grande
Running mate	Camilla Nascimento	Roberto Oshiro
Popular vote	222,699	210,112
Percentage	51.45%	48.55%
Mayor before election
Adriane Lopes
PP
Elected mayor
Adriane Lopes
PP
- City Council election
Party	Leader	Vote %	Seats	+/–
Municipal Chamber
PP	João Rocha			
PSDB	—N/a			
MDB	Loester Nunes de Oliveira			
PT	Ayrton Araújo			
PSD	—N/a			
PODE	Clodoilson Pires			
UNIÃO	Alírio Villasanti			
PSB	Carlão			
Republicanos	—N/a			
Avante	—N/a			
PRD	—N/a			
This lists parties that won seats. See the complete results below.

A mayoral election in Campo Grande was held on 6 October 2024. Voters will elect a mayor, vice-mayor and 29 councilors for a four-year term.

A second round will take place on 27 October 2024. The mayor's term will begin on 1 January 2025 and end on 31 December 2028. The current mayor is Adriane Lopes, who took office after Marquinhos Trad resigned on 2 April 2022.

== Background ==
Campo Grande, known for its diverse culture and significant economic role in the region, has a history of competitive elections. The municipal elections are part of a broader electoral process that occurs every four years, where voters across Brazil elect local officials in over 5,500 municipalities. The last mayoral election in Campo Grande, in 2020, resulted in the victory of incumbent Marquinhos Trad, from the Social Democratic Party (PSD) in the first round. Trad obtained 218,418 votes or 52,58% of the valid votes.

== Electoral calendar ==
Electoral calendar announced by the Superior Electoral Court (TSE) on 3 January 2024
7 March – 5 April	Period of the 'party window' for councillors. During this period, the councillors are able to move to other political parties in order to run for election while not losing their respective political terms.
6 April	Deadline for all parties and party federations to obtain the registration of their statutes at the Superior Electoral Court and for all candidates to have their electoral domicile in the constituency in which they wish to contest the elections with the affiliation granted by the party.
15 May	Start of the preliminary fundraising campaign in the form of collective financing for potential candidates. During this period, candidates are not allowed to ask for votes and are still subjected to obey the rules regarding electoral propaganda on the Internet.
20 July – 5 August	On this date, party conventions begin to deliberate on coalitions and choose candidates for mayors and councillors tickets. Parties have until 15 August to register their names with the Brazilian Election Justice.
16 August	Beginning of electoral campaigns on an equal basis, with any advertising or demonstration explicitly requesting for votes before the date being considered irregular and subject to fines.
30 August –3 October	Broadcasting of free electoral propaganda on radio and television.
6 October	Date of mayoral elections.
27 October	Date of a possible second round in cities with more than 200,000 voters in which the most voted candidate for mayor has not reached 50% of the valid votes.

== Candidates ==
=== Presumptive candidates ===
Party	Mayoral candidate	Running mate		Coalition
Workers' Party (PT 13)	Camila Jara: Federal Deputy for Mato Grosso do Sul (2023–present); Councillor of Campo Grande (2021–2023)	Workers' Party (PT)	Zeca do PT: State Deputy of Mato Grosso do Sul (1991–1999; 2023–present); Federal Deputy for Mato Grosso do Sul (2015–2019); Councillor of Campo Grande (2013–2015); Governor of Mato Grosso do Sul (1999–2007)	Brazil of Hope (PT, PCdoB, PV)

=== Potential candidates ===
The mayoral race in Campo Grande has attracted several candidates from various political backgrounds. This is the list of potential candidates:

Brazil Union (UNIÃO)

- Rose Modesto – Councillor of Campo Grande (2009–2015); Vice Governor of Mato Grosso do Sul (2015–2019); Federal Deputy for Mato Grosso do Sul (2019–2023) and teacher. She is currently leading in the polls with significant support.

Progressistas (PP)

- Adriane Lopes – Vice Mayor of Campo Grande (2017–2022) and Mayor of Campo Grande (2022–present). Lopes is seeking re-election as an incumbent, with a strong base in the city's administration.

Brazilian Social Democracy Party (PSDB)

- Beto Pereira – Mayor of Terenos (2005–2013); State Deputy of Mato Grosso do Sul (2015–2019); Federal Deputy for Mato Grosso do Sul (2019–present) and businessman. Pereira is a federal deputy backed by the state governor for the mayoral race.

New Party (NOVO)

- Beto Figueiró – Candidate for Vice Governor in the 2022 Mato Grosso do Sul gubernatorial election and lawyer.

Christian Democracy (DC)

- Ubirajara Martins – Lawyer.

Socialism and Liberty Party (PSOL)

- Luso Queiroz – Office assistant.

Democratic Renewal Party (PRD)

- André Luiz – Councillor of Campo Grande (2021–present) and teacher.
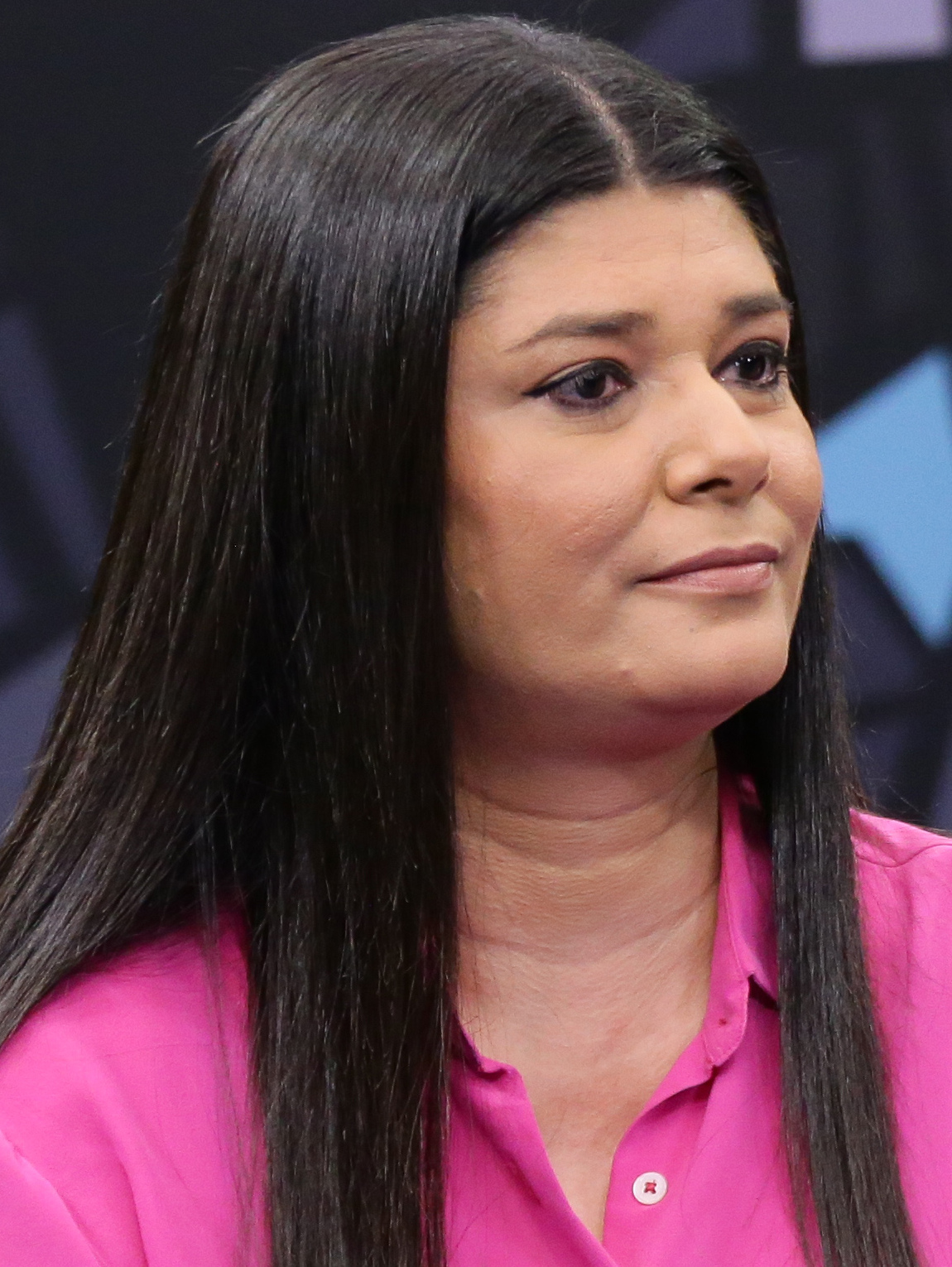
Federal Deputy
Rose Modesto (UNIÃO)
from Fátima do Sul

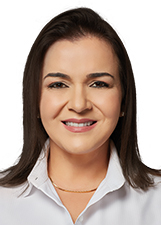
Mayor of Campo Grande
Adriane Lopes (PP)
from Grandes Rios

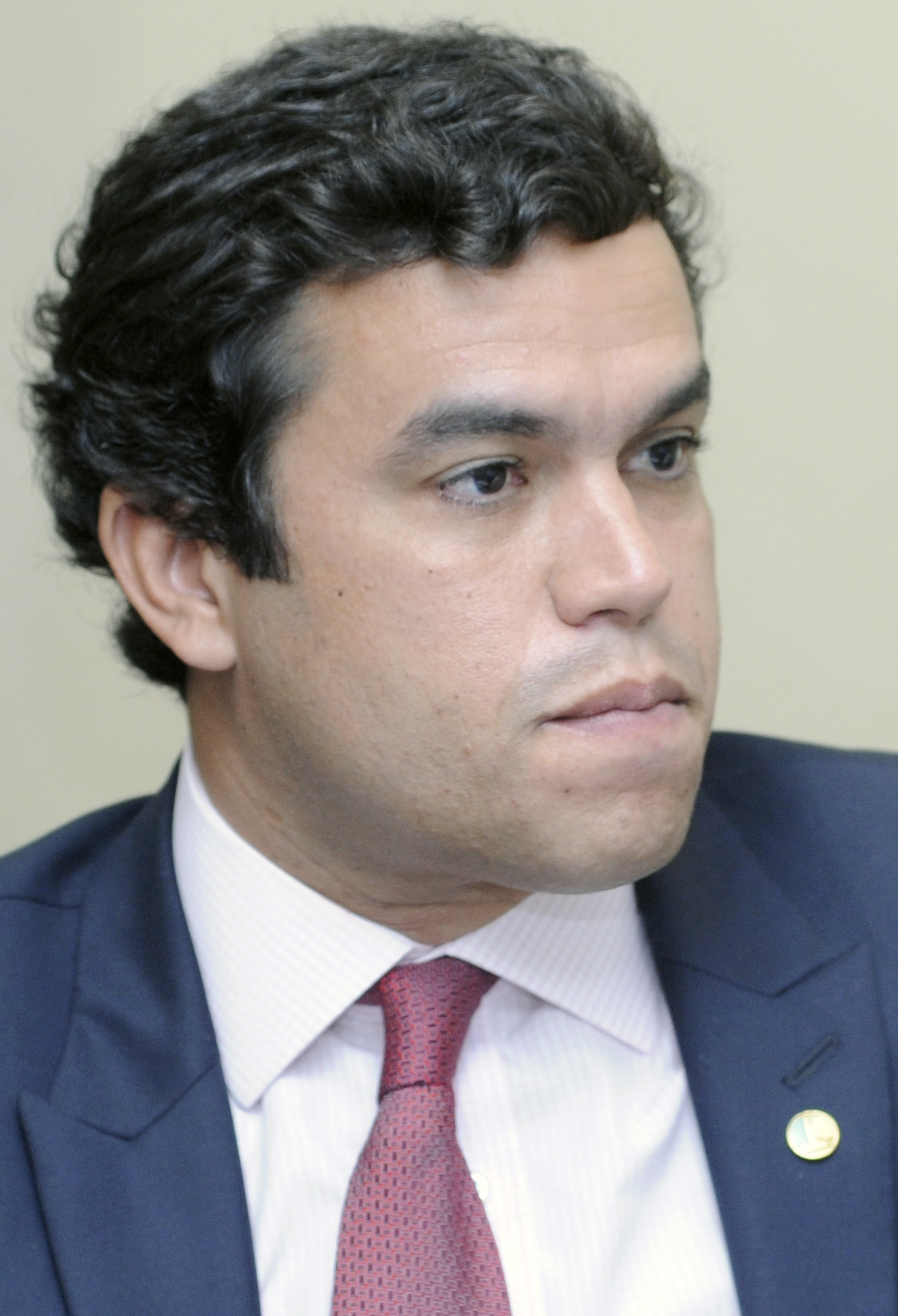
Federal Deputy
Beto Pereira (PSDB)
from Campo Grande

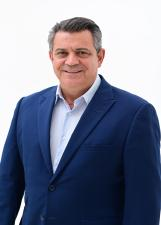
Lawyer
Beto Figueiró (NOVO)
from Campo Grande

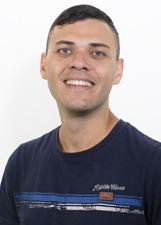
Office assistant
Luso Queiroz (PSOL)
from Campo Grande

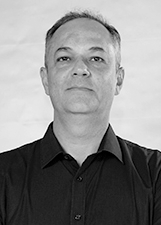
Councillor
André Luis (PRD)
from Uberlândia

=== Withdrawn candidates ===
Brazilian Socialist Party (PSB)

- Carlão – Councillor of Campo Grande (2009–present) and president of the Municipal Chamber of Campo Grande (2021–present).

Democratic Labour Party (PDT)

- Lucas de Lima – Councillor of Campo Grande (2017–2019); State Deputy of Mato Grosso do Sul (2019–present) and radio personality.

Social Democratic Party (PSD)

- Pedrossian Neto – State Deputy of Mato Grosso do Sul (2023–present) and economist.
- Jaime Verruck – Secretary of State for Environment, Development, Science, Technology and Innovation of Mato Grosso do Sul and economist.

Liberal Party (PL)

- Coronel David – Candidate for State Deputy of Mato Grosso do Sul in the 2014 Mato Grosso gubernatorial election; candidate for mayor of Campo Grande in the 2016 Campo Grande mayoral election; State Deputy of Mato Grosso do Sul (2019–present) and military police officer.
- Rafael Tavares – Candidate for Councillor in the 2020 Campo Grande mayoral election and State Deputy of Mato Grosso do Sul (2023–2024).
- João Henrique – Candidate for councillor in the 2016 Campo Grande mayoral election; State Deputy of Mato Grosso do Sul (2019–present) and lawyer.
- Tenente Portela – First Alternate of the senator Tereza Cristina, army lieutenant and president of the Liberal Party in Campo Grande.
- Marcos Pollon – Federal Deputy for Mato Grosso do Sul (2023–present), lawyer, activist, YouTuber and digital influencer.

With the announcement of former President Jair Bolsonaro's support for Beto Pereira's candidacy and the support coming from the Liberal Party itself, the party's potential candidates had their candidacies automatically withdrawn. Pollon, who had even rehearsed launching his potential election bid, was removed from his position as state president of the Liberal Party in Mato Grosso do Sul due to his disobedience and replaced by Tenente Portela (PL).

Brazilian Democratic Movement (MDB)

- André Puccinelli – State Deputy of Mato Grosso do Sul (1987–1995); Federal Deputy for Mato Grosso do Sul (1995–1997); Mayor of Campo Grande (1997–2005); Governor of Mato Grosso do Sul (2007–2015) and physician. Puccinelli expressed interest in returning to local politics; however, he withdrew his candidacy on 25 June 2024 for lack of political support.
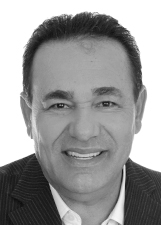
Councillor
Carlão (PSB)
from Pedro Gomes

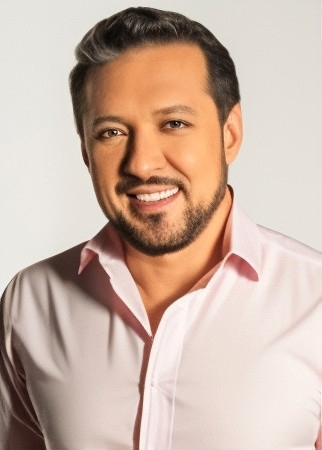
State Deputy
Lucas de Lima (PDT)
from Alto Alegre

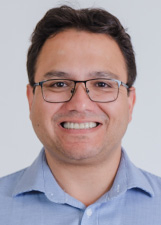
State Deputy
Pedrossian Neto (PSD)
from Campo Grande

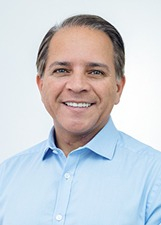
State Deputy
Coronel David (PL)
from Campo Grande

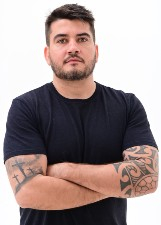
State Deputy
Rafael Tavares (PL)
from Campo Grande

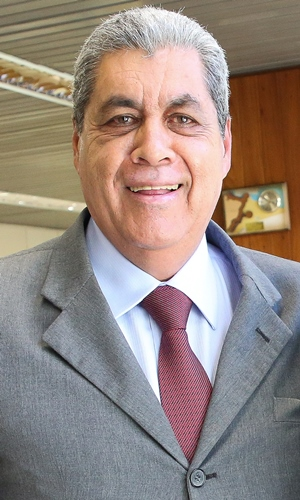
Governor of Mato Grosso do Sul
André Puccinelli (MDB)
from Viareggio

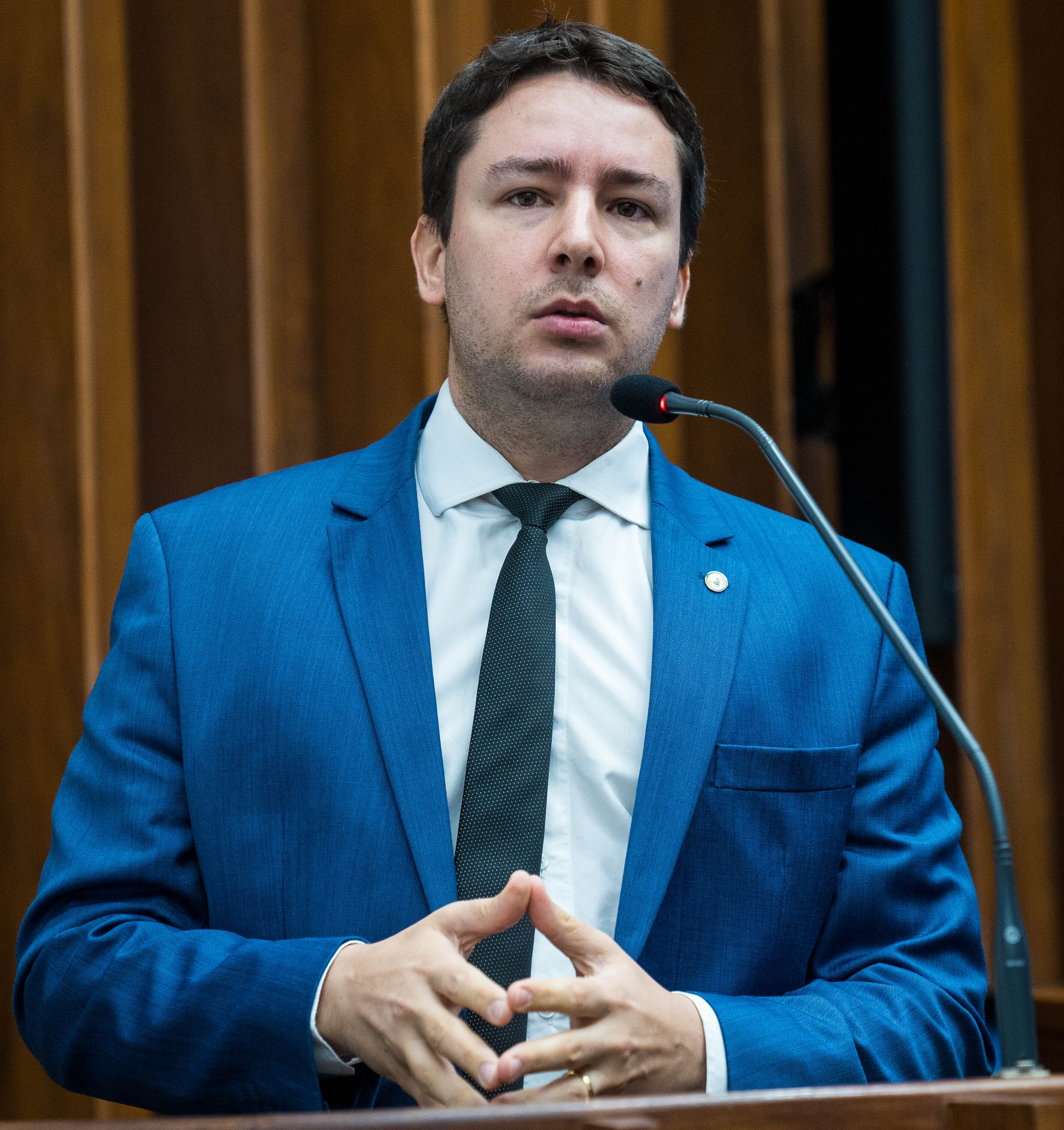
State Deputy
João Henrique (PL)
from Campo Grande

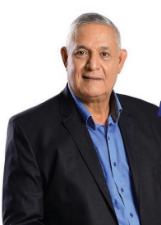
Army Lieutenant
Tenente Portela (PL)
from Tarabai

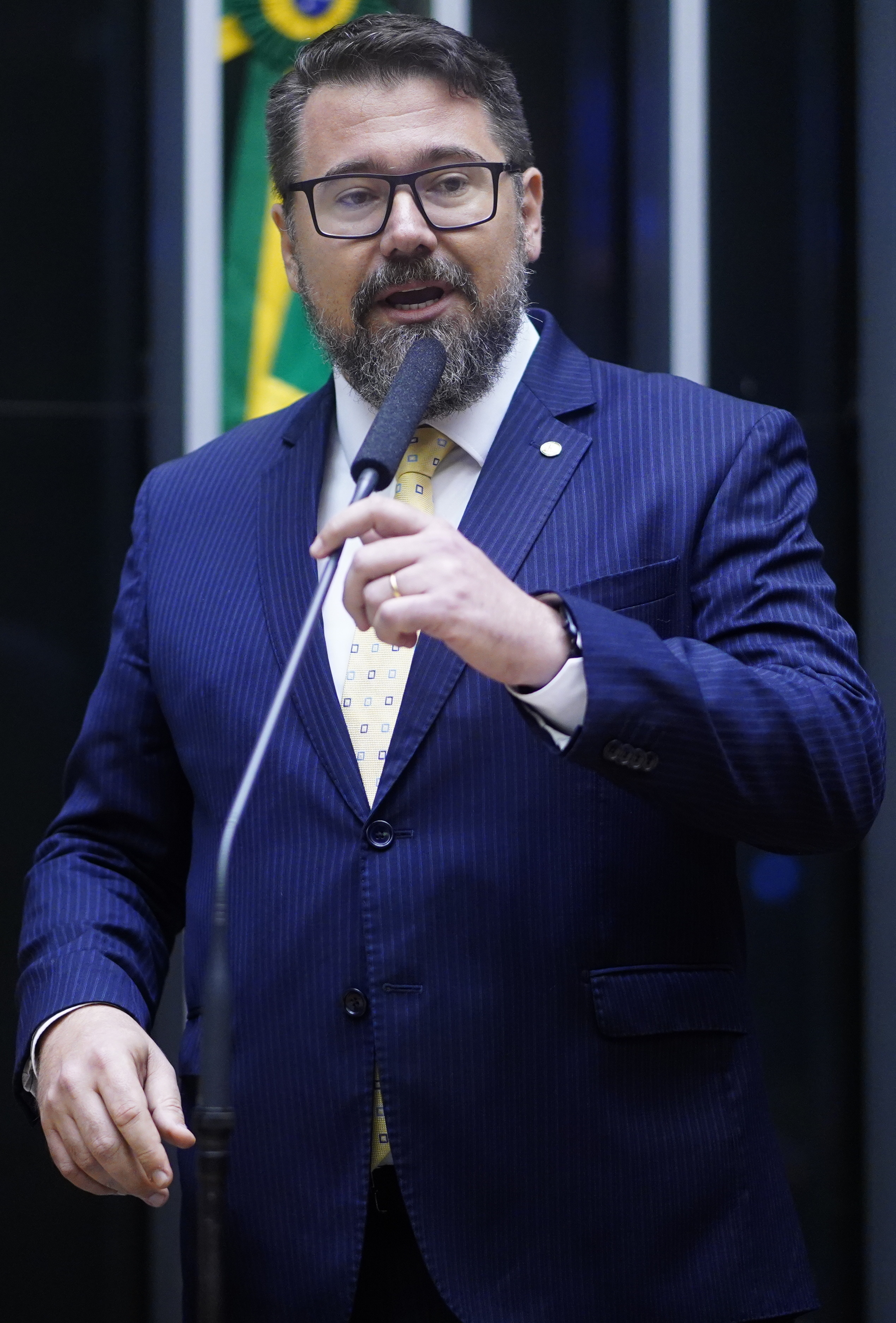
Federal Deputy
Marcos Pollon (PL)
from Dourados

== Campaign ==
The campaign period officially begins on 16 August 2024, with candidates allowed to advertise their platforms, including on the internet. Free airtime on radio and television will start on 30 August, providing candidates with a platform to reach a wider audience.

== Outgoing Municipal Chamber ==
The result of the last municipal election and the current situation in the Municipal Chamber is given below:

Affiliation	Members		+/–
Affiliation	Elected	Current	+/–
PP	1	8	▲7
PSDB	3	7	▲4
MDB	3	3	Steady
PT	2	2	Steady
PODE	3	2	▼1
PSD	5	2	▼3
UNIÃO	didn't exist	1	▲1
Avante	0	1	▲1
PRD	didn't exist	1	▲1
PSB	1	1	Steady
Republicanos	2	1	▼1
REDE	1	0	▼1
Solidarity	1	0	▼1
PDT	1	0	▼1
PTB	1	extinct party (Note: Brazilian Labour Party (PTB) and Patriota merged into the Democratic Renewal Party (PRD) in November 2023.)	▼1
PSL	1	extinct party (Note: Democrats (DEM) and the Social Liberal Party (PSL) merged into the Brazil Union in February 2022.)	▼1
DEM	2	extinct party (Note: Democrats (DEM) and the Social Liberal Party (PSL) merged into the Brazil Union in February 2022.)	▼2
Patriota	2	extinct party (Note: Brazilian Labour Party (PTB) and Patriota merged into the Democratic Renewal Party (PRD) in November 2023.)	▼2
Total	29		

== Opinion polls ==
=== First round ===
2024

Pollster/client(s)	Date(s) conducted	Sample size	Modesto UNIÃO	Pereira PSDB	Lopes PP	Jara PT	Pollon PL	Figueiró NOVO	André PRD	Martins DC	Queiroz PSOL	Others	Abst. Undec.	Lead
Ranking Pesquisa	4–8 July	2,000	31.5%	20%	17%	5%	3.5%	3%	0.7%	0.2%	0.1%	—N/a	19%	11.5%
Ranking Pesquisa	4–8 July	2,000	34%	21.2%	18%	5.3%	—N/a	3.2%	—N/a	0.3%	—N/a	—N/a	18%	12.8%
Ranking Pesquisa	4–8 July	2,000	36.6%	22.4%	18.2%	5.4%	—N/a	—N/a	—N/a	—N/a	—N/a	—N/a	17.4%	14.2%
25 June–1 July			André Puccinelli (MDB) withdraws his potential candidacy for lack of political support. Marcos Pollon (PL) announces his own potential candidacy.											
Pollster/client(s)	Date(s) conducted	Sample size	Modesto UNIÃO	Lopes PP	Puccinelli MDB	Pereira PSDB	André PRD	Jara PT	Figueiró NOVO	Catan PL	Martins DC	Others	Abst. Undec.	Lead
Futura/100% Cidades	6–13 June	600	16.4%	11.3%	28.4%	10.3%	0.5%	6.5%	1.3%	—N/a	1.9%	3.6% (Note: Rafael Tavares (PL))	19.9%	12%
Ranking Pesquisa	4–9 June	2,000	25%	22%	18%	14%	0.6%	2.3%	1.8%	1.5%	0.3%	0.2% (Note: Luso Queiroz (PSOL))	14.3%	3%
Ranking Pesquisa	4–9 June	2,000	25.3%	22.4%	18.3%	15%	—N/a	2.5%	—N/a	—N/a	—N/a	—N/a	14.5%	2.9%
Ranking Pesquisa	4–9 June	2,000	37.3%	30%	—N/a	16%	—N/a	2.7%	—N/a	—N/a	—N/a	—N/a	14%	7.3%
Ranking Pesquisa	6–11 May	2,000	24.3%	21.6%	16.4%	11%	—N/a	3%	1.3%	—N/a	0.2%	1% (Note: Rafael Tavares (PL))	20%	2.7%
Ranking Pesquisa	6–11 May	2,000	24.7%	22.5%	17%	13%	—N/a	3.2%	2%	—N/a	—N/a	—N/a	17.6%	2.2%
Ranking Pesquisa	6–11 May	2,000	36%	29%	—N/a	14%	—N/a	3.3%	—N/a	—N/a	—N/a	—N/a	17.7%	7%
Ranking Pesquisa	6–11 May	2,000	37%	30%	—N/a	15%	—N/a	—N/a	—N/a	—N/a	—N/a	—N/a	18%	7%
6–16 May			Lucas de Lima (PDT), Rafael Tavares (PL) and Coronel David (PL) decide to withdraw their potential candidacies for mayor.											
Pollster/client(s)	Date(s) conducted	Sample size	Modesto UNIÃO	Lopes PP	Puccinelli MDB	Pereira PSDB	Lima PDT	Jara PT	Figueiró NOVO	André PRD	Tavares PL	Others	Abst. Undec.	Lead
Paraná Pesquisas	19–24 April	800	19.5%	14.4%	26.4%	11.5%	—N/a	6.5%	—N/a	—N/a	5%	1.3% (Note: Jaime Verruck (PSD))	15.5%	6.9%
Paraná Pesquisas	19–24 April	800	19.4%	14.1%	26.5%	11.1%	—N/a	6.5%	—N/a	—N/a	—N/a	6.4% (Note: Marcos Pollon (PL) with 5.1% and Jaime Verruck (PSD) with 1.3%)	16%	7.1%
Paraná Pesquisas	19–24 April	800	15.9%	12.3%	22.8%	9.8%	—N/a	5.9%	—N/a	—N/a	—N/a	21.4% (Note: Capitão Contar (PRTB) with 20.4% and Jaime Verruck (PSD) with 1%)	12.1%	2.4%
Paraná Pesquisas	19–24 April	800	19.8%	14.4%	26.5%	11.6%	—N/a	6.5%	—N/a	—N/a	5.3%	—N/a	16%	6.7%
Paraná Pesquisas	19–24 April	800	28.4%	16.4%	—N/a	14.2%	—N/a	8%	—N/a	—N/a	7.6%	—N/a	25.4%	12%
Ranking Pesquisa	2–7 April	2,000	24%	21%	16%	8.3%	5%	3.2%	1.2%	0.5%	0.8%	—N/a	20%	3%
Ranking Pesquisa	2–7 April	2,000	32%	28%	—N/a	11%	—N/a	5.8%	—N/a	—N/a	1.2%	—N/a	22%	4%
Ranking Pesquisa	2–7 April	2,000	34%	31%	—N/a	12%	—N/a	—N/a	—N/a	—N/a	—N/a	—N/a	23%	3%
12 March–5 April			Rafael Tavares leaves the Brazilian Labour Renewal Party (PRTB) and joins the Liberal Party (PL); along with the announcement of his potential candidacy for mayor. Ubirajara Martins is announced as a potential candidate by the Christian Democracy (DC). Pedrossian Neto's potential candidacy is suspended by the Social Democratic Party (PSD).											
Pollster/client(s)	Date(s) conducted	Sample size	Puccinelli MDB	Modesto UNIÃO	Lopes PP	Lima PDT	Pereira PSDB	Contar PRTB	David PL	Pedrossian PSD	Jara PT	Others	Abst. Undec.	Lead
Ranking Pesquisa	4–9 March	2,000	13%	18.7%	17.2%	8%	6.8%	—N/a	5.5%	5.7%	3.6%	0.5% (Note: João Henrique (PL))	21%	1.5%
Ranking Pesquisa	4–9 March	2,000	—N/a	23.6%	22%	8.6%	7.5%	—N/a	6%	6.3%	4%	—N/a	22%	1.6%
Ranking Pesquisa	4–9 March	2,000	—N/a	30%	29.4%	—N/a	12.1%	—N/a	—N/a	—N/a	5%	—N/a	23.5%	0.6%
Ranking Pesquisa	26–30 January	1,000	17.4%	16%	15.2%	8%	6.1%	4%	3.8%	3.3%	3%	0.8% (Note: Marcos Pollon (PL) with 0.6% and Rafael Tavares (PRTB) with 0.2%)	22.4%	1.4%
Ranking Pesquisa	26–30 January	1,000	—N/a	22%	20%	10.3%	9.2%	—N/a	5%	4.5%	4%	—N/a	25%	2%
Ranking Pesquisa	26–30 January	1,000	—N/a	25.6%	23.5%	—N/a	11.4%	—N/a	—N/a	7.2%	6.3%	—N/a	26%	2.1%
Ranking Pesquisa	26–30 January	1,000	—N/a	26.2%	27.3%	—N/a	13.8%	—N/a	—N/a	—N/a	—N/a	—N/a	32.7%	1.1%

2023

Pollster/client(s)	Date(s) conducted	Sample size	Puccinelli MDB	Modesto UNIÃO	Lopes PP	Lima PDT	Pereira PSDB	Zeca PT	Contar PRTB	David PL	Jara PT	Others	Abst. Undec.	Lead
Ranking Pesquisa	20–30 November	2,000	18%	14.7%	13%	8.4%	6.3%	—N/a	4.5%	3.6%	2%	4.8% (Note: Pedrossian Neto (PSD) with 2.2%; Beto Figueiró (NOVO) with 1.1%; Tio Trutis (PL) with 1%; Marcos Pollon (PL) with 0.3% and Rodrigo Lins (PRTB) with 0.2%)	24.7%	3.3%
Ranking Pesquisa	20–30 November	2,000	—N/a	21.3%	18%	10.4%	7.2%	—N/a	—N/a	6.3%	3%	7.4% (Note: Pedrossian Neto (PSD) with 4.5%; Beto Figueiró (NOVO) with 1.5% and Tio Trutis (PL) with 1.4%)	26.4%	3.3%
Ranking Pesquisa	20–30 November	2,000	—N/a	—N/a	26.2%	16.1%	13%	—N/a	—N/a	9%	5.2%	—N/a	30.5%	10.1%
Ranking Pesquisa	10–16 September	2,000	15.2%	12.05%	9.1%	10.3%	7.2%	4%	3%	3.2%	—N/a	4.85% (Note: Pedrossian Neto (PSD) with 2.3%; Beto Figueiró (NOVO) with 1%; Marcos Pollon (PL) with 0.8%; Mandetta (UNIÃO) with 0.6% and Rodrigo Lins (PRTB) with 0.15%)	31.1%	3.15%
Ranking Pesquisa	10–16 September	2,000	—N/a	17.1%	12%	14%	9.7%	—N/a	—N/a	—N/a	4%	2% (Note: Márcio Fernandes (MDB))	41.2%	3.1%
Ranking Pesquisa	10–16 September	2,000	—N/a	—N/a	14%	16.5%	11.9%	—N/a	—N/a	5.5%	5.2%	—N/a	46.9%	2.5%
Ranking Pesquisa	10–16 September	2,000	—N/a	—N/a	18%	—N/a	15.9%	—N/a	—N/a	6%	5.6%	2.1% (Note: Beto Figueiró (NOVO))	52.4%	2.1%
Ranking Pesquisa	10–16 September	2,000	—N/a	—N/a	18.1%	—N/a	15.8%	7.6%	—N/a	—N/a	—N/a	6% (Note: Pedrossian Neto (PSD) with 4.4%; Marcos Pollon (PL) with 1.6%)	52.5%	2.3%
IPEMS	18–19 July	400	—N/a	—N/a	26.17%	—N/a	18.44%	25.34%	—N/a	—N/a	—N/a	9.18% (Note: Marcos Pollon (PL))	20.87%	0.83%
Ranking Pesquisa	4–11 July	1,200	10%	9.25%	7%	8.5%	6.5%	5.25%	3.25%	3%	—N/a	1.25% (Note: Marcos Pollon (PL) with 0.75%; Tatiana Ujacow (REDE) with 0.25% and Beto Figueiró (DC) with 0.25%)	46%	0.75%
Ranking Pesquisa	4–11 July	1,200	—N/a	—N/a	7.75%	15.5%	6.5%	9%	—N/a	5.5%	—N/a	0.5% (Note: Beto Figueiró (DC) with 0.5%)	55.25%	6.5%
Ranking Pesquisa	4–11 July	1,200	—N/a	—N/a	8.25%	15%	—N/a	—N/a	—N/a	—N/a	3%	19.25% (Note: Reinaldo Azambuja (PSDB) with 16.25%; Márcio Fernandes (MDB) with 2% and Marcos Pollon (PL) with 1%)	54.5%	1.25%
Ranking Pesquisa	4–11 July	1,200	—N/a	—N/a	9.5%	—N/a	8.25%	14.5%	—N/a	6.5%	—N/a	3% (Note: Márcio Fernandes (MDB) with 2.5% and Tatiana Ujacow (REDE) with 0.5%)	58.25%	5%
1 June			Adriane Lopes, the mayor of Campo Grande, joins Progressistas (PP).											
Pollster/client(s)	Date(s) conducted	Sample size	Puccinelli MDB	Modesto UNIÃO	Pereira PSDB	Lima PDT	Lopes Patriota	Contar PRTB	Zeca PT	Odilon PSD	David PL	Others	Abst. Undec.	Lead
Ranking Pesquisa	10–15 April	1,200	9.25%	8%	5.25%	6.25%	5%	3%	2.75%	2.5%	2%	4.5% (Note: Marcos Pollon (PL) with 1.75%; Carlos Alberto de Assis (PSDB) with 0.75%; Carlão (PSB) with 0.75%; Adonis Marcos (PSOL) with 0.5%; Rafael Tavares (PRTB) with 0.5% and Tatiana Ujacow (REDE) with 0.25%)	51.5%	1.25%

=== Second round ===
Beto Pereira and Adriana Lopes

Pollster/client(s)	Date(s) conducted	Sample size	Pereira PSDB	Lopes PP	Abst. Undec.	Lead
Futura/100% Cidades	6–13 June	600	36.5%	36%	27.5%	0.5%

Rose Modesto and Adriana Lopes

Pollster/client(s)	Date(s) conducted	Sample size	Modesto UNIÃO	Lopes PP	Abst. Undec.	Lead
Futura/100% Cidades	6–13 June	600	45.3%	32.8%	21.9%	12.5%

Rose Modesto and Beto Pereira

Pollster/client(s)	Date(s) conducted	Sample size	Modesto UNIÃO	Pereira PSDB	Abst. Undec.	Lead
Futura/100% Cidades	6–13 June	600	42.7%	34.6%	22.7%	8.1%

Hypothetical scenarios with Rafael Tavares

Adriane Lopes and Rafael Tavares (withdrawn)

Pollster/client(s)	Date(s) conducted	Sample size	Lopes PP	Tavares PL	Abst. Undec.	Lead
Futura/100% Cidades	6–13 June	600	43.6%	22.1%	34.4%	21.5%

André Puccinelli and Rafael Tavares (withdrawn)

Pollster/client(s)	Date(s) conducted	Sample size	Puccinelli MDB	Tavares PL	Abst. Undec.	Lead
Futura/100% Cidades	6–13 June	600	62.5%	19.1%	18.4%	43.4%

Beto Pereira and Rafael Tavares (withdrawn)

Pollster/client(s)	Date(s) conducted	Sample size	Pereira PSDB	Tavares PL	Abst. Undec.	Lead
Futura/100% Cidades	6–13 June	600	46.7%	19.3%	34%	27.4%

Rose Modesto and Rafael Tavares (withdrawn)

Pollster/client(s)	Date(s) conducted	Sample size	Modesto UNIÃO	Tavares PL	Abst. Undec.	Lead
Futura/100% Cidades	6–13 June	600	54.7%	22.9%	22.4%	31.8%

Hypothetical scenarios with André Puccinelli

Adriane Lopes and André Puccinelli (withdrawn)

Pollster/client(s)	Date(s) conducted	Sample size	Puccinelli MDB	Lopes PP	Abst. Undec.	Lead
Futura/100% Cidades	6–13 June	600	54.3%	27.2%	18.6%	27.1%

Beto Pereira and André Puccinelli (withdrawn)

Pollster/client(s)	Date(s) conducted	Sample size	Puccinelli MDB	Pereira PSDB	Abst. Undec.	Lead
Futura/100% Cidades	6–13 June	600	54.6%	27.6%	17.8%	27%

Rose Modesto and André Puccinelli (withdrawn)

Pollster/client(s)	Date(s) conducted	Sample size	Puccinelli MDB	Modesto UNIÃO	Abst. Undec.	Lead
Futura/100% Cidades	6–13 June	600	50.5%	32.7%	16.8%	17.8%

=== Rejection of candidates ===
In some opinion polls, the interviewee can choose more than one alternative (the so-called "multiple rejection"), therefore, the sum of the percentages of all candidates can exceed 100% of the votes in some scenarios.

Pollster/client(s)	Date(s) conducted	Sample size	Jara PT	Lopes PP	Pollon PL	André PRD	Martins DC	Queiroz PSOL	Figueiró NOVO	Pereira PSDB	Modesto UNIÃO	Could vote in anyone		Others	Abst. Undec.
Ranking Pesquisa	4–8 July 2024	2,000	18%	15%	9%	8%	7.6%	7.2%	6.5%	6%	4%	—N/a		—N/a	18.7%
25 June–1 July 2024			André Puccinelli (MDB) withdraws his potential candidacy for lack of political support. Marcos Pollon (PL) announces his own potential candidacy.												
Pollster/client(s)	Date(s) conducted	Sample size	Puccinelli MDB	Jara PT	Catan PL	Lopes PP	Pereira PSDB	Figueiró NOVO	André PRD	Modesto UNIÃO	Queiroz PSOL	Martins DC	Could vote in anyone	Others	Abst. Undec.
Futura/100% Cidades	6–13 June 2024	600	22.2%	24.2%	—N/a	24.6%	16.6%	13.1%	9.7%	19.7%	10.7%	17%	8.2%	16.3% (Note: Rafael Tavares (PL) with 13.9%; 2.4% of the interviewees rejects all the candidates.)	8.6%
Ranking Pesquisa	4–9 June 2024	2,000	28%	13%	4.6%	10%	3.2%	4%	5%	3%	6%	4.2%	—N/a	—N/a	19%
Ranking Pesquisa	6–11 May 2024	2,000	30%	13%	—N/a	10%	3.2%	4%	5%	3%	—N/a	4.2%	—N/a	12% (Note: Rafael Tavares (PL) with 12%)	15.6%
6–16 May 2024			Lucas de Lima (PDT), Rafael Tavares (PL) and Coronel David (PL) decide to withdraw their potential candidacies for mayor.												
Pollster/client(s)	Date(s) conducted	Sample size	Puccinelli MDB	Jara PT	Tavares PL	Lopes PP	Pereira PSDB	Figueiró NOVO	André PRD	Modesto UNIÃO	Lima PDT	David PL	Could vote in anyone	Others	Abst. Undec.
Paraná Pesquisas	19–24 April 2024	800	28.4%	17.3%	8.1%	24.6%	11.8%	—N/a	—N/a	15.5%	—N/a	—N/a	2.8%	37% (Note: Capitão Contar (PRTB) with 22.6%; Marcos Pollon (PL) with 8.1% an Jaime Verruck (PSD) with 6.3%)	10.1%
Ranking Pesquisa	2–7 April 2024	2,000	27.6%	15%	12%	7%	6%	3%	2.8%	2.6%	2%	—N/a	—N/a	—N/a	22%
12 March–5 April 2024			Rafael Tavares leaves the Brazilian Labour Renewal Party (PRTB) and joins the Liberal Party (PL); along with the announcement of his potential candidacy for mayor. Ubirajara Martins is announced as a potential candidate by the Christian Democracy (DC). Pedrossian Neto's potential candidacy is suspended by the Social Democratic Party (PSD).												
Pollster/client(s)	Date(s) conducted	Sample size	Puccinelli MDB	Contar PRTB	Zeca PT	Modesto UNIÃO	Pereira PSDB	Lopes PP	David PL	Azambuja PSDB	Pollon PL	Jara PT	Could vote in anyone	Others	Abst. Undec.
Ranking Pesquisa	4–9 March 2024	2,000	26%	—N/a	—N/a	3%	4%	6.3%	5.2%	—N/a	—N/a	12.4%	—N/a	15.1% (Note: João Henrique (PL) with 7%; Pedrossian Neto (PSD) with 4.6% and Lucas de Lima (PDT) with 3.5%)	28%
Ranking Pesquisa	26–30 January 2024	1,000	25.2%	19%	—N/a	2.2%	3%	5%	3.4%	—N/a	4.1%	7.3%	—N/a	10.8% (Note: Rafael Tavares (PRTB) with 6.2%; Pedrossian Neto (PSD) with 2.6% and Lucas de Lima (PDT) with 2%)	20%
Ranking Pesquisa	20–30 November 2023	2,000	23.8%	18.4%	—N/a	2.8%	3.5%	6.2%	3%	—N/a	4.5%	8.6%	—N/a	9.1% (Note: Pedrossian Neto (PSD) with 2.4%; Tio Trutis (PL) with 2.2%; Lucas de Lima (PDT) with 1.8%; Rodrigo Lins (PRTB) with 1.4% and Beto Figueiró (NOVO) with 1.3%)	20.1%
Ranking Pesquisa	10–16 September 2023	2,000	24.5%	13.1%	14%	3%	5.2%	7%	2.5%	—N/a	3.3%	—N/a	—N/a	10.4% (Note: Mandetta (UNIÃO) with 4.4%; Lucas de Lima (PDT) with 2.2%; Rodrigo Lins (PRTB) with 1.6%; Beto Figueiró (NOVO) with 1.2% and Pedrossian Neto (PSD) with 1%)	17%
IPEMS	18–19 July 2023	400	—N/a	—N/a	47.42%	—N/a	21.48%	37.2%	—N/a	—N/a	26.09%	—N/a	—N/a	—N/a	—N/a
Ranking Pesquisa	4–11 July 2023	1,200	25%	18.25%	11%	6%	5.5%	4.5%	3.5%	3%	2%	1.5%	—N/a	4.5% (Note: Carlão (PSB) with 1.25%; Márcio Fernandes (MDB) with 1.25%; Lucas de Lima (PDT) with 1%; Beto Figueiró (DC) with 0.5% and Tatiana Ujacow (REDE) with 0.5%)	15.25%
1 June 2023			Adriane Lopes, the mayor of Campo Grande, joins Progressistas (PP).												
Pollster/client(s)	Date(s) conducted	Sample size	Puccinelli MDB	Contar PRTB	Zeca PT	Odilon PSD	Tavares PRTB	David PL	Ujacow REDE	Modesto UNIÃO	Assis PSDB	Lopes Patriota	Could vote in anyone	Others	Abst. Undec.
Ranking Pesquisa	10–15 April 2023	1,200	25.5%	15.25%	12%	10.25%	7%	3.5%	2.75%	2.5%	2.25%	2%	—N/a	6.25% (Note: Marcos Pollon (PL) with 1.75%; Beto Pereira (PSDB) with 1.5%; Lucas de Lima (PDT) with 1.25%; Adonis Marcos (PSOL) with 1% and Carlão (PSB) with 0.75%)	10.75%

== Results ==
Candidate	Running mate	Party	First round		Second round	
Candidate	Running mate	Party	Votes	%	Votes	%
Adriane Lopes	Camilla Nascimento (Avante)	Progressistas	140,913	31.67	222,699	51.45
Rose Modesto	Roberto Oshiro	Brazil Union	131,525	29.56	210,112	48.55
Beto Pereira	Neidy Centurião (PL)	Brazilian Social Democracy Party	115,516	25.96		
Camila Jara	José Orcírio Miranda	Workers' Party	41,966	9.43		
Beto Figueiró	Cynthia Dualibi	New Party	10,885	2.45		
Luso de Queiroz	Lia Santos (REDE)	Socialism and Liberty Party	3,108	0.70		
Ubirajara Martins	João Faria	Christian Democracy	1,067	0.24		
Total			444,980	100.00	432,811	100.00
Valid votes			444,980	92.43	432,811	93.81
Invalid votes			19,451	4.04	16,871	3.66
Blank votes			16,968	3.52	11,704	2.54
Total votes			481,399	100.00	461,386	100.00
Registered voters/turnout			646,198	74.50	646,198	71.40
PP hold						

=== 1st Round ===
With a voter turnout of 74.50%, the 1st round was closely contested between the main candidates, with incumbent mayor Adriane Lopes and representative Rose Modesto advancing to the second round. Adriane Lopes was the top vote-getter in the first round, with 31.67% of the votes (140,913 votes). Rose Modesto finished second with 29.56% of the votes (131,525 votes). Beto Pereira received 25.96% of the votes (115,516 votes). Camila Jara obtained 9.43% of the votes (41,966 votes). Beto Figueiró garnered 2.45% of the votes (10,885 votes), while Ubirajara Martins had a modest showing with 0.24% of the votes (1,067 votes).

==== Statistics ====
Out of the 481,399 voters who went to the polls, 444,980 votes were valid, representing 92.43% of the total votes. Blank votes totaled 16,968 (3.52%), while null votes accounted for 19,451 (4.04%). There was significant abstention, with 25.50% of voters (164,799) choosing not to participate.

=== Results by Electoral Zones ===
Results by Electoral Zones
Electoral Zone	Candidate	Number	Party	% Votes	Votes
0008th ZE	Adriane Lopes	11	PP	32.03%	27,611
0008th ZE	Rose Modesto	44	UNIÃO	28.74%	24,771
0035th ZE	Rose Modesto	44	UNIÃO	30.80%	24,849
0035th ZE	Adriane Lopes	11	PP	30.36%	24,496
0036th ZE	Adriane Lopes	11	PP	32.04%	23,215
0036th ZE	Rose Modesto	44	UNIÃO	29.40%	21,302
0044th ZE	Adriane Lopes	11	PP	30.60%	19,683
0044th ZE	Rose Modesto	44	UNIÃO	29.65%	19,068
0053rd ZE	Adriane Lopes	11	PP	31.89%	29,945
0053rd ZE	Rose Modesto	44	UNIÃO	30.35%	28,505
0054th ZE	Adriane Lopes	11	PP	33.66%	15,963
0054th ZE	Rose Modesto	44	UNIÃO	27.48%	13,030

== City Council elected ==
Party or alliance		Votes	%	Seats	+/–
PSDB Cidadania; Federation	Brazilian Social Democracy Party	58,834	13.48	5	▲2
PSDB Cidadania; Federation	Cidadania	2,950	0.68	0	Steady
Progressistas		55,992	12.83	4	▲3
Brazil Union		39,847	9.13	3	New
Liberal Party		35,511	8.13	3	▲3
Avante		34,391	7.88	2	▲2
Brazil of Hope	Workers' Party	33,658	7.71	3	▲1
Brazil of Hope	Communist Party of Brazil	2,344	0.54	0	Steady
Brazil of Hope	Green Party	1,443	0.33	0	Steady
Brazilian Democratic Movement		30,085	6.89	2	▼1
Republicans		27,770	6.36	2	Steady
Podemos		27,307	6.25	2	▼1
Brazilian Socialist Party		23,848	5.46	1	Steady
Democratic Labour Party		22,441	5.14	1	Steady
Social Democratic Party		21,554	4.94	1	▼4
New Party		7,572	1.73	0	Steady
Solidariedade		4,310	0.99	0	▼1
Democratic Renewal Party		3,528	0.81	0	New
Christian Democracy		2,124	0.49	0	Steady
PSOL REDE; Federation	Socialism and Liberty Party	927	0.21	0	Steady
PSOL REDE; Federation	Sustainability Network	132	0.03	0	Steady
Total		436,568	100.00	29	–
Valid votes		436,568	90.69		
Invalid votes		19,771	4.11		
Blank votes		25,060	5.21		
Total votes		481,399	100.00		
Registered voters/turnout		646,198	74.50		

N°	Name	Party
1	Rafael Tavares	PL
2	Carlão Comunitário	PSB
3	Silvio Pitu	PSDB
4	Veterinário Francisco	União Brasil
5	Fabio Rocha	União Brasil
6	Professor Riverton	PP
7	Junior Coringa	MDB
8	Dr. Victor Rocha	PSDB
9	Professor Juari	PSDB
10	Flavio Cabo Almi	PSDB
11	Luiza Ribeiro	PT
12	André Salineiro	PL
13	Papy	PSDB
14	Ana Portela	PL
15	Neto Santos	Republicanos
16	Maicon Nogueira	PP
17	Delei Pinheiro	PP
18	Wilson Lands	Avante
19	Herculano Borges	Republicanos
20	Beto Avelar	PP
21	Dr. Jamal	MDB
22	Landmark	PT
23	Clodoilson Pires	Podemos
24	Jean Ferreira	PT
25	Dr. Lívio	União Brasil
26	Leinha	Avante
27	Ronilço Guerreiro	Podemos
28	Otávio Trad	PSD
29	Marquinhos Trad	PDT
