= Government of Campo Grande =

In Campo Grande, political representation is divided into executive and legislative powers. The municipal organic law governs the political and administrative organization of the municipality. As an administratively autonomous unit, subject to the Constitution of Mato Grosso do Sul and the Brazilian Constitution of 1988, it develops and implements activities that guide the city's daily life, such as the budget and the master plan.

The Executive Branch is represented by the Mayor and his Cabinet of Secretaries, following the model proposed by the Federal Constitution. Since 2017, districts have been administered by subprefectures, with their heads appointed directly by the mayor. The city hall is currently made up of ten departments: General Comptroller of Inspection and Transparency (CGM); Social Assistance Secretariat (SAS); Secretariat of Culture and Tourism (Sectur); Secretariat of Economic Development and Science and Technology (Sedesc); Department of Education (Semed); Secretariat of Finance and Planning (Sefin); Management Secretariat (Seges); Secretariat of Government and Institutional Relations (Segov); Campo Grande Municipal Youth Secretariat (Sejuv); Secretariat of Infrastructure and Public Services (Sisep); Secretariat of Environment and Urban Management (Semadur) and Secretariat of Health (Sesau). There is also a special secretariat: the Special Secretariat for Social Security and Defense (Sesde) and four sub-secretariats: Sub-Secretariat for the Defense of Human Rights (SDHU); Undersecretary of Youth Policies (Semju); Undersecretariat for Women's Policies (Semu) and Undersecretariat for Consumer Protection and Defense. In addition to the legislative process and the work of the secretariats, there are also a series of municipal councils, each of them dealing with different themes, compulsorily composed of representatives from the various sectors of organized civil society. The following municipal councils are currently active: Municipal Anti-Drug Council (Comad); of Children and Adolescents (CMDCA); of Education (CME); of the Elderly (CMI) and Health (CMS).

With a municipal population larger than states like Acre, Amapá and Roraima, it is not surprising that the Campo Grande elections are very competitive and aimed at newcomers to politics. After two decades of PMDB hegemony (with a mayor elected by the PTB during this period), the city overcame a political crisis after the break of PMDB rule. Since April 4, 2022, vice-mayor Adriane Lopes has taken over as Mayor of Campo Grande.
