= Camila Jara =

Brazilian politician

Camila Bazachi Jara Marzochi
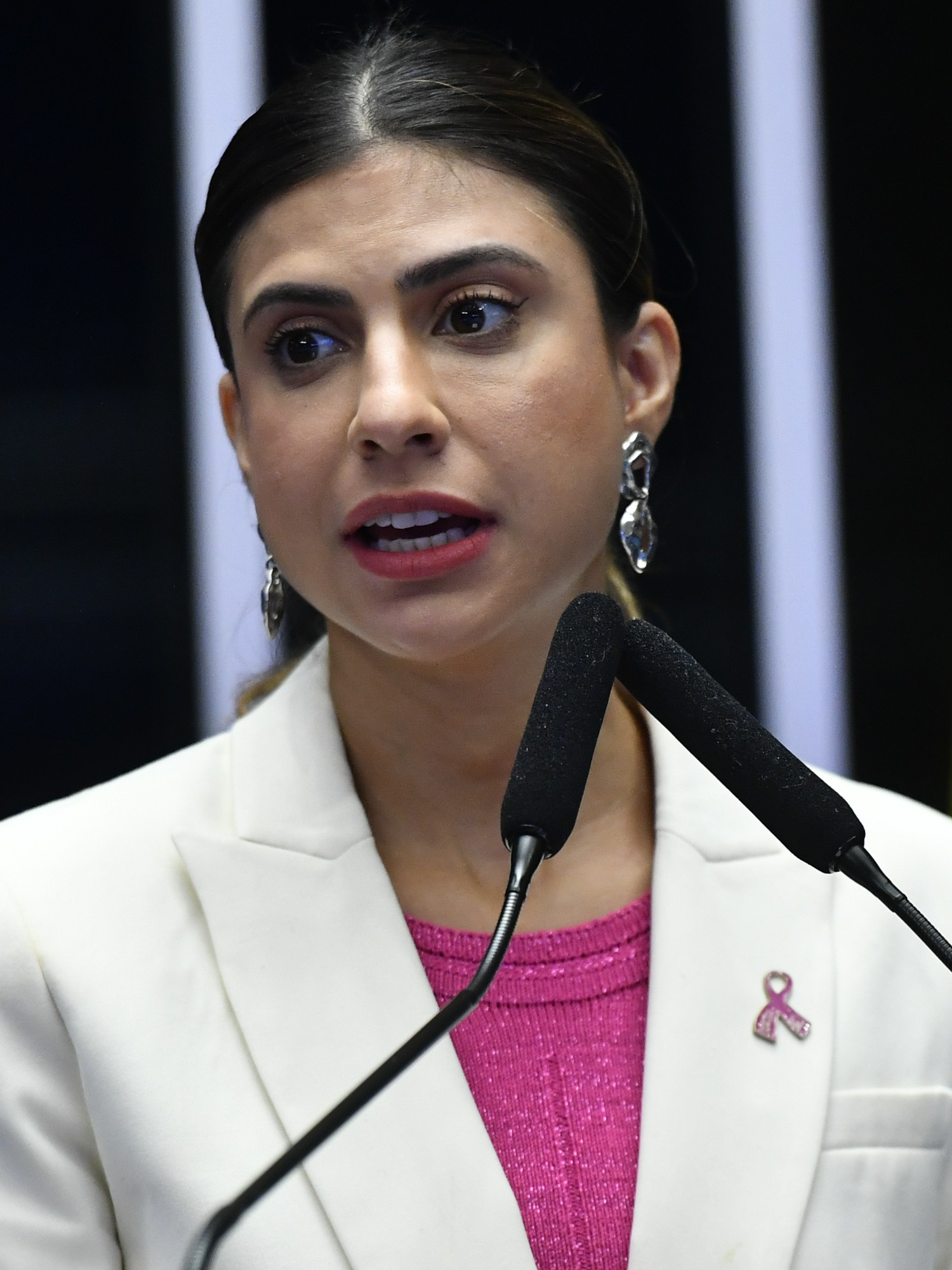
- Jara in 2023

Member of the Chamber of Deputies
- Incumbent
- Assumed office 1 February 2023
- Constituency: Mato Grosso do Sul

Member of the Municipal Chamber of Campo Grande
- In office 1 January 2021 – 1 February 2023
- Constituency: At-large

Personal details
- Born: Camila Bazachi Jara Marzochi; 10 February 1995 (age 31) Campo Grande, Mato Grosso do Sul, Brazil
- Party: PT (2014–present)
- Education: Federal University of Mato Grosso do Sul
- Profession: Social scientist

Camila Bazachi Jara Marzochi (born February 10, 1995) is a Brazilian politician affiliated with the Workers’ Party. She is a student in the last semester of Social Sciences at the Federal University councill of Mato Grosso do Sul (UFMS). She participated in political training courses by RenovaBR and is the founder of the “Coletivo Elas Podem” and a leader of the “Movimento Acredito-MS” in Campo Grande. In 2020, she was elected as the youngest councillor of Campo Grande with 3,470 votes.

As the only woman in the municipal chamber, her work focuses on defending women's issues and fighting against gender violence and discrimination against the LGBTI+ community. She was the author of the project to create a “Renda Básica Emergencial Cidadã” (Emergency Citizen Basic Income) to assist needy families in the city during the pandemic. After months of negotiation and changes in the context that demanded it, the aid provided in amendment no. 128 became part of the municipal budget approved at the end of 2021 for the fiscal years 2022–2025. Following vetoes by the executive branch, which were overturned in March 2022, the project is still awaiting implementation.

Affiliated with the Workers’ Party (PT), in the 2022 general elections, she ran for the position of federal deputy for Mato Grosso do Sul, being elected with 56,552 votes.

== Elections ==
Year	Election	Party	Office	Coalition	Partners	Party	Votes	Percent	Result
2020	Municipal Election of Campo Grande	PT	Councillor	—N/a			3,470	0.90%	Elected
2022	State Elections of Mato Grosso do Sul	PT	Federal Deputy	—N/a			56,552	4.02%	Elected
2024	Municipal Election of Campo Grande	PT	Mayor	—N/a	Zeca do PT	PT	41,966	9.43%	Not elected
2026	State Elections of Mato Grosso do Sul	PT	Federal Deputy	—N/a			154,157	10.85%	Elected
