= Lídio Lopes =

Brazilian politician

Lidio Nogueira Lopes

First Gentleman of Campo Grande
- Incumbent
- Assumed office April 2, 2022
- Preceded by: Tatiana Trad

Personal details
- Born: August 5, 1966 (age 58); Iguatemi, Mato Grosso do Sul, Brazil
- Political party: Patriota
- Spouse: Adriane Lopes
- Profession: Lawyer

Lidio Nogueira Lopes (born August 5, 1966) is a Brazilian politician and lawyer affiliated with Patriota, he is currently the first gentleman of Campo Grande and husband of Adriane Lopes, 65th mayor of Campo Grande.

In the 2022 elections in Brazil, he was elected state deputy for Mato Grosso do Sul.

== Biography ==
=== Birth and childhood ===
Born in Iguatemi in Mato Grosso do Sul, as one of the sons of João Francisco Lopes and Lenira Amélia Nogueira Lopes and has seven brothers and four sisters.

At the age of nine he began working as a shoeshine boy, then in restaurants and later at the Iguatemi Telephone Post, where he went to study.

=== Professional career ===
He is a member of the Assembly of the Evangelical Church of the Missions of God, served as President of Umadecamp (Assemblies of God Youth Union in Campo Grande) and president of Umadems (Assemblies of God Youth Union in Mato Grosso do Sul State)

He is a lawyer, an effective employee of the TCE/MS (Court of Accounts of Mato Grosso do Sul) since 1994.

=== Political career ===
In 2008, he ran for one of the 21 councilor seats in the city of Campo Grande and was elected with almost 7,000 votes. He held the position of vice-president, he was president of the special commission for the revision of the organic law of the municipality of Campo Grande and the internal regulations, as well as member of the CCJ (Constitution and Justice Commission and Final Drafting) and vice-president of the Permanent Commission on Transport and Transit.

He has been a state deputy for Mato Grosso do Sul since 2018.
