= Nelson Trad Sr. =

Brazilian politician (1930–2011)

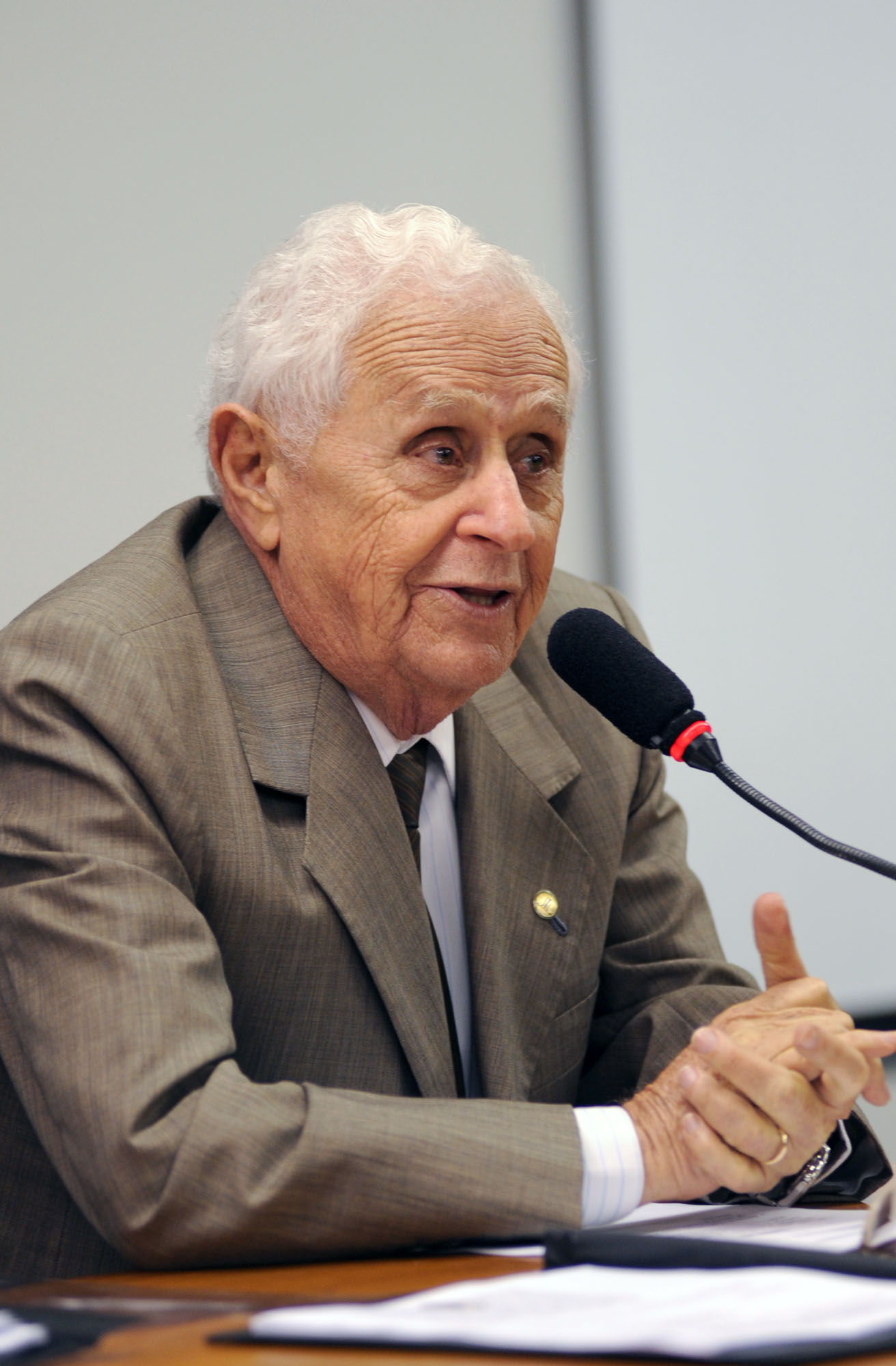
Nelson in 2009

Nelson Trad Sr. (30 October 1930 – 7 December 2011) was a Brazilian lawyer and politician, held the position of federal deputy elected by of Mato Grosso do Sul.

Son of Assaf Trad and Margarida Maksoud, Lebanese immigrants. He married Therezinha Mandetta and had five children: Fátima, Maria Thereza, Marquinhos, Fábio and Nelsinho, the last three of whom were also politicians. He was the father of Nelson Trad Jr., re-elected mayor of Campo Grande and Marquinhos Trad, former councilor and federal deputy, currently mayor of Campo Grande for the PSD, and Fábio Trad, currently federal deputy.

He studied law at the University of Rio de Janeiro (UERJ) between 1953 and 1957. He was president of the Penitentiary Council of the State of Mato Grosso do Sul and of the Court of Sports Justice of the Football Federation.

== Biography ==
In 2006, he was rapporteur in the process of the ethics council of the Chamber and recommended the impeachment of deputy Roberto Brant (PFL-MG).

As a legal representative of the company "O Bisturi- Equipamentos Médico-Hospitalares Ltda." he was condemned for billing materials that had not been delivered to the National Institute of Medical Assistance and Social Security. In addition to the debt payment, the company had its accounts judged to be irregular.

Nelson was the target of a popular action that questions the payment, by the extinct State Pension Fund of the Parliament of Mato Grosso do Sul, of pensions to fourteen people, who received, simultaneously, the benefit and the salary.

Voted for the recreation of the Provisional Contribution on Financial Transactions - CPMF, with the name Social Contribution to Health - CSS. On that occasion, by just three votes, the tax that was initially provisional was maintained.

Voted against the CPI's suspension of the 2007 air blackout.

Voted for the end of secret voting in the legislature.
