= Tarabai (disambiguation) =

Tarabai (1675-1761), was the regent of the Maratha Empire of India.

Tarabai may also refer to:

- Tarabai, São Paulo, municipality in São Paulo, Brazil
- Tarabai Shinde (1850-1910), Indian feminist activist
- Tarabai Modak (1892-1973), Indian social worker
- Tarabai Vartak (1926-2008), Indian politician
- Tarabai (footballer) (born 1985), Edison Luiz dos Santos, Brazilian footballer
- Tara Bai, fictional character portrayed by Shammi in the Indian film Agneepath (1990)
