= Adriane Lopes =

Brazilian right-wing politician and mayor of Campo Grande

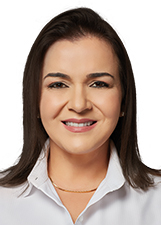
- Lopes in 2024

65th Mayor of Campo Grande
- Incumbent
- Assumed office 4 April 2022
- Deputy: Camilla Nascimento (since 2025)
- Preceded by: Marcos Marcello Trad

Vice Mayor of Campo Grande
- In office 1 January 2017 – 4 April 2022
- Preceded by: Gilmar Olarte

Personal details
- Born: Adriane Barbosa Nogueira; 29 June 1976 (age 50) Grandes Rios, Paraná, Brazil
- Party: Progressistas (since 2023)
- Other political affiliations: Patriota (until 2023)
- Spouse: Lídio Lopes
- Children: 2
- Education: Law and theology
- Occupation: Politician; Lawyer
- Website: www.campogrande.ms.gov.br

Adriane Barbosa Nogueira Lopes (born 29 June 1976) is a Brazilian right-wing politician and lawyer who has served as the 65th Mayor of Campo Grande, the capital of Mato Grosso do Sul, since April 2022. A member of the conservative Progressistas (PP), she is associated with Brazilian conservatism and evangelical political movements. She became the first woman to hold the city's mayoralty in 2022 and the first woman elected to the office in 2024.

Lopes served as vice-mayor under Marcos Marcello Trad from 2017 until April 2022, when she succeeded him following his resignation to contest the Mato Grosso do Sul gubernatorial election. She was subsequently elected to a full four-year term in October 2024, defeating Rose Modesto with 51.45% of the valid votes. Her campaign received the support of former president Jair Bolsonaro and Governor Eduardo Riedel.

Her administration has faced substantial public disapproval. A December 2025 nationwide survey by AtlasIntel, as reported by regional media, placed Lopes among the most negatively evaluated mayors of Brazilian state capitals. A separate survey by Ranking Brasil Inteligência in July 2026 reported that 94% of respondents disapproved of her administration, while 3% approved.

Lopes and her vice-mayor have also been involved in electoral litigation concerning allegations of vote-buying during the 2024 election. In June 2025, federal electoral prosecutors appealed a decision that had dismissed an electoral investigation against them. Lopes has denied wrongdoing in connection with a separate federal police investigation reported in June 2026.

== Early life and education ==
Adriane Barbosa Nogueira was born on 29 June 1976 in Grandes Rios, Paraná, the daughter of Antônio Ferreira Barbosa and Gisleni Garcia Barbosa.

She moved with her family to Campo Grande at the age of nine. Before entering politics, she studied law and theology and worked in public security and social projects.

She later completed postgraduate studies in public administration and municipal management. Her public activities have included involvement in religious and social assistance organisations.

== Political career ==
=== Vice-mayor of Campo Grande (2017–2022) ===
Lopes was elected vice-mayor of Campo Grande in 2016 as the running mate of Marcos Marcello Trad, commonly known as Marquinhos Trad. They took office on 1 January 2017.

The pair won re-election in the 2020 municipal election, allowing Lopes to serve a second consecutive term as vice-mayor.

On 4 April 2022, Lopes became mayor following Trad's resignation to run for governor of Mato Grosso do Sul. She became the first woman to occupy the office of mayor of Campo Grande.

=== Mayor of Campo Grande (2022–present) ===
Following her accession to the mayoralty, Lopes initially continued several policies and administrative programmes inherited from Trad.

Her administration has addressed municipal infrastructure, healthcare, education, public transportation, housing and administrative reform.

During her first period as mayor, she faced criticism over shortages of medicines in municipal health units and delays in public services.

In 2024, her re-election campaign proposed reducing bureaucracy, increasing access to municipal education and expanding infrastructure investment.

=== 2024 mayoral election ===
Lopes contested the 2024 municipal election as a member of Progressistas (PP), having left Patriota in 2023.

In the first round on 6 October 2024, she received 140,913 votes (31.67%), advancing to a runoff against Rose Modesto, who received 131,525 votes (29.56%).

The runoff took place on 27 October. Lopes won 222,699 votes (51.45%), defeating Modesto, who received 210,112 votes (48.55%). Campo Grande was the only Brazilian state capital with two women contesting the second round that year.

Her candidacy received support from former president Jair Bolsonaro, Senator Tereza Cristina and Governor Eduardo Riedel. The campaign emphasised conservative values and appeals to evangelical voters.

=== Second term (2025–present) ===
Lopes was sworn in for the 2025–2028 term on 1 January 2025 at the Rubens Gil de Camillo Convention Centre in Campo Grande. Her running mate, Camilla Nascimento, assumed the office of vice-mayor.

Her stated priorities for the term included municipal public transportation, completing unfinished infrastructure projects and improving public services.

The administration has faced continuing criticism regarding healthcare services, road maintenance, public transportation and municipal finances.

== Political positions ==
Lopes is associated with conservative and right-wing politics in Brazil. She is a member of Progressistas and received support from former president Jair Bolsonaro in the 2024 election.

Her political positions have included an emphasis on religion, family values and conservative social policies.

She has publicly identified as an evangelical Christian and has participated in religious community activities. Her religious affiliation was a prominent aspect of her public image during the 2024 election campaign.

== Public approval and criticism ==
=== Approval ratings ===
Public opinion surveys have indicated high levels of dissatisfaction with Lopes's administration, particularly during her second term.

In December 2025, a national AtlasIntel survey, according to reporting by Pix News MS, placed Lopes at the bottom of a comparison of mayoral approval in Brazilian state capitals, with 79% disapproval.

A survey conducted by Ranking Brasil Inteligência between 16 and 20 March 2026 interviewed 1,000 eligible respondents and reported 90% disapproval of Lopes's administration and 7% approval. In the same survey, 80% rated her administration as poor or very poor.

Another survey by the same institute, conducted between 17 and 21 July 2026 with 1,000 respondents, reported that 94% disapproved of the administration, 3% approved, and 3% did not answer. The survey had a stated margin of error of 3.1 percentage points.

The July survey also found that 85% of respondents rated the administration as poor or very poor, while 2% considered it good or very good. Healthcare, road maintenance and municipal administration were among the principal concerns identified by respondents.

=== Historical comparisons ===
In August 2025, Ranking Brasil Inteligência conducted a survey asking respondents to identify the worst mayor in Campo Grande's history.

According to the institute, 40% named Lopes, followed by Alcides Bernal with 26% and Gilmar Olarte with 22%. The poll was commissioned by the Top FM radio network and surveyed 1,000 respondents between 10 and 15 August 2025.

The results reflected respondents' opinions rather than an objective historical assessment of the city's administrations.

== Electoral investigations and legal proceedings ==
=== Allegations concerning the 2024 election ===
Lopes's 2024 re-election campaign became the subject of electoral litigation over allegations of illegal vote-buying.

In June 2025, the Regional Electoral Prosecutor's Office of Mato Grosso do Sul filed a special electoral appeal against a ruling by the Regional Electoral Court that had dismissed an electoral investigation concerning Lopes and Vice-Mayor Camilla Nascimento.

The prosecutors sought the annulment of the elected officials' mandates and a declaration of electoral ineligibility, arguing that the court's decision was inconsistent with Brazilian electoral legislation and judicial precedent.

The dismissal of the original action was not a criminal conviction, and the prosecution's appeal did not itself establish the allegations as proven.

=== Federal Police investigation in 2026 ===
On 19 June 2026, reports described Federal Police operations connected with allegations of vote-buying during the 2024 municipal elections.

The investigation, known as Operation Suffragium, examined suspected irregularities involving financial transfers and electoral activities associated with individuals linked to the campaign.

Lopes stated that the investigation did not involve municipal government agencies or acts carried out by the incumbent administration. She said that she had received news of the operation with surprise and calm.

As of the reporting cited, the allegations were under investigation and did not establish personal criminal responsibility.

== Personal life ==
Lopes is married to Lídio Lopes, a politician who has served in the Legislative Assembly of Mato Grosso do Sul. They have two children, Matheus and Bruno.

== Electoral history ==
Election	Office	Round	Votes	Percentage	Result
2016	Vice-mayor	Second	241,876	58.77%	Elected
2020	Vice-mayor	First	218,418	52.58%	Re-elected
2024	Mayor	First	140,913	31.67%	Runoff
2024	Mayor	Second	222,699	51.45%	Elected

== See also ==
- Mayor of Campo Grande
- 2024 Campo Grande mayoral election
- Politics of Mato Grosso do Sul
- List of mayors of Brazilian state capitals
