= João Henrique =

João Henrique is a given name. Notable people with the name include:

- Andrade (footballer, born 1981) (born 1981), Brazilian footballer
- João Tomás (born 1975), Portuguese footballer
- João Henrique (footballer, born 1987), João Henrique da Silva, Brazilian football forward
- João Henrique (composer), Portuguese score composer
- João Henrique (politician) (born 1988), Brazilian politician
