= Marcos Marcello Trad =

Brazilian politician

Marquinhos Trad
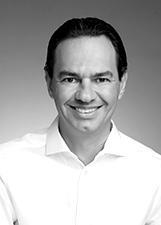
- Marcos in 2016

Mayor of Campo Grande
- In office January 1, 2017 – April 2, 2022
- Preceded by: Alcides Bernal
- Succeeded by: Adriane Lopes

State deputy of Mato Grosso do Sul
- In office February 1, 2007 – December 31, 2016

Councillor of Campo Grande
- In office February 1, 2005 – January 31, 2007

Municipal Secretary of Land Affairs of Campo Grande
- In office 1996–2000
- Preceded by: Carlos Marun
- Succeeded by: —

Personal details
- Born: Marcos Marcello Trad; 28 August 1964 (age 62) Campo Grande, Mato Grosso do Sul, Brazil
- Party: PMDB (2004–2016); PSD (2016–2024); PDT (2024–present)
- Parents: Nelson Trad Sr. (father); Therezinha Mandetta (mother)
- Relatives: Fábio Trad (brother); Nelson Trad Filho (brother)
- Education: Federal University of Rio de Janeiro
- Profession: Lawyer

Marcos Marcello Trad (born August 28, 1964) is a Brazilian lawyer and politician who served as the 64th Mayor of Campo Grande, Brazil from 2017 until his resignation from office in 2022.

Prior to this, he was a city councilor for Campo Grande from 2005 to 2007 and a state deputy for Mato Grosso do Sul from 2007 to 2016, serving three consecutive terms. Born in Campo Grande, Mato Grosso do Sul, to Nelson Trad and Therezinha Mandetta Trad. He is married to Tatiana Trad and has four daughters: Andressa, Aline, Mariana, and Alice. He is also the grandfather of Lara and Isabele. A lawyer by profession, he graduated from the Federal University of Rio de Janeiro (UFRJ). His political career began when he was elected as a city councilor in 2004. He served as the Municipal Secretary of Land Affairs before being elected as a state deputy in 2006, a position he held until 2016. In 2016, he was elected Mayor of Campo Grande with 241,876 votes. As a lawyer, he was a member of the Mato Grosso do Sul section of the Brazilian Bar Association, serving as a counselor and later presiding over the Ethics and Discipline Commission. He also chaired the State Sports Justice Tribunal (TJD-MS).

== Political career ==
Trad's political journey began when he was elected city councilor in 2004. He then served as the Municipal Secretary of Land Affairs under Mayor André Puccinelli. He was elected as a state deputy for the first time in 2006 and re-elected in 2010 and 2014. Initially affiliated with the Brazilian Democratic Movement (PMDB), he joined the Social Democratic Party (PSD) in 2016.

In the 2016 mayoral race, Trad ran for the office of Mayor of Campo Grande under the PSD banner. He advanced to the second round with 34.57% of the votes and won the election with 58.77% of the votes. He left office in 2022 to run for Governor of Mato Grosso do Sul. During his tenure, he elevated the Subsecretariat of Youth to the Municipal Secretariat of Youth (SEJUV).

== Controversies ==
=== 2010: "Impossible to Live on R$ 11,000" ===
In December 2010, Trad stirred controversy by stating during a legislative session that it was "impossible to live on R$ 11,000," referring to his monthly salary which had recently been increased to R$12,300.

=== 2016: Unpaid loan ===
In April 2016, it was revealed that Trad had obtained a R$1.2 million loan from the newspaper "Correio do Estado" during his 2014 re-election campaign. The loan was neither declared to the Regional Electoral Court of Mato Grosso do Sul (TRE-MS) nor repaid.

=== 2016: Audio leak ===
In September 2016, "Veja" magazine published excerpts from phone taps related to Operation Coffee Break, which investigated a scheme to impeach Mayor Alcides Bernal. In the recordings, councilor Flávio César (PSDB) asked former mayor Nelson Trad Filho to involve Marquinhos in garnering votes for the impeachment. Trad denied any involvement, stating he was unaware of the audio.

=== 2016: TRE/MS fine ===
In September 2016, businessman Arnaldo Britto de Moura Júnior claimed in a Federal Police deposition that he raised R$200,000 in undeclared funds for Trad's 2014 campaign, leading to a fine by TRE-MS. Trad denied the allegations, stating that Moura Júnior was merely a campaign donor.

=== 2016: Deception allegation ===
Later in September 2016, a social institution employee accused Trad of deception, claiming she was misled into attending a work meeting that was actually a campaign event. Trad denied the accusation, attributing it to political opponents.

=== 2022: Sexual assault allegations ===
In November 2022, Trad was accused of sexual crimes by seven women.

== Candidacy for the governorship of Mato Grosso do Sul ==
In January 2022, Trad announced his candidacy for the governorship of Mato Grosso do Sul in the 2022 state elections. However, he lost the election on October 2, 2022.

== Personal life ==
Trad is the son of former federal deputy Nelson Trad Sr. and Therezinha Mandetta. He is the brother of former Campo Grande Mayor Nelson Trad Filho and former federal deputy Fábio Trad. He graduated in law from the Federal University of Rio de Janeiro (UFRJ). He married Tatiana Trad in December 2002, and they have two daughters, Mariana and Alice.
