= Beto Pereira =

Brazilian politician

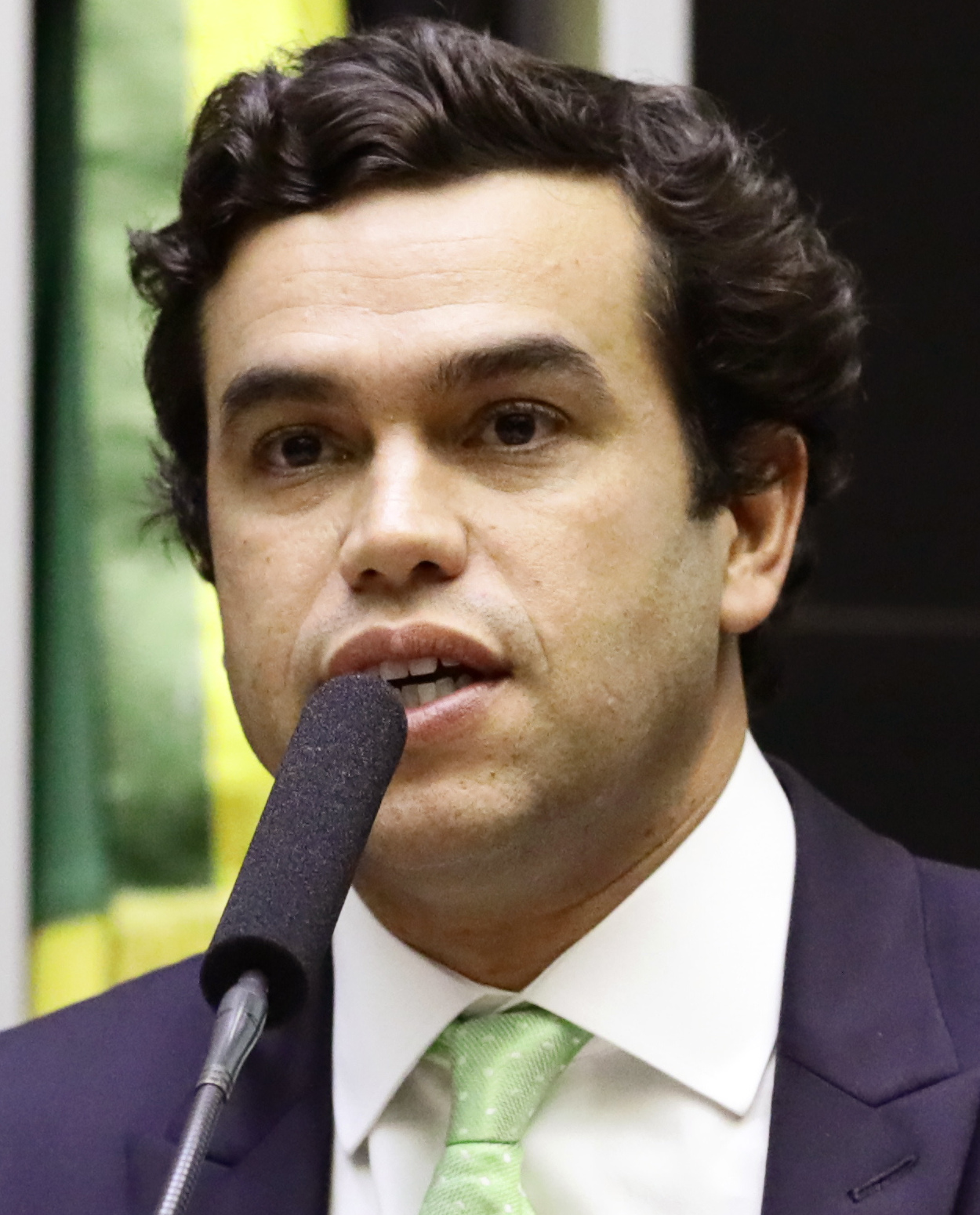

Federal Deputy for Mato Grosso do Sul
- Incumbent
- Assumed office February 1, 2019

State deputy of Mato Grosso do Sul
- In office February 1, 2015 – February 1, 2019

Mayor of Terenos
- In office January 1, 2005 – January 1, 2013
- Preceded by: Alonso Honostorio de Rezende
- Succeeded by: Professora Carla

Personal details
- Born: November 14, 1977 (age 48) Campo Grande, Mato Grosso do Sul, Brazil
- Party: Brazilian Democratic Movement (1999-2009); Brazilian Social Democracy Party (2009-2013); Democratic Labor Party (2013-2016); Brazilian Social Democracy Party (2016-present)
- Profession: Businessman; Politician

Humberto Rezende Pereira (born November 14, 1977), better known as Beto Pereira, is a Brazilian businessman and politician. He is currently serving his second term as a Federal Deputy for Mato Grosso do Sul. He has previously served as the Mayor of Terenos and as a State Deputy of Mato Grosso do Sul.

== Biography ==
Beto Pereira was born in Campo Grande, Mato Grosso do Sul. He entered politics at a young age and was elected Mayor of Terenos at the age of 26, becoming the youngest mayor in the state at the time. During his tenure, he implemented significant infrastructure projects, including the construction of houses, schools in rural areas, and the city's first full-time school.

He later served as the president of the Assomasul (Association of Municipalities of Mato Grosso do Sul) and became the vice-president of the National Confederation of Municipalities. As a State Deputy, he chaired the Commission of Constitution, Justice, and Drafting and was involved in various legislative initiatives aimed at improving the state's infrastructure and public services.

In 2018, Pereira was elected as a Federal Deputy with 80,500 votes. He has been an advocate for economic, sustainability, and social integration in Mato Grosso do Sul and has allocated significant funds for development projects across all municipalities in the state.

In 2022, he was re-elected federal deputy with 97,872 votes in Mato Grosso do Sul. In February 2023, he was elected to join the board of directors of the Chamber of Deputies. In 2024, he is running for Mayor of Campo Grande in that year's elections.
