= LGBTQ rights in Mato Grosso do Sul =

- Legal status: Legal since 1830, age of consent equalised
- Gender identity: Gender change allowed, official standard for altering legal sex doesn't require surgery since 2018
- Military: Allowed to serve openly
- Discrimination protections: Yes, since 1989 for sexual orientation and since 2019 for gender identity

Family rights
- Recognition of relationships: Same-sex marriage since 2011
- Adoption: Legal since 2010

Lesbian, gay, bisexual, transgender and queer (LGBTQ) people in the Brazilian state of Mato Grosso do Sul enjoy many of the same legal protections available to non-LGBTQ people. Homosexuality is legal in the state.

== Laws against discrimination ==
Mato Grosso do Sul was among the first states in Brazil to enact a state constitution banning discrimination on the basis of sexual orientation, doing so in 1989 alongside the state of Sergipe.

== Recognition of same-sex unions ==
On 2 April 2013, the Court of Mato Grosso do Sul authorizes marriage between same-sex couples in the state.

== Gender identity and expression ==
On 23 September 2025, the Campo Grande City Council approved, by a vote of 19–6, a bill to prohibit trans people from participating in sports in accordance with their gender identity, with fines of up to 48,000 reais. On 15 October 2025, Mayor Adriane Lopes, of the Progressistas party, vetoed the bill. On 27 October 2025, the veto was overridden by the City Council, and the bill was enacted into law. On 20 October 2026, the Court of Justice of Mato Grosso do Sul denied a request by the Associação das Travestis e Transexuais de Mato Grosso do Sul to strike down the law.

In March 2026, the Campo Grande City Council approved, by a vote of 13–11, a bill prohibiting transgender women from using women's public restrooms. On April 22, Mayor Adriane Lopes signed the bill into law. Lopes stated that the law would be to "respect women's rights." On 28 March, the law was reported to the Public Prosecutor's Office of Mato Grosso do Sul. On 29 April, the Public Defender's Office of Mato Grosso do Sul opened an investigation to examine the city's law. On 5 May, Congresswoman Erika Hilton denounced the law to the Brazilian Federal Prosecution Office.

On 18 July 2026, the Public Defender's Office of Mato Grosso do Sul announced that non-binary people could change their documents to reflect their gender identity through court decisions.

== Education ==
On 21 July 1995, Mato Grosso do Sul passed a law making the subject of "sexual orientation" mandatory for 5th and 6th grade students in state schools.

On 8 December 2021, the Legislative Assembly of Mato Grosso do Sul approved a bill prohibiting the teaching of gender-neutral language in schools. The state governor, Reinaldo Azambuja (PSDB), signed the bill into law on 30 December.

In 2023, Supreme Federal Court (STF) revoked several bills, and suspended the MS law that forbidding gender-neutral neologisms in state schools. In 2024, STF kept the suspensions, and expanded the vetos from 2025 to 2026.

== Summary table ==
Same-sex sexual activity legal	Yes (Since 1830)
Equal age of consent	Yes (Since 1830)
Anti-discrimination laws in employment only	Yes (Since 1989 for sexual orientation; Since 2019 for gender identity)
Anti-discrimination laws in the provision of goods and services	Yes (Since 1989 for sexual orientation; Since 2019 for gender identity)
Anti-discrimination laws in all other areas (Incl. indirect discrimination, hate speech)	Yes (Since 1989 for sexual orientation; Since 2019 for gender identity)
LGBTQ anti-bullying law in public and private schools	Yes / No (Teaching gender-neutral language has been banned since 2021)
Transgender people allowed to use restrooms and other gender-segregated spaces that correspond with their gender identity	Yes / No (Banned in Campo Grande since 2026)
Transgender athletes allowed to participate in single-sex sports	Yes / No (Banned in Campo Grande since 2026)
Same-sex marriages	Yes (Since 2013)
Recognition of same-sex couples	Yes (Since 2011)
Stepchild adoption by same-sex couples	Yes (Officially permitted since 2010)
Joint adoption by same-sex couples	Yes (Officially permitted since 2010)
LGBTQ people allowed to serve openly in the military	Yes
Right to change legal gender	Yes (Since 2008; gender self-identification since 2018)
Third gender option	Yes (Since 2026 through a court decision)
Conversion therapy by medical professionals banned	Yes (Since 1999 for homosexuals and since 2018 for transgender people)
Access to IVF for lesbians	Yes (Since 2013)
Commercial surrogacy for gay male couples	No (Banned for any couple regardless of sexual orientation)
MSMs allowed to donate blood	Yes (Since 2020)
