= Alcides Bernal =

Brazilian politician (1965–2026)

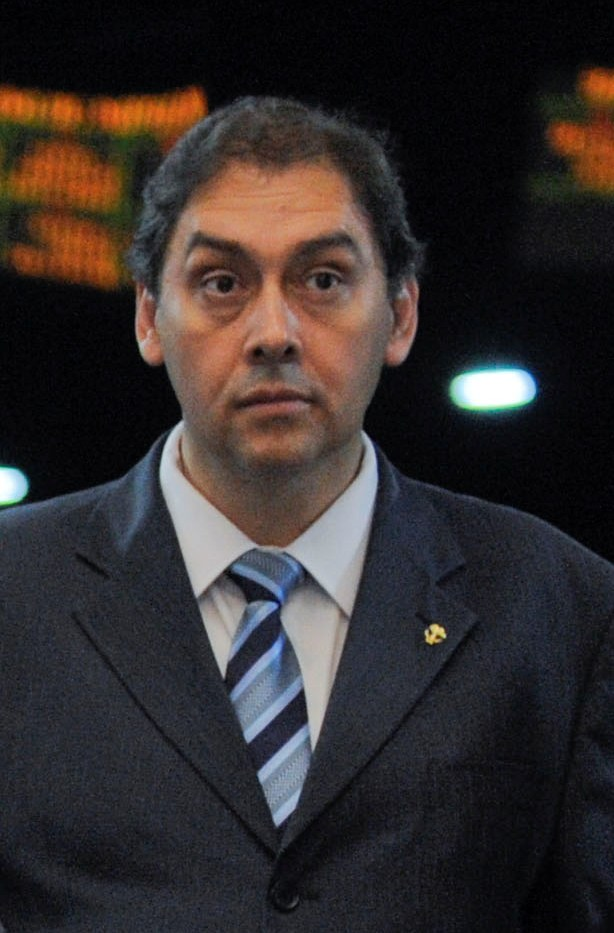

62nd Mayor of Campo Grande
- In office January 1, 2013 – March 12, 2014
- Preceded by: Nelsinho Trad
- Succeeded by: Gilmar Olarte

Mayor of Campo Grande (reinstated)
- In office August 25, 2015 – December 31, 2016
- Preceded by: Gilmar Olarte
- Succeeded by: Marcos Marcello Trad

Personal details
- Born: Alcides Jesus Peralta Bernal; July 14, 1965 Corumbá, Mato Grosso do Sul, Brazil
- Died: July 13, 2026 (aged 60)
- Party: Progressistas (PP)
- Spouse: Mirian Elzi Gonçalves
- Profession: Lawyer, radio broadcaster, politician

Alcides Jesus Peralta Bernal (July 14, 1965 – July 13, 2026) was a Brazilian lawyer, radio broadcaster and politician who served as the 62nd Mayor of Campo Grande, the capital of the state of Mato Grosso do Sul. His political career was marked by controversy, including impeachment proceedings and legal battles.

== Early life ==
Alcides Bernal was born in Corumbá, Mato Grosso do Sul on July 14, 1965. He held a law degree from the Universidade Católica Dom Bosco (UCDB). Prior to entering politics, Bernal gained prominence as a radio broadcaster in the state, working for Rede MS, where he hosted the programs "Refazenda" and "Cruzando Fronteiras".

== Political career ==
=== City council and State legislature ===
Bernal began his political career as a city councilor in Campo Grande, serving two terms. In 2010, he was elected as a state deputy for Mato Grosso do Sul, representing the region in the state legislature.

=== Mayor of Campo Grande ===
In 2012, Bernal launched his campaign for mayor of Campo Grande, running as a member of the Progressive Party (PP). He won the election in the second round with 62.55% of the vote, defeating Edson Giroto of the PMDB, and took office on January 1, 2013. His victory was seen as a major upset, as Campo Grande had been governed by the PMDB for over two decades.

=== Impeachment ===
Bernal's time in office was tumultuous. In March 2014, he was impeached by the Campo Grande city council over allegations of administrative misconduct. The council cited nine instances of alleged political and administrative wrongdoing. His vice mayor, Gilmar Olarte, assumed the office following Bernal's impeachment.

However, Bernal fought back in court and, in August 2015, was reinstated as mayor by a judicial ruling from the Mato Grosso do Sul Court of Justice. His return to office was seen as a dramatic turn in the city's political landscape. He completed the remainder of his term but did not secure reelection in 2016.

=== 2016 Mayoral Election ===
Bernal sought reelection in the 2016 mayoral race but failed to advance to the second round, finishing just outside the cutoff by a narrow margin of 2,630 votes. He subsequently endorsed Marquinhos Trad, who went on to win the election.

== Controversies ==
In his political career, in 2012, during his mayoral campaign, a video uploaded to YouTube falsely accused him of promoting abortion and committing other serious offenses, leading to the arrest of Google's Brazil director after the company refused to remove the content. Additionally, Bernal faced accusations regarding an alleged improper loan made to a taxi cooperative and legal issues over unpaid child support.

== Personal life and death ==
Alcides Bernal was married to Mirian Elzi Gonçalves. In addition to his political career, he continued to be involved in legal work and media broadcasting.

Bernal died on July 13, 2026, at the age of 60.
