= Gilmar Olarte =

Brazilian politician (born 1970)

Gilmar Antunes Olarte
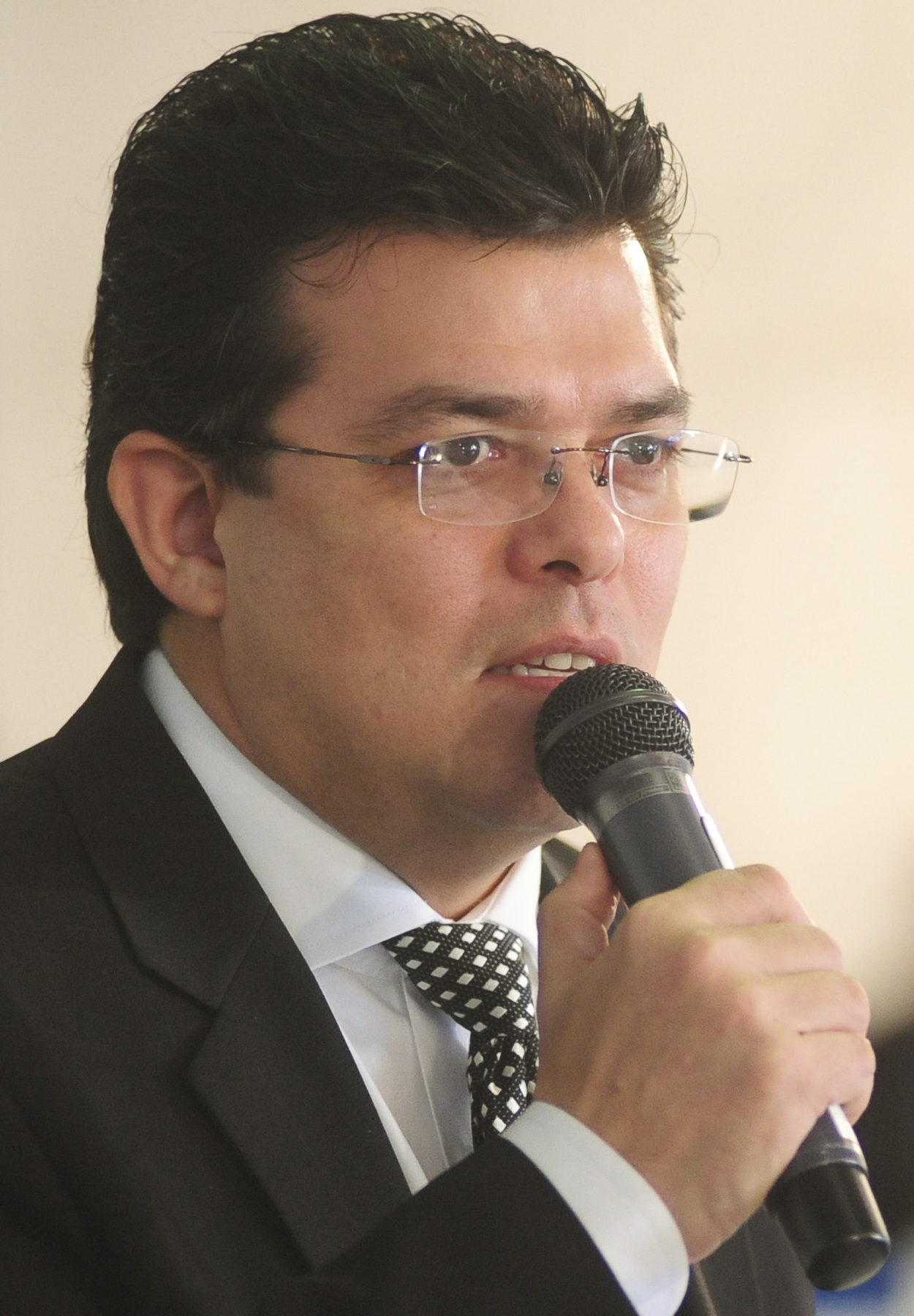
- Olarte in 2015

Mayor of Campo Grande
- In office March 13, 2014 – August 25, 2015
- Preceded by: Alcides Bernal
- Succeeded by: Alcides Bernal

Vice-Mayor of Campo Grande
- In office January 1, 2013 – March 12, 2014
- Preceded by: Edil Albuquerque
- Succeeded by: Adriane Lopes

Personal details
- Born: May 30, 1970 (age 55) Aquidauana, Mato Grosso do Sul, Brazil
- Party: União Brasil (2024–present)
- Other political affiliations: PMN (2000–2003); PSC (2003–2006); PP (2006–2015); PROS (2016–2023); Solidariedade (2023–2024)
- Spouse: Andréia Nunes Zanelato Olarte
- Profession: Accountant, businessman, radio host, evangelical pastor

Gilmar Antunes Olarte (born May 30, 1970) is a Brazilian businessman, politician, and Evengelical Christian pastor who served as 63rd mayor of Campo Grande after the impeachment of Alcides Bernal but was removed from office after a judicial order.

His political career includes affiliations with several parties: PMN (2000–2003), PSC (2003–2006), PP (2006–2015), PROS (2016–2023), Solidariedade (2023–2024), and União Brasil (2024–present). He was also a city councilor for Campo Grande on two occasions, serving as a substitute.

Olarte is also a founding member of the Igreja Assembleia de Deus Nova Aliança. Olarte's mayoral term was marred by accusations and legal troubles. He assumed office after the impeachment of Alcides Bernal, but on August 25, 2015, he was removed from office following an investigation by the Special Action Group for Combatting Organized Crime (Gaeco). Olarte and several businessmen were accused of bribing council members to support Bernal's impeachment. In May 2015, it was revealed that Gaeco was investigating him for the so-called "blank check scheme," in which he allegedly obtained blank checks from voters in exchange for promises of public office and government contracts.

In August 2016, Olarte was arrested during the second phase of Operation ADNA, dubbed "Pecúnia." He later resigned from office on September 8, 2016. Olarte is married to Andréia Nunes Zanelato Olarte. He has a background in business and radio hosting, alongside his work as an evangelical pastor.
