= Therezinha Mandetta Trad =

Brazilian educator

Second lady of Campo Grande
- In office January 31, 1963 – April 9, 1964

Personal details
- Born: February 12, 1937 Campo Grande, Brazil
- Died: February 22, 2023 (aged 86) Campo Grande, Brazil
- Spouse: Nelson Trad Sr.
- Children: 5, including Marquinhos, Fábio, and Nelsinho
- Occupation: Educator
- Known for: Matriarch of the Trad family

Therezinha Mandetta Trad (12 February 1937 – 22 February 2023) was a Brazilian educator and the matriarch of the prominent Trad family. She was married to former federal deputy Nelson Trad Sr., with whom she had five children, including Mayor Marcos Marcello Trad; former federal deputy Fábio Trad; and Senator Nelsinho Trad.

== Early life and education ==
Therezinha Mandetta was born in the late 1930s. She began her professional career as a normalist in the 1950s, teaching at Colégio Auxiliadora.

== Career ==
Dedicated to education, Therezinha was a respected teacher who contributed significantly to her community. In 1979, she furthered her commitment to education by graduating in Pedagogy from FUCMT.

== Personal life ==
She was the mother of five children: Fátima, Maria Thereza, Marquinhos, Fábio, and Nelsinho. She also had 19 grandchildren and 10 great-grandchildren. Her family has been actively involved in Brazilian politics and public service.

== Death ==
Therezinha Mandetta Trad died at the age of 86 due to a cerebral aneurysm in Campo Grande.

== Legacy ==
In recognition of her contributions to education, a law authored by her grandson, councilman Otávio Trad, led to the reinauguration of the EMEI Professora Therezinha Mandetta Trad.
