= Fábio Trad =

Brazilian politician (born 1969)

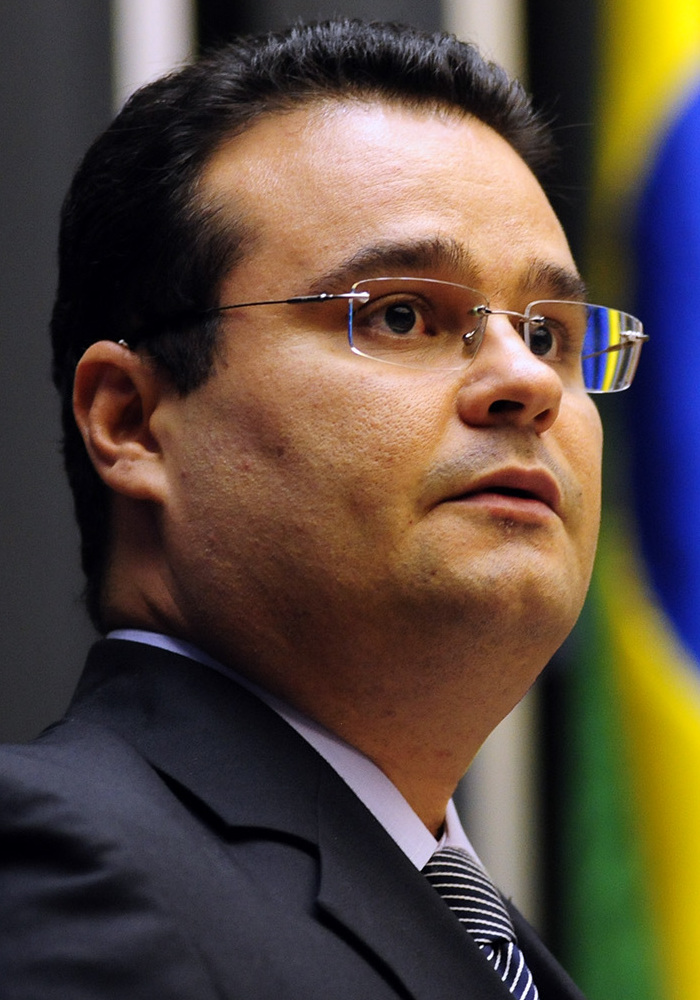
- Trad in 2013

Member of the Chamber of Deputies
- In office 1 February 2011 – 31 January 2023
- Constituency: Mato Grosso do Sul

Personal details
- Born: 18 August 1969 (age 57)
- Party: Social Democratic Party (since 2016)
- Parents: Nelson Trad Sr. (father); Therezinha Mandetta Trad (mother)
- Relatives: Nelson Trad Filho (brother); Marcos Marcello Trad (brother)

Fábio Ricardo Trad (born 18 August 1969) is a Brazilian politician. From 2011 to 2023, he was a member of the Chamber of Deputies. He is the son of Nelson Trad Sr. and Therezinha Mandetta Trad, and the brother of Nelson Trad Filho and Marcos Marcello Trad.

He served as president of the Order of Attorneys of Brazil in Mato Grosso do Sul and taught at the Federal University of Mato Grosso do Sul.
