= Terenos =

- Municipality
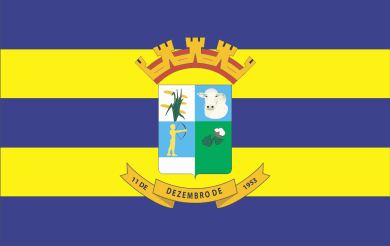
- Flag

- Location in Mato Grosso do Sul state

- Location in Brazil
- Coordinates: 20°26′31″S 54°51′36″W
- Country: Brazil
- Region: Central-West
- State: Mato Grosso do Sul

Area
  - Total: 2,841 km^{2} (1,097 sq mi)

Population (2020)
  - Total: 22,269
  - Density: 7.838/km^{2} (20.30/sq mi)
- Time zone: UTC−4 (AMT)

Terenos is a municipality located in the Brazilian state of Mato Grosso do Sul. Its population was 22,269 (2020) and its area is 2,841 km^{2}.
