= Nelson Trad Filho =

Brazilian politician and physician

Nelson Trad
- Official portrait

Senator for Mato Grosso do Sul
- Incumbent
- Assumed office 1 February 2019

Personal details
- Born: Nelson Trad Filho; 5 September 1961 (age 65) Campo Grande, Mato Grosso do Sul
- Party: PSD (since 2019)
- Children: 1
- Parents: Nelson Trad Sr. (father); Therezinha Mandetta (mother)
- Relatives: Marcos Marcello Trad (brother); Fábio Trad (brother)
- Education: Universidade Gama Filho
- Profession: Doctor

Nelson Trad Filho (born 5 September 1961), better known as Nelsinho Trad, is a Brazilian physician and politician, affiliated with the Social Democratic Party (PSD), is currently a senator for Mato Grosso do Sul. Son of the politician Nelson Trad Sr., he graduated in Medicine from Universidade Gama Filho in Rio de Janeiro, Brazil. Physician specializing in General Surgery, Urology, Occupational Medicine and Public Health.

He is married to Keilla Soares, with whom he is the father of a girl.

== Career ==
He began his political career as deputy director of Previsul (Instituto de Previdência do Estado de Mato Grosso do Sul) in the government of Pedro Pedrossian.

Affiliated with the Brazilian Labor Party (PTB), he was elected councilor for Campo Grande in 1992 and re-elected successively in 1996 and 2000. In the biennium 2001/2002 he chaired the City Council.

In 2002, he was elected state representative with the most votes, with 36,283 votes. In 2003, he transferred from the PTB to the Brazilian Democratic Movement Party (PMDB), where he ran for mayor of the capital in 2004, winning the dispute in the first round with 213,000 votes, with Marisa Serrano as deputy mayor. As mayor, he was awarded in 2006 by the then Vice President José Alencar with the Officer's grade of the Order of Military Merit.

In 2008, he was re-elected mayor with 288,821 votes or 71.41 percent of the valid votes, with Edil Albuquerque as deputy mayor.

In 2014, he contested the election for the state government of Mato Grosso do Sul with the support of then governor André Puccinelli, later arrested on charges of embezzling public resources in the fifth phase of Operation Papiros de Mud and in Operation Mud Asphalt by the Federal Police. Trad digital campaign, coordinated by the company Medialogue Digital, was one of the first in Brazil to widely use the WhatsApp, a tool that later became a focus for the dissemination of false information and mass shootings in elections.

In 2018, back to the PTB, he was elected senator for Mato Grosso do Sul with 424,085 votes or 18.37 percent of the valid votes. In 2019, he transferred again, this time to the Social Democratic Party (PSD).
