= Grandes Rios =

Coordinates: 24°08′S 51°31′W

- Municipality
- Interactive map of Grandes Rios
- Country: Brazil
- Region: Southern
- State: Paraná
- Mesoregion: Norte Central Paranaense

Population (2020)
  - Total: 5,497
- Time zone: UTC−3 (BRT)

Grandes Rios is a municipality in the state of Paraná in the Southern Region of Brazil.

== See also ==
- List of municipalities in Paraná
