= Municipal Secretary of Youth of Campo Grande =

Brazilian administrative organisation

The Executive Secretariat of Youth of Campo Grande (SEJUV), formerly the Municipal Secretariat of Youth, is a municipal government agency of Campo Grande, Mato Grosso do Sul, Brazil. The agency is responsible for developing and implementing youth-related public policies, including programs in vocational training, financial education, and civic participation.

In December 2024, an administrative reform restructured the municipal secretary into an executive secretariat (Secretaria Executiva), effective 1 January 2025. Under the reform, SEJUV was placed under the coordination of the Municipal Secretariat of Government and Institutional Relations. Similar restructuring was applied to the Executive Secretariat of Culture and of Women. Existing programs and staff were retained.

== Services and programs ==
SEJUV offers programs related to education and employability for youth. These include training courses in areas such as administrative assistance, photography, food handling, branding, and digital marketing.

SEJUV also offers financial education programs in partnership with educational institutions.

== Gerando Líderes Institute ==
The Gerando Líderes Institute is an organization founded in late 2023 by Sanger Santos. According to media coverage, it partnered with SEJUV on youth training activities in 2024, including mentoring sessions conducted in partnership with private-sector organizations.

== Levanta Juventude Program ==
From July 1 to 5th 2024, the Gerando Líderes Institute with support from SEJUV hosted the “Levanta Juventude” (Lifting Up Youth) program in Campo Grande. According to local media reports, the event included mentoring activities for participating youth.

== Location ==
SEJUV's headquarters are in Campo Grande, and its programs are conducted at its headquarters and at other locations in the city, such as technology parks (ParkTec) and partner educational institutions (Estácio de Sá Instituto and Uniderp).

== List of secretaries ==
| Name | Period | Notes |
|---|---|---|
| Maicon Nogueira | April 14, 2023 – April 5, 2024 | First head of SEJUV |
| Michele Ferreira | April 5, 2024 – present | Took office after Nogueira left to run in the 2024 municipal elections |
