= João Henrique (politician) =

Brazilian politician (born 1988)

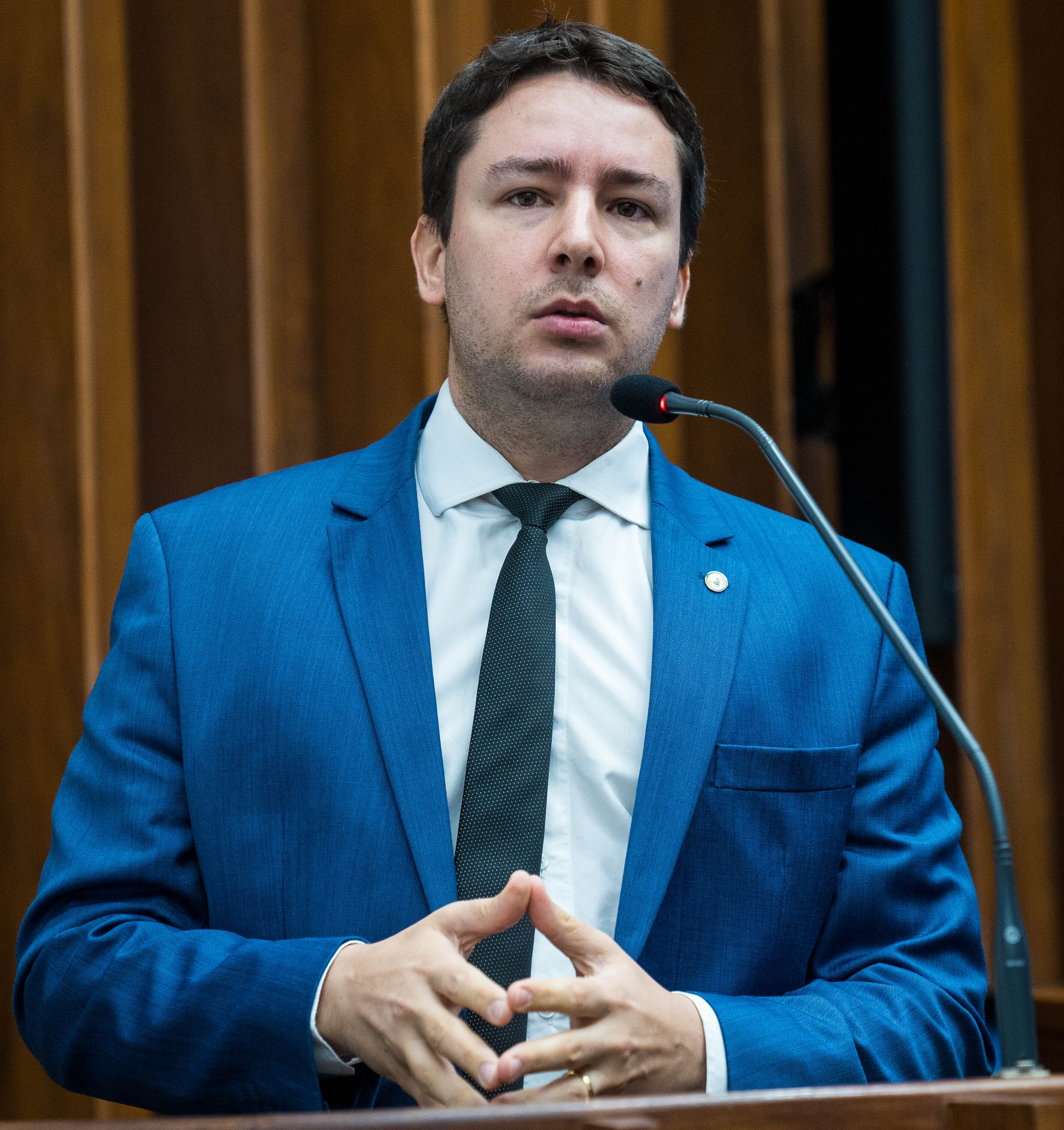
- João Henrique in 2023

Member of the Legislative Assembly of Mato Grosso do Sul
- Incumbent
- Assumed office 1 February 2019

Personal details
- Born: 19 April 1988 (age 38)
- Party: Liberal Party (since 2018)

João Henrique Miranda Soares Catan (born 19 April 1988), known mononymously as João Henrique, is a Brazilian politician serving as a member of the Legislative Assembly of Mato Grosso do Sul since 2019. He is the grandson of Marcelo Miranda Soares.
