= Municipal Chamber of Campo Grande =

Legislative body of Campo Grande, Brazil

The Campo Grande City Council is the legislative body of the municipality of Campo Grande, the capital of the state of Mato Grosso do Sul, Brazil. It is responsible for creating and approving municipal laws, overseeing the executive branch, and representing the interests of the citizens of Campo Grande.

The City Council is located at Av. Ricardo Brandão 1600, Campo Grande, MS, 79040–110, Brazil.

== History ==
In 1899, the official gazette of the state of Mato Grosso published a decree signed by Serre liberating the town of San Antonio de Campo Grande. Antonio Pedro Alves de Barros, President of the country. In this way, a future capital was born, welcoming everyone who came with open arms.

City Hall operates from the home of Governor-elect Francisco Mestre and has no employees. The deputies took office only in 1905 and met at the residence of President Jeronimo José de Santa Anna. It was not until 1910, 11 years after liberation, that the first public building in Campo Grande was built.

The federal government's construction of the Northwest Railway brought tremendous progress, jobs, and political importance. The city's political status received a major boost in 1914 with the completion of the railway, and councilors began to play a decisive role in events.

Campo Grande did not become the capital until 1978, when Albino Coimbra Filho Jr. became president of the first legislative session of the city council and was promoted to capital in 1979.

During its more than 100 years of history, the City Council has brought together great people who have always fought for the well-being and quality of life of the people and sought the best results for Campo Grande society.

== Structure ==
The City Council is composed of 29 councilors who are elected by the citizens of Campo Grande every four years. These councilors are responsible for proposing, debating, and voting on legislation that affects the municipality. The council is led by a president, who is elected from among the councilors.

=== 10th Legislature ===
During the four years of the 10th Legislature of the City Council of Campo Grande, 322 regular sessions and 12 extraordinary sessions were held, resulting in the approval of 1,445 projects. Notable among these is the Urban and Environmental Development Master Plan, which outlines guidelines for the city's expansion over the next 30 years. Other significant projects included career and salary plans for various professional categories, and initiatives in areas such as accessibility, education, and health.

In 2017, the City Council held a Public Examination for Effective Positions in its Permanent Staff. A total of 70 positions were offered for mid-level and higher-level employees, with appointments made in 2018 and 2019.

The COVID-19 pandemic in 2020 led to significant adaptations within the City Council, as with all sectors of society. In March 2020, regular sessions and public hearings were closed to the public, with live broadcasts available via Facebook and YouTube. Sessions were temporarily held remotely, via videoconference, to further reduce in-person contact during this period. The council promoted weekly live streams through the Special Committee for COVID-19 Support, discussing the disease with healthcare professionals, covering prevention methods, treatment options, and government decrees on social distancing measures.

Additionally, during the 10th Legislature, the City Council building underwent major renovations to improve accessibility. These included installing ramps, elevators for people with disabilities, relocating all offices to the ground floor, and making adjustments to the Plenary, such as installing chairs adapted for obese individuals, Braille plates on handrails, and tactile flooring. The council's website was also updated with the Audima system for text-to-speech functionality to aid visually impaired users, and VLibras to assist with sign language interpretation of the site's content. Furthermore, the hashtag #PraCegoVer was adopted to describe images, and the City Council introduced a sign language interpreter for official events and broadcasts.

==== Current councilors and substitutes ====
- Prof. João Rocha (president 2017–2020)
- Carlão
- Dharleng Campos
- Enfermeira Cida
- Derly dos Reis de Oliveira (Cazuza)
- Roberto Santana dos Santos (Betinho)
- Chiquinho Telles
- Dr. Loester Nunes de Oliveira
- Dr. Antônio Cruz
- Enfermeiro Fritz
- Dr. Livio Viana
- João César Mattogrosso
- Ayrton Araújo
- Gilmar Neri de Souza (Gilmar da Cruz)
- Paulo Siufi (substituído em 2019 pelo suplente Dr. Wilson Sami)
- Lucas de Lima (replaced in 2019 by alternate Dr. Eduardo Cury)
- Epaminondas Vicente Silva Neto (Papy)
- Otávio Trad
- William Maksoud
- Valdir Gomes
- André Salineiro
- Ademir Santana
- Eduardo Romero
- Pastor Jeremias Flores
- Delegado Wellington
- Junior Longo
- Odilon de Oliveira Júnior
- Francisco Veterinário
- Vinicius Siqueira

== Functions ==
The primary functions of the Campo Grande City Council include:

- Legislation: Drafting and approving laws that govern the municipality.
- Oversight: Monitoring the activities of the executive branch to ensure transparency and accountability.
- Representation: Representing the interests and concerns of the citizens of Campo Grande.
- Budget Approval: Reviewing and approving the municipal budget proposed by the executive branch.

== Activities ==
The City Council engages in various activities to fulfill its legislative and oversight roles. These include regular sessions, public hearings, and committee meetings. The council also interacts with the community through various programs and initiatives aimed at promoting civic engagement and addressing local issues.
