= Mayor of Campo Grande =

Head of government

- Seal of the City of Campo Grande

- Standard of the mayor of Campo Grande
- Incumbent; Adriane Lopes since April 2, 2022
- Government of Campo Grande
- Style: His Honor; Lady Mayor (informal)
- Residence: in your own residence
- Term length: Four years, renewable once consecutively
- Constituting instrument: Constitution of Brazil
- Inaugural holder: Francisco Mestre
- Formation: August 16, 1899; 127 years ago
- Unofficial names: Mayor of the Capital
- Deputy: Vice Mayor of Campo Grande
- Salary: R$ 20.412,12
- Website: www.campogrande.ms.gov.br

The Mayor of Campo Grande is the head of the executive branch of the municipal government in Campo Grande, first established on August 16, 1899, the office has evolved to oversee the administration and governance of the city, which is a key economic and cultural hub in the region. The mayor is responsible for managing public services, implementing policies, and ensuring the well-being of residents. The position is held for a four-year term, with the possibility of one consecutive re-election. The current mayor, Adriane Lopes, took office on April 2, 2022.

The Executive Branch is represented by the Mayor and his Cabinet of Secretaries, following the model proposed by the Federal Constitution. Since 2017, districts have been administered by subprefectures, with their heads appointed directly by the mayor.

== History ==
Campo Grande started as a small village founded in 1877 by farmers José Antônio Pereira and Manoel Vieira de Sousa (a.k.a. Manoel Olivério), who came from Minas Gerais just after the end of the Paraguayan War. They founded the village, known at that time as Santo Antônio de Campo Grande, near the Serra de Maracaju cliffs, at the confluence of two streams named Prosa and Segredo (Portuguese for "conversation" and "secret," respectively), whose courses now coincide with two of the city's most important avenues. In the end of 1877, the founder built the village's first church. The roughly aligned houses formed the first street, known as Rua Velha (Old Street), today Rua 26 de Agosto (26 August Street). This street ended where today one finds a square in honor of the immigrants that later came to the city.

The city started to develop relatively fast because of its privileged climate and location. These factors drew people from other regions of the country, especially the South, the Southeast and the Northeast regions. The settlement was officially recognized as a municipality by the State Government on August 26, 1899, and renamed Campo Grande.

== Political changes ==
Throughout its history, the position of mayor has seen various changes in its selection process. During the Revolution of 1930, the mayor was deposed and replaced on the same day Getúlio Vargas became the President of Brazil. The mayor’s election process was later changed to secret ballot voting. There have been periods, such as during the Vargas Era and the military dictatorship, when the mayor was appointed by the state governor. Democratic elections for the mayor were resumed in 1985. In 2014, Mayor Alcides Bernal was impeached, and his deputy, Gilmar Olarte, took over. However, Olarte was later removed from office, and Bernal returned as mayor following a judicial decision.

== Current mayor ==
As of 2022, the Mayor of Campo Grande is Adriane Lopes, who assumed the position after the resignation of Marquinhos Trad.

== List ==
The following is a list of mayors of the city of Campo Grande, in the state of Mato Grosso do Sul, Brazil.

- Francisco Mestre, 1899–1904
- Manoel Inácio de Souza, 1904–1909
- João Carlos Sebastião, 1909
- José Santiago, 1909–1910, 1912–1914
- Antônio Norberto de Almeida, 1910–1911, 1919–1920
- João Clímaco Vidal, 1915
- Sebastião da Costa Lima, 1915–1917
- Fernando Novais, 1917
- Leonel Velasco, 1918
- Vespasiano Barbosa Martins, 1918, 1931–1932, 1934–1935, 1941–1942
- Rosário Congro, 1918–1919
- Arnaldo Estêvão de Figueiredo, 1920–1921
- Arlindo de Andrade Gomes, 1921–1924
- Arnaldo Estevão de Figueiredo, 1924–1926
- Jonas Corrêa da Costa, 1927–1929
- Inácio Franco de Carvalho, 1929
- Antonio Antero de Barros, 1930
- Mário Pinto Peixoto da Cunha, 1930
- Deusdedit de Carvalho, 1930
- Cesar Bacchi de Araújo, 1930–1931
- Valdomiro Siqueira, 1931
- Arthur Jorge Mendes Sobrinho, 1932
- Ytrio Corrêa da Costa, 1932–1933
- Pacífico Lopes de Siqueira, 1933–1934
- Antônio Luís Almeida Boaventura, 1935–1937
- Lourival Azambuja, 1937
- Juvenal Vieira de Almeida, 1937
- Eduardo Olímpio Machado, 1937–1941
- Demósthenes Martins, 1941, 1942–1945
- Joaquim Teodoro de Faria, 1945–1947
- Carlos Hugueney Filho, 1947
- Fernando Correia da Costa, 1947–1951
- Ary Coelho, 1951–1952
- Mário Carrato, 1952
- Nelson Borges de Barros, 1952–1953
- Wilson Fadul, 1953–1955
- Marcílio de Oliveira Lima, 1955–1959
- Wilson Barbosa Martins, 1959–1963
- Luiz Alexandre de Oliveira, 1963
- Mendes Canale, 1963–1967
- Plínio Martins, 1967–1970
- Mendes Canale, 1970–1973
- Levy Dias, 1973–1977, 1980–1982
- Marcelo Miranda, 1977–1979
- Albino Coimbra Filho, 1979–1980
- Leon Denizart Conte, 1980
- Valdir Pires Cardoso, 1982
- Heráclito de Figueiredo, 1982–1983
- Nelly Bacha, 1983
- Lúdio Coelho, 1983–1985, 1989–1992
- Juvêncio da Fonseca, 1986–1988, 1993–1996
- André Puccinelli, 1997–2004
- Nelson Trad Filho, 2005–2012
- Alcides Bernal, 2013–2014, 2015–2016
- Gilmar Olarte, 2014–2015
- Marcos Trad, 2017–2022
- Adriane Lopes, 2022—present

== See also ==
- Politics of Campo Grande
- Câmara Municipal de Campo Grande (city council)
- Campo Grande history
- History of Campo Grande
- History of Mato Grosso do Sul (state)
- List of mayors of largest cities in Brazil (in Portuguese)
- List of mayors of capitals of Brazil (in Portuguese)
