= List of massacres in Switzerland =

The following is a list of massacres and mass murders that have occurred in Switzerland. A mass murder involves the murder of four or more people during the same incident.

== 14-20th centuries ==
Date	Location	Dead	Description
November 1348	Bern		Jewish community killed by burning. One of the earliest massacres of the 1348/1349 persecutions in a German speaking city.
November 1348	Zofingen	4 + x	Four Jews killed in autumn after they had confessed under torture to have poisoned the wells. The Jewish community of Zofingen was likely burnt soon after in November 1348.
November 1348	Solothurn		Jewish community killed by burning.
16 January 1349	Basel	50-70	Basel massacre: Jewish community burnt.
22 February 1349	Schaffhausen		Jewish community burnt.
23 February 1349	Zürich	≈60	Zürich massacre: The best source dates the event on evening of Feb 23 without giving further details. One source dates the event on Feb 21. The Jewish community of Zürich at that time had about 100 members out of a population of 6,000. Sources indicate that several women and children were spared as were those willing to accept baptism.
18 September 1349	Winterthur	330	Winterthur massacre: Jewish community of Winterthur and several other cities (among them Aarau) under the rule of Duke Albrecht of Austria burnt on a hill called Brühlberg. Albrecht tried in vain to protect the Jews by sheltering them for several months in his castle Kyburg, 7 km south of Winterthur.
25 June 1401	Schaffhausen	30	Schaffhausen massacre: Jews executed by burning.
25 May 1444	Greifensee	62	Murder of Greifensee: Garrison of a castle beheaded after successful siege, part of the Old Zürich War.
9 September 1798	Canton of Nidwalden	400+	Catholics killed by French Troops.

== 20-21st centuries ==
Date	Location	Canton	Dead	Injured	Total	Description
21 December 1909	Hellbühl	Canton of Lucerne	4	0	4	A man shot and killed a couple and their two farmhands..
30 August 1912	Romanshorn	Canton of Thurgau	7	7 (Note: Including the perpetrator.)	14	Romanshorn shooting: Seven people shot, seven more injured including the mentally ill perpetrator.
6 February 1922	Lumino	Republic and Canton of Ticino	6	8	14	A man killed five people and wounded eight others in a shooting spree. The gunman killed himself.
23 March 1927	Zürich	Canton of Zürich	5	1	6	After his wife petitioned for divorce, a man killed four family members and wounded another before committing suicide.
9 November 1932	Geneva	Canton of Geneva	13	65	78	November 1932 Geneva shooting: Police and army fired on a crowd protesting a fascist demonstration.
April 1937	Eaux Vives	Canton of Geneva	5	7	15	A man caused an explosion which killed him and four others. Seven people were wounded.
26 April 1943	Zürich	Canton of Zürich	7	0	7	A man killed six family members and himself.
21 February 1970	Würenlingen	Canton of Aargau	47	0	47	Swissair Flight 330: A bomb exploded on board of a plane killing forty-seven people.
5 June 1976	Seewen	Canton of Solothurn	5	0	5	Seewen murder case: Five people shot. The crime has never been solved.
16 April 1986	Zürich	Canton of Zürich	4	1	5	1986 Zurich shooting: A man killed four colleagues and wounded a fifth at his workplace.
30 August 1990	Zürich	Canton of Thurgau, Canton of Zürich	6	4	10	A man killed his family before traveling to Zürich and shooting six people, two fatally. He fled the scene and later killed himself.
19 May 1991	Val-d'Illiez	Canton of Valais	6	0	6	A 42-year-old man shot to death all five members of his family, before killing himself in an Alpine cottage.
4 March 1992	Lugano District	Republic and Canton of Ticino	6	6	12	Rivera massacre: A man opened fire at multiple homes, killing six and wounding six before being arrested.
5 October 1994	Cheiry, Salvan	Canton of Freiburg, Canton of Valais	48			Two cult mass murder-suicides related to the Order of the Solar Temple left forty-eight people dead.
27 September 2001	Zug	Canton of Zug	15	18	33	Zug massacre: People shot in the parliament of the Canton of Zug. The perpetrator later killed himself.
29 March 2004	Escholzmatt	Canton of Lucerne	5	0	5	A man shot and killed four family members with a pistol, before committing suicide.
27 February 2013	Menznau	Canton of Lucerne	5	5	10	2013 Menznau shooting: A man opened fire at his workplace, killing four people and wounding five before dying of a self-inflicted gunshot wound.
9 May 2015	Würenlingen	Canton of Aargau	5	0	5	Four people killed before the perpetrator shot himself in a domestic incident.
21 December 2015	Rupperswil	Canton of Aargau	4	0	4	Rupperswil murder case: A man murdered four people with a knife.
9 March 2023	Yverdon-les-Bains	Canton of Vaud	5	0	5	Police suspect that a man shot and killed his wife and three daughters before committing suicide.

== See also ==
- History of Switzerland
- List of battles of the Old Swiss Confederacy
- List of mass shootings in Switzerland
