= List of mass shootings in Switzerland =

This article is a list of mass shootings in Switzerland. Mass shootings are incidents of firearm-related violence that result in at least four people being killed or injured. The data in this article includes the death of perpetrators, including suicides or the killing of the perpetrator by police. Inclusion of perpetrator casualties and injured victims is at variance to some but not all definitions of mass shooting. The vast majority of mass shootings in Switzerland that are noted in this article are familicides, not public mass shootings. Despite its high rates of gun ownership and liberal firearms laws, Switzerland has been noted to have low rates of gun-related crime.

== 20th century ==
| Date | Location | Canton | Dead | Injured | Total | Description |
|---|---|---|---|---|---|---|
| 28 August 1905 | Commugny | Canton of Vaud | 3 | 1 (Note: Including the perpetrator.) | 4 | Commugny familicide: A man shot and killed three family members with a rifle before attempting suicide. |
| 21 December 1909 | Hellbühl | Canton of Lucerne | 4 | 0 | 4 | A man shot and killed a couple and their two farmhands. The perpetrator then tried unsuccessfully to set the house on fire, while seven children and three adults were still inside. The gunman was later sentenced to death and executed. |
| 30 August 1912 | Romanshorn | Canton of Thurgau | 7 | 7 | 14 | Romanshorn shooting: A man fired into the street from the window of his apartment, killing six people and wounding six. After a siege, the gunman fled into the forest, where he killed another person before being wounded and arrested. |
| 14 November 1913 | Territet | Canton of Vaud | 4 | 0 | 4 | A man shot and killed three family members with a revolver before killing himself. |
| 6 February 1922 | Lumino | Canton of Ticino | 6 | 8 | 14 | A man killed five people and wounded eight others in a shooting spree. The gunman killed himself. |
| 25 July 1924 | Oberburg | Canton of Bern | 4 | 0 | 0 | A factory worker shot and killed his three children and himself. |
| 23 October 1925 | Geneva | Canton of Geneva | 4 | 0 | 4 | A man armed with a revolver killed his wife, two children and himself. |
| 23 March 1927 | Zürich | Canton of Zürich | 5 | 1 | 6 | After his wife petitioned for divorce, a man killed four family members and wounded another before committing suicide. |
| 30 December 1929 | Solothurn | Canton of Solothurn | 4 | 0 | 0 | A factory owner shot and killed his wife, two children and himself. |
| 9 November 1932 | Geneva | Canton of Geneva | 13 | 65 | 78 | November 1932 Geneva shooting: Swiss Army soldiers fired into a crowd of protesters, killing thirteen and wounding sixty-five. |
| 15 April 1941 | Zürich | Canton of Zürich | 2 | 2 | 4 | Police responding on 15 April to a report of a husband threatening his wife were shot at by the man. One officer was killed and two others were wounded. The gunman killed himself after a standoff that lasted into the morning hours of 16 April. |
| 26 April 1943 | Zürich | Canton of Zürich | 7 | 0 | 7 | A man killed six family members and himself. |
| 17 June 1962 | Fideris | Canton of Grisons | 4 | 0 | 4 | A mentally ill man fatally shot three people at random before later killing himself. |
| 20 December 1965 | Emmental | Canton of Bern | 2 | 6 | 8 | A man shot and wounded seven neighbors before killing himself. One of the neighbors later died of his wounds. |
| 24 May 1967 | Rüti | Canton of Zürich | 3 | 1 | 4 | A man killed his son and two other people before attempting suicide. |
| 4 May 1968 | Sankt Josef | Nidwalden | 0 | 5 | 5 | A man shot and wounded five people at random, including a pregnant woman, two of her children and a married couple. |
| 18 February 1969 | Kloten | Canton of Zürich | 2 | 6 | 8 | El Al Flight 432 attack: Four terrorists shot and killed one person and wounded six others aboard an El Al flight. One perpetrator was killed by a security agent. |
| 21 April 1969 | Zürich | Canton of Zürich | 2 | 2 | 4 | A gardener at a tuberculosis sanitarium killed two employees and wounded two others with a pistol before surrendering to police. |
| 2 January 1974 | Chur | Canton of Grisons | 2 | 4 | 6 | A man intruded into an apartment where his ex-girlfriend was visiting. He shot five men inside the apartment, killing one, and then fatally shot himself. |
| June 1976 | Seewen | Canton of Solothurn | 5 | 0 | 5 | Seewen murder case: Five family members were killed at their home. |
| 12 January 1977 | Forel | Canton of Vaud | 5 | 1 | 6 | A man shot his wife, his three children, and his girlfriend before killing himself. His wife was the only survivor. |
| 19 November 1979 | Zürich | Canton of Zürich | 1 | 3 | 4 | After a robbery of the Schweizerische Volksbank, four Red Army Faction terrorists exchanged gunfire with police at Zürich Hauptbahnhof, killing a bystander and wounding three other people, including two police officers. |
| 24 December 1980 | Rietheim/Koblenz | Canton of Aargau | 3 | 2 | 5 | A far-right extremist shot and killed two police officers and wounded two others at multiple locations, then killed himself during a manhunt. |
| 18 January 1981 | Castaneda | Canton of Grisons | 2 | 3 | 5 | A heavily armed gunman shot and killed one person and wounded three others before killing himself following a police search. |
| 3 October 1983 | Geneva | Canton of Geneva | 4 | 0 | 4 | A man shot and killed three family members with a pistol before killing himself. |
| 25 February 1985 | Cortaillod | Canton of Neuchâtel | 0 | 6 | 6 | A man shot and wounded five co-workers at his workplace before attempting suicide. |
| 16 April 1986 | Zürich | Canton of Zürich | 4 | 1 | 5 | 1986 Zurich shooting: A man killed four colleagues and wounded a fifth at his workplace. |
| 27 November 1988 | Geneva | Canton of Geneva | 1 | 4 | 5 | A man shot and wounded four people with a pistol at two locations before killing himself. |
| 20 June 1990 | Zürich | Canton of Zürich | 0 | 4 | 4 | A thief, two police officers, and an uninvolved person were shot and wounded during a police chase at Zürich Hauptbahnhof. Both the thief and the officers were armed, but only the officers fired their weapons. |
| 30 August 1990 | Rickenbach/Zürich | Canton of Thurgau/Canton of Zürich | 6 | 4 | 10 | A man killed his family in Rickenbach before traveling to Zürich and shooting six people, two fatally. He fled the scene and later killed himself in Gossau. |
| 19 May 1991 | Val-d'Illiez | Canton of Valais | 6 | 0 | 6 | A 42-year-old man shot to death all five members of his family before killing himself in an Alpine cottage. |
| 4 March 1992 | Lugano District | Canton of Ticino | 6 | 6 | 12 | Rivera massacre: A man opened fire at multiple homes, killing six and wounding six others before being arrested. |
| 19 March 1992 | Muttenz | Basel-Landschaft | 3 | 2 | 5 | A man shot at his ex-girlfriend and her family members, killing three and wounding one, before attempting suicide. |
| 3 October 1992 | Lugano | Canton of Ticino | 3 | 2 | 5 | Several escapees from the local Stampa prison were intercepted by police officers, resulting in a shootout that left two inmates and an officer dead and two other inmates wounded. |
| 14 February 1993 | Eriswil | Canton of Bern | 4 | 0 | 4 | A man shot and killed three family members inside a farmhouse before killing himself. |
| 27 February 1993 | Bern | Canton of Bern | 4 | 0 | 4 | A man opened fire at his workplace, killing three people (including two family members) before killing himself. |
| 17 March 1993 | Sementina | Canton of Ticino | 4 | 0 | 4 | A man fatally shot his wife and two children before killing himself. |
| 24 June 1993 | Bern | Canton of Bern | 1 | 7 | 8 | As Kurds attacked a Turkish embassy, guards opened fire, killing one demonstrator and wounding seven other people, including six Kurds and a city police officer. |
| 2 July 1994 | Lucerne | Canton of Lucerne | 2 | 4 | 6 | A man fired two shots from a shotgun at his ex-wife during a celebration at a women's shelter, killing his wife and wounding four other women. The shooter killed himself with a third shot. |
| 5 October 1994 | Cheiry | Canton of Fribourg | 21 | 0 | 21 | Cheiry massacre: Twenty-one members of a cult were shot and killed during a mass murder-suicide. |
| 28 November 1994 | St. Gallen | Canton of St. Gallen | 1 | 4 | 5 | A man opened fire at his workplace, killing one person and wounding four. |
| 10 September 1995 | Winterthur | Canton of Zürich | 1 | 3 | 4 | Four people were shot, one fatally, when an Albanian man shot at other Albanian immigrants in a club. |
| 2 April 1996 | Winterthur | Canton of Zürich | 0 | 4 | 4 | During a dispute among Tamil immigrants, shots were fired, wounding four of those involved. Eleven people were arrested, including the four people shot. |
| 6 August 1996 | Schaffhausen | Canton of Schaffhausen | 1 | 3 | 4 | A man shot and wounded three people in a domestic dispute before killing himself. |
| 3 February 1997 | Frauenfeld | Canton of Thurgau | 0 | 4 | 4 | Four people were shot in a gunfight outside a brothel. |
| 27 July 1998 | Bern | Canton of Bern | 4 | 0 | 4 | Four men were found shot dead at a tea room. |
| 16 April 1999 | Zürich | Canton of Zürich | 1 | 5 | 6 | Three gunmen shot and killed one person and wounded five others at a cafe in Oerlikon. |
| 24 May 1999 | Seftigen/Thun | Canton of Bern | 1 | 3 | 4 | A man shot and wounded two relatives in Seftigen before traveling to Thun and fatally shooting his wife. He attempted suicide along the A6 motorway. |
| September 1999 | Murten | Canton of Fribourg | 1 | 3 | 4 | A romantic dispute between two families resulted in a shootout in which one person was killed and three others wounded. |
| 4 February 2000 | Dulliken | Canton of Solothurn | 2 | 3 | 5 | Two robbers opened fire in a restaurant, killing two people and wounding three others. |
| 10 December 2000 | Zürich | Canton of Zürich | 0 | 4 | 4 | Four people were wounded by gunfire outside a bar. |

== 21st century ==
| Date | Location | Canton | Dead | Injured | Total | Description |
|---|---|---|---|---|---|---|
| September 2001 | Au | Canton of Zürich | 4 | 0 | 4 | A man shot and killed his wife and two children before killing himself. |
| 27 September 2001 | Zug | Canton of Zug | 15 | 18 | 33 | Zug massacre: A man entered the Parliament of the Canton of Zug and shot thirty-two people, killing fourteen. The shooter killed himself. |
| 8 November 2001 | Melano | Republic and Canton of Ticino | 4 | 0 | 4 | A bank employee shot and killed his wife and two school-age children before killing himself. |
| 19 February 2002 | Lausanne | Canton of Vaud | 2 | 2 | 4 | A man shot three people in a cinema, killing one, before killing himself. |
| 4 July 2003 | Pratteln | Basel-Landschaft | 3 | 1 | 4 | A man killed three and wounded one in a domestic dispute before fleeing. |
| 8 November 2003 | Sonceboz-Sombeval | Canton of Bern | 1 | 3 | 4 | Several nightclub employees and patrons had a dispute that escalated into a fistfight and then a shooting, leaving a man dead and three other people wounded. |
| 3 December 2003 | Witikon | Canton of Zürich | 4 | 0 | 4 | A family of four was found dead in Witikon. All were shot, as were two dogs. According to the police investigation, the parents planned the crime because of financial problems. |
| 29 March 2004 | Escholzmatt | Canton of Lucerne | 5 | 0 | 5 | A man shot and killed four people, including three family members, with a pistol, before killing himself. |
| 15 July 2004 | Lenk im Simmental | Canton of Bern | 4 | 0 | 4 | A man shot and killed three family members with a pistol, before killing himself. |
| 30 March 2005 | Muri | Canton of Aargau | 4 | 0 | 4 | A man shot and killed three family members before killing himself. |
| 30 April 2006 | Les Crosets | Canton of Valais | 4 | 1 | 5 | Murder of Corinne Rey-Bellet: A man armed with a handgun shot and killed his pregnant wife, her brother and seriously wounded her mother before killing himself. |
| 12 April 2007 | Baden | Canton of Aargau | 1 | 4 | 5 | A man entered a hotel and opened fire, killing one person and wounding four. The shooter was arrested. |
| 6 March 2009 | Carouge | Canton of Geneva | 4 | 0 | 4 | A man shot and killed three family members before killing himself. |
| 2 January 2013 | Daillon | Canton of Valais | 3 | 3 | 6 | A man killed three people and wounded two before being wounded by police and arrested. |
| 27 February 2013 | Menznau | Canton of Lucerne | 5 | 5 | 10 | 2013 Menznau shooting: A man opened fire at his workplace, killing four people and wounding five before dying of a self-inflicted gunshot wound. |
| 9 May 2015 | Würenlingen | Canton of Aargau | 5 | 0 | 5 | A man killed four relatives before killing himself. |
| 19 December 2016 | Zürich | Canton of Zürich | 1 | 3 | 4 | Zürich Islamic center shooting: A gunman wounded three people at an Islamic center before killing himself. The day before the shooting, the gunman stabbed to death a former friend. |
| 18 July 2019 | Affoltern am Albis | Canton of Zürich | 4 | 0 | 4 | A man shot and killed his wife, two children, and himself. |
| 29 February 2020 | Grandson | Canton of Vaud | 2 | 3 | 5 | Two people were killed and three others were wounded after a drug trade related-shooting incident in an apartment. |
| 9 March 2023 | Yverdon-les-Bains | Canton of Vaud | 5 | 0 | 5 | Police suspect that a man shot and killed his wife and three daughters before killing himself. |
| 30 August 2026 | Aarau | Canton of Aargau | 1 | 5 | 6 | Following a rave party on the night of 30 August 2026, a woman was shot dead and five other people were injured. The victim was Italian, her name was Maria Spinelli and she was 22 years old. One day after, the suspected perpetrator, a 43-year-old Swiss man, was arrested. He is considered to be a lone perpetrator. He is accused of firing a pistol and an assault rifle at the guests at the techno party. |

== See also ==
- List of mass shootings in Austria
- List of mass shootings in France
- List of mass shootings in Germany
- List of mass shootings in Italy
