= Waffengesetz =

Waffengesetz may refer to:

- Gun legislation in Germany
- Gun politics in Switzerland
