= Rudolf Schümperli =

Swiss politician

Rudolf Schümperli (5 March 1907, Frauenfeld – 11 March 1990, Romanshorn) was a Swiss politician (Social Democratic Party of Switzerland).

Schümperli, trained as a school teacher, was a member of the local council of Romanshorn from 1937 to 1953, from 1943 to 1954 a member of the National Council and from 1954 to 1972 of the Conseil d'État of the Canton of Thurgau. In this job he followed August Roth (who died in office) leading on building control, and then becoming health and public education director until his retirement.
