= Zug massacre =

2001 mass shooting in Switzerland

- The parliament building in Zug in 2012, almost 11 years after the massacre

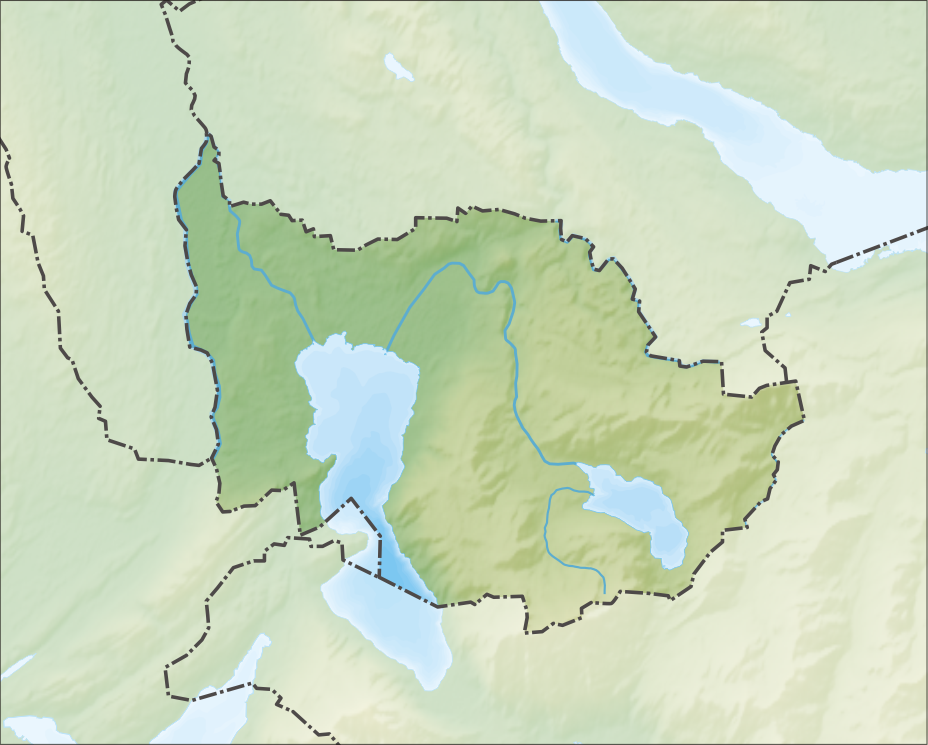
- Zug (Canton of Zug) Zug (Switzerland) Location of the Zug parliament building within the Canton of Zug and Switzerland
- Native name: Zuger Attentat
- Location: 47.1678°N 8.5147°E; Parlamentsgebäude of Zug, Canton of Zug, Switzerland
- Date: 27 September 2001; 25 years ago 10:30 a.m. – 10:34 a.m.
- Target: Cantonal Minister Robert Bisig and other members of the Zug Parliament
- Attack type: Mass shooting, bombing, murder-suicide
- Weapons: SIG SG 550 assault rifle; Remington Model 870 Express pump-action shotgun; S&W Model 19-7 revolver; SIG Sauer P232 SL semi-automatic pistol; Homemade bomb
- Deaths: 15 (including the perpetrator)
- Injuries: 18
- Perpetrator: Friedrich Leibacher
- Motive: Retaliation for perceived mistreatment by the Zug Parliament

The Zug massacre was a mass shooting that took place on 27 September 2001 in the parliament of the Canton of Zug, Switzerland. 57-year-old Friedrich Leibacher shot and killed 14 people in the parliament before killing himself. He was armed with an assault rifle, a pump-action shotgun, two handguns and a homemade bomb and had entered the building disguised as a police officer. All of the weapons used were legally obtained. It was the first time a Swiss politician was killed since the 19th century.

Leibacher had a long history of criminal actions, among them several instances of assault, illegal importation of guns and child molestation, as well as violent threats. Despite this, his criminal record was expunged and he was approved to buy firearms. Three years before the massacre, he was sued for threatening a man with a gun. Afterwards he was under police surveillance and became embroiled in a legal battle with the Canton of Zug. He became aggrieved against the legal system, particularly blaming Cantonal Minister Robert Bisig. He left a letter with these accusations, titled "Day of Reckoning for the Zug Mafia". Bisig himself survived the attack.

In the aftermath of the shooting, there were changes in building security policies in Switzerland, which had previously been lax. In addition, new practices on how to handle people who make threats were instituted in several cantons. There were no changes in gun laws as a result of the shooting, with the discussion in the aftermath having focused more on building security. After the shooting and several other violent incidents, a 2011 federal initiative for more severe gun laws was rejected by 56.3% of voters.

== Background ==
The massacre occurred sixteen days after the September 11 attacks in the United States, which killed 2,996 people. In 2001, around 500,000 people in Switzerland possessed firearms as a result of the Swiss Militia System, which requires men over 20 to be ready for a call to service. Switzerland has one of the highest gun ownership rates in the world, and in 2011, there were 3.4 million firearms in the country compared to the population of 8 million. Despite these figures, the country has relatively low gun-related crime with one gun-related death for every 200,000 people. Switzerland then had a relatively permissive policy when it came to public access to administrative buildings.

== Perpetrator ==
Leibacher in the Dominican Republic, in a photo from 1991

Friedrich Heinz "Fritz" Leibacher was born in Zug on 21 July 1944, with two brothers in a middle-class family. His father said when he started school it was as if "Satan entered him"; he was first arrested at 13 for publicly shooting a rifle and threatening to kill his own mother. Afterwards, his parents requested he be sent to a reformatory. Following a variety of different diagnoses, in 1960, at the age of 16, he was deemed a potentially dangerous psychopath by a psychiatrist. He was released from the reformatory that year.

He became a drifter, though for some time he was a clerical assistant in Zurich. In this period he committed a number of crimes. (Note: Among the acts he was accused or convicted for in the period from 1957 to 1969 were: theft, mischief, disturbing the peace, harassment, trespassing, possible extortion, lewdness, damage to property, violation of the Road Traffic Act, sexual immorality with children, public lewd acts, driving without a license, sexual immorality, fraud, attempted fraud, receiving stolen goods, smuggling and forgery.) He had never served in the Militia System or the Swiss Armed Forces, having been deemed unfit in 1965. That year Leibacher acquired his high school diploma, and started studying law at the University of Zurich. His studies only lasted for a semester, as he was arrested for smuggling watches in Turkey and spent a resulting seven months in prison. He acquired a business degree, but other than training as a waiter was only occasionally employed.

He was noted as an exhibitionist and as extremely manipulative. Despite his constant criminality, he was only rarely convicted. In 1970 he was convicted of child molestation and sex in public, among other crimes. (Note: The crimes he was sentenced for by the criminal court of Zug were: theft, attempted theft, gang-related theft, repeated theft, receiving stolen goods, commercial fraud, sexual assault of children, public lewd acts, repeated forgery and violation of the Road Traffic Act. Separately, the Canton of Zug convicted him of violating the Federal Law on War Material.) Through fraud, he was subject to a youth sentence instead of an adult sentence, and as a result was sentenced to 18 months' detention and a fine of SFr 100, which was delayed and Leibacher was instead sentenced to a work facility. A 1970 psychiatric assessment described him as having schizoid personality disorder, hypochondriac traits and a need for attention. After his release, he became a management consultant and owned a company, Media Zeitschriften AG, which he used for illegitimate financial purposes. Throughout the next two decades he was accused of a variety of criminal acts, among them illegal importation of handguns into Switzerland, for which he was convicted three times but only got warning sentences. He was sued in 1982 for assaulting pedestrians. During this time he made many violent threats, some towards employment agency workers. Twice he was suspected in arson that he financially benefited from.

In 1975, he bought a sailing yacht which he used to travel the world. He had three failed marriages to women from the Dominican Republic; the first of his wives was 28 and the next two were 16. From these marriages he had three children. All his marriages were short, and marked by severe domestic abuse perpetrated by Leibacher. In 1994, he was arrested in the Dominican Republic for assaulting his third wife; he escaped through bribery and returned to Switzerland with his daughter. He was diagnosed by doctors in 1996 with antisocial personality disorder, probable alcoholism, mental impairment and mild schizophrenia. He was also deemed an unstable man, a "criminal psychopath" and was noted to have a weapons obsession. He received an invalidity pension in 1995, largely due to alleged tinnitus. His criminal record was expunged and police approved him to buy firearms. In 1997, he bought the assault rifle used in the shooting.

=== Government feud ===
On 17 October 1998, Leibacher threatened a bus driver with a gun during a fight. This had started as a personal argument, but he then accused the driver of being an alcoholic. The bus driver and his employer (Zugerland Verkehrsbetriebe) then sued Leibacher. Upset by his treatment, he wrote frequently to the authorities with letters of complaint and threats. The government of Zug offered to pay him, but Leibacher refused their offered sum, wanting a million. His complaints and attempts at seeking compensation were all rejected, and his writing only grew more aggressive. He contacted various human rights organizations, including the European Court of Human Rights and Amnesty International, to whom he complained that he was enduring what he called "torture" that caused him sickness. This resulted in several legal battles; the canton sued Leibacher for defamation and charges were pressed against him for his threats.

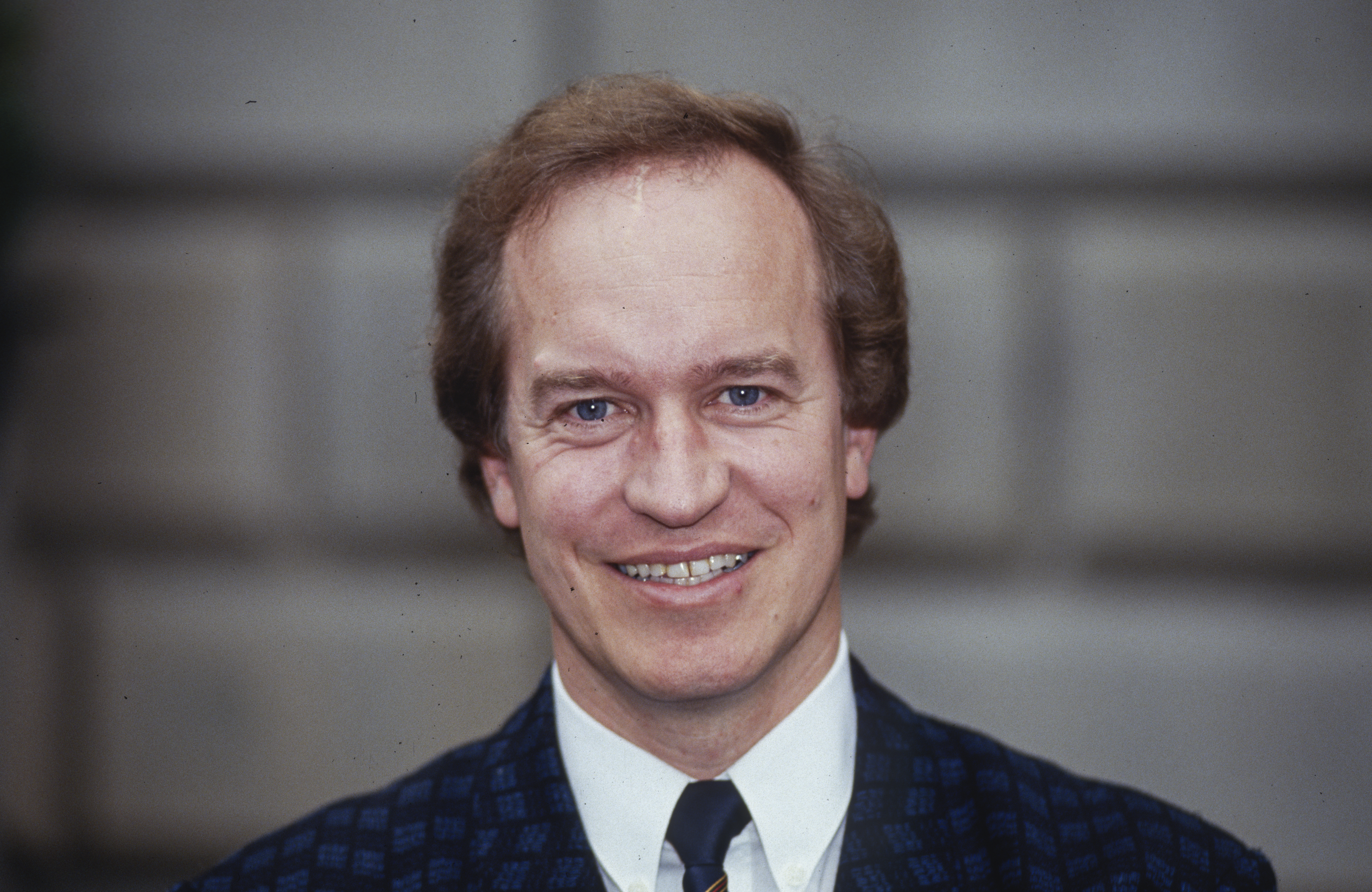
Robert Bisig in 1986

Leibacher filed several cases alleging corruption of various public officials, but they were dismissed by the court. Trying to end the legal battle the Director of Transport Robert Bisig offered to meet with Leibacher. In May 2001, Zug politicians unanimously rejected his complaint against them without discussion. In early 2001, he began writing private diary entries; at the same time, he also became fixated on a novel about the dictator Rafael Trujillo. He believed the novel contained meaningful parallels with his life, and may have identified himself with either Trujillo or the assassin in the book; he interpreted many events in his life in line with the book.

In the final months before the shooting, Leibacher closed his bank accounts, sold his home and his shares in stocks. The day before the shooting, he instructed a Swiss funeral home that when he died, he was to be cremated and have his ashes scattered across the Atlantic. The day of the attack he sent his lawyer a key, which unlocked a locker that contained several folders of case information. He also filed a will in the Dominican Republic and wrote a goodbye letter to his mother. Another letter said that he had never told anyone of his plans. He received notification that the courts had ruled against him just days before the attacks, but never opened the letter.

All of the guns and weapons Leibacher owned were legally acquired, and he purchased the pump-action shotgun nine days before the shooting, even though he was under surveillance at the time for threatening the bus driver. Despite making some preparations for escape, such as renting a motor scooter, evidence suggests he intended to die in the attack. The day before the attack, Leibacher wrote a letter to the director of his daughter's school. This letter was written in poor English, and read in part:

I am persecuted by the Swiss government for some critics [...] If these things are driving out of control, it is because I am completely tired to fight against that supremacy. I am forced to do the same as they do

== Massacre ==
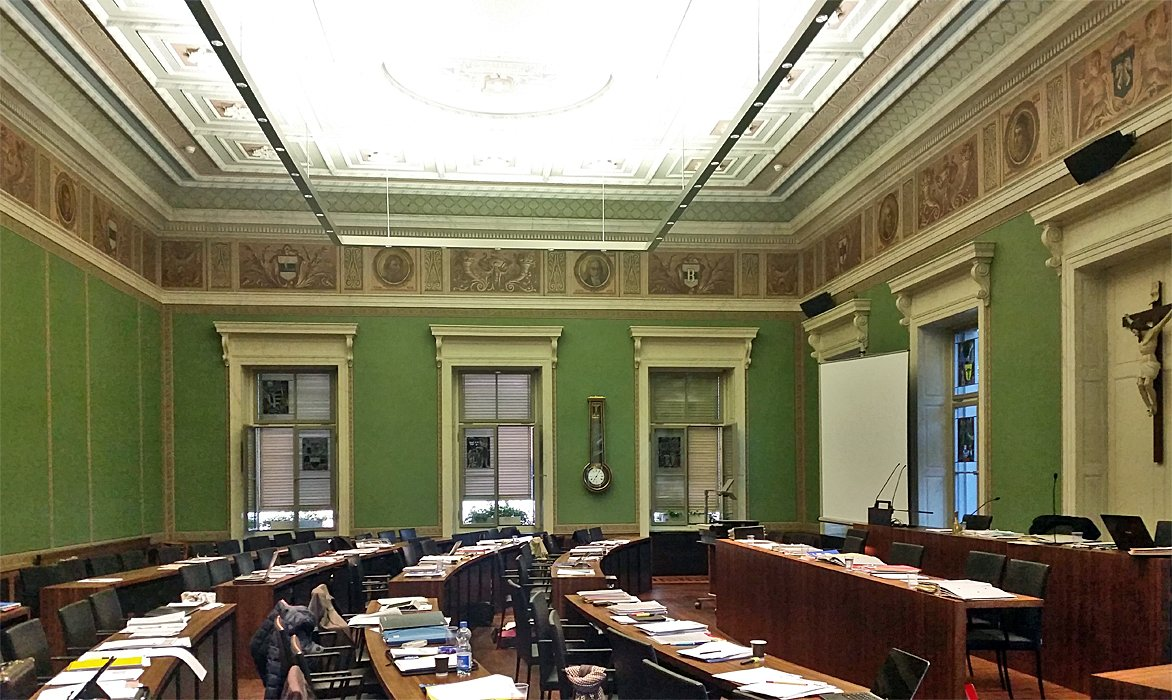
The room where the attack took place, pictured 2015

On 27 September 2001, at 10:30 a.m., Leibacher arrived at the canton's parliament building (German: Parlamentsgebäude) dressed in a homemade police vest and armed with an assault rifle, a shotgun, a revolver, and a pistol (a SIG SG 550, a Remington Model 870 Express, a Smith & Wesson Model 19-7, and a SIG Sauer P232). The SIG SG 550 was a target rifle, not an army rifle. Leibacher entered the building, disguising himself as a police officer. He ran upstairs to the council chamber and yelled "Attention! This is a police operation", and said he would "show them", before opening fire in the assembly hall where 80 members of parliament were meeting. As the hall only had one entrance, they were trapped within. The shooting began at 10:32 a.m.

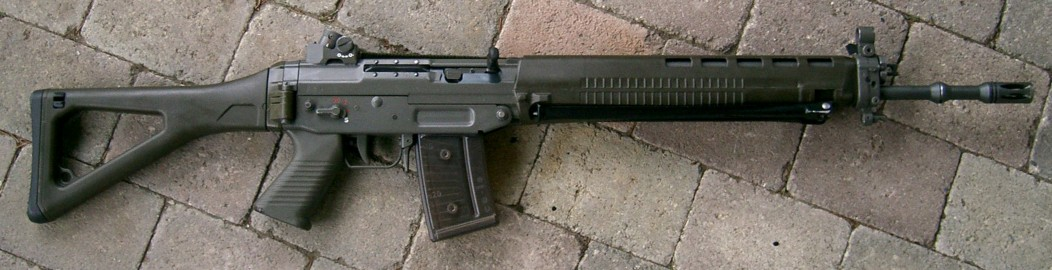

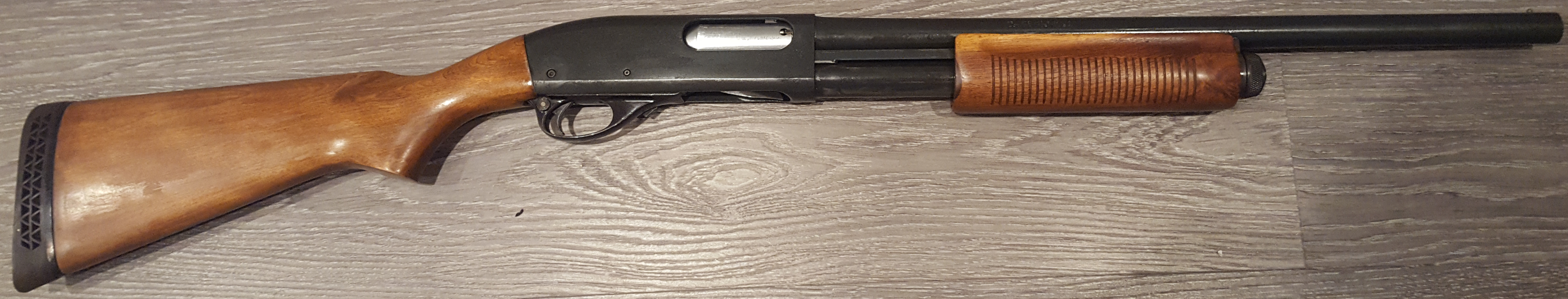
Two long guns of the same kind used in the massacre, the SIG SG 550 assault rifle and Remington Model 870 Express shotgun

He killed three members of the Executive Council (German: Regierungsräte) and eleven members of the legislature (German: Kantonsräte), and wounded 18 politicians and journalists, some seriously. He fired 91 shots. He also repeatedly called for Bisig to reveal himself and called him a coward; Bisig was playing dead on the ground. Those in the hall jumped to the ground to avoid injury; one man jumped out a window, sustaining serious injuries. Leibacher then left the council chamber, but returned to throw a homemade bomb into the chamber. The explosion shattered the hall's windows and broke doors loose of their hinges. Towards the end of the attack, he yelled "now, we deal with 'the complaint Leibacher'", revealing his identity. He then shot himself at about 10:34 a.m. The shooting lasted for 2 minutes and 34 seconds. The whole shooting was caught on a tape recorder that had been running through the meeting.

His main target was Robert Bisig, who was left unharmed and survived the massacre. Leibacher left a suicide note in his car (of which he made 29 copies) titled "Tag des Zornes für die Zuger Mafia" ("transl. Day of Reckoning for the Zug Mafia", or transl. Day of Rage for the Zug Mafia). It contained various allegations against the authorities of the canton, denouncing them as a "Mafia judiciary" that had victimized him through "illegal and criminal means". He also left a copy of the letter inside his apartment. Also in the car was another weapon and a motorcycle outfit. The revolver, also acquired legally, was unused. Around his neck was a statement on a cord that stated he declined medical attention, or the usage of his organs for any purpose. He had a blood alcohol content of 0.48–0.58. The police did not fire any shots in responding to the shooting.

== Aftermath ==
Victims

- President of the Cantonal Parliament
- Herbert Arnet
- Members of the Cantonal Government
- Peter Bossard
- Monika Hutter-Häfliger
- Jean-Paul Flachsmann
- Cantonal councilors
- Martin Döbeli
- Dorly Heimgartner
- Kurt Nussbaumer
- Rolf Nussbaumer
- Konrad Häusler
- Erich Iten
- Karl Gretener
- Willi Wismer
- Heinz Grüter
- Käthi Langenegger

— Source:

Only two of the seven government councilors were still able to work after the shooting: Director of Economic Affairs Robert Bisig and director of finance Ruth Schwerzmann. Director of Security Hanspeter Uster and Director of Education and Culture Walter Suter were injured in hospital. At 4 p.m., Tino Jorio, who remained uninjured, organized an eleven-member task force, which met under his leadership at 8 a.m. the following morning. Bisig and Schwerzmann, together with the executive secretaries, took over the management of the orphaned departments, and parliamentary business was suspended until the end of November. The task force held six meetings and disbanded on 12 October. On 23 October, the government met for the first time in its new form, and on 29 November, the Cantonal Council also resumed its work, now in the large hall of the Zug police building.

Swiss president Moritz Leuenberger ordered the national flag to be flown at half-mast for three days after the incident. The mayor of Zug, Christoph Luchsinger, described the aftermath as "a terrible scene of horror" and the shooting as an "attack on our democracy". After the shooting, the cantonal authorities filed to claim Leibacher's estate, valued at SFr 400,000. One of the injured victims was left paralyzed by the attack. That the attack occurred so shortly after 9/11 likely impacted the amount of attention given to it, though substantial attention was. There was an international reaction, with Pope John Paul II saying a prayer for the victims.

On 1 October, the official funeral service for the victims was held in the Zug parish church of St Michael's. 14 candles were lit for the victims of the shooting. Representatives of the Catholic Church, wanting to uphold the idea of forgiveness, wanted to light a 15th candle for Leibacher. The relatives of the victims opposed this. During the service, Bishop Kurt Koch said: "To light a candle for the perpetrator – I can feel it is still too early for many." He handed the 15th candle to the regional dean of Zug, who lit it a year later together with a Reformed colleague. Many of Leibacher's final actions have been viewed as an example of attacker "final warning" behavior. Leibacher was said by the official report to be fully aware of and responsible for his actions, though afflicted with a personality disorder.

== Legacy ==
The shooting was the first time a Swiss politician was killed since the 19th century. (Note: The last time was in 1890, when state councilor Luigi Rossi was shot dead during a coup.) After the shooting, the furniture in the room where the attack occurred was burned and the layout of the room was redesigned. The canton initially wanted to destroy the building altogether, but this was decided against. On 30 August 2004, a memorial for the shooting was unveiled in Zug, designed by Zug artist Caroline Flueler. The memorial has a green glass plate embedded into the floor, with 14 points of light, representing the 14 victims. During the ten years until his retirement in September 2011, Timo Jorio and his wife Ruth, as well as Landesweibel, accompanied the relatives of those killed and arranged for lawyers to help with legal issues. Jorio used the money from Leibacher's estate to finance part of the victim support. The majority of the compensation came from the state in accordance with the Swiss Victim Support Act.

Two brothers from Zug developed a conspiracy theory that Leibacher had not killed himself and had actually been killed by the police, and that there was a coverup by the government and media to hide this fact. This idea was spread widely by them across the internet and through posters and flyers. They repeatedly filed complaints against the Zug authorities, accusing them of murder and abetting murder. The Zug government then filed a complaint against the men for false accusations. In 2012, the St. Gallen public prosecutor Beat Fehr closed the case after a long investigation, concluding that the investigation was proper and that the allegations by the two men were unfounded. He also closed the complaint by the government against the men, as they had believed their statements to be true.

Several films based on the events were proposed, but an attempt to make a film was repeatedly resisted by the canton, as were research attempts into the shooting. In 2004, during a National League ice hockey game between EV Zug and SC Bern in Zug, fans of Bern taunted and provoked Zug supporters by displaying a large banner celebrating the massacre, adorned with a skull and crossbones alongside the text "Danke Leibacher" (transl. Thanks Leibacher) written across it. SC Bern released an official apology to Zug supporters on behalf of their fans.

=== Policy changes ===
A commissioned psychiatric analysis of Leibacher after the shooting argued that though his behavior was "very peculiar", all the pieces regarding the danger he presented could not have been put together beforehand. The shooting also led to a change in how people perceived as hostile or uttering threats were handled by several cantons. The public prosecution office now assigns a case manager to such people to assess the violence risk by gathering all known information, and such individuals are tracked in databases.

After the shooting, there was a heated debate over many policies. Gun laws in Switzerland remained unchanged, despite the fact that when the shooting had occurred there were already proposed gun reforms. Many statements in the aftermath of Zug about guns did not present widespread gun availability as a social problem, unlike other similar cases. There was no large societal campaign for stricter gun laws, as seen in other countries that had experienced similarly deadly attacks (e.g. the United Kingdom after the Dunblane massacre). The Social Democratic Party of Switzerland (SP) argued for gun reforms in the aftermath, as did the Christian Democratic People's Party (CVP), though the CVP's support for such policies was far less focused and less specific than the SP's. In 2003, Swiss Justice Minister Ruth Metzler proposed that all firearms be registered. That year she was voted out of office, the first time in 131 years that someone in her position had not been re-elected, and the measure was scrapped by her successor Christoph Blocher.

In part due to the attack along with a high rate of gun suicide, as well as the murder of Corinne Rey-Bellet in 2006, a federal referendum was held in 2011 on a popular initiative for stricter gun control, Schutz vor Waffengewalt (lit. 'protection against armed violence'). The proposed policies included the ban of the sale of automatic weapons and pump-action rifles, and that military-issued firearms must be held in army depots. It also proposed a weapons registry. The referendum was rejected by 56.3% of voters. In 2019, a federal referendum implementing the amended EU weapons directive aligned Switzerland with new EU regulations, which were instituted as a response to other terrorist attacks in Europe. The referendum passed with 64% of the vote. It made it harder to obtain assault weapons and easier for the authorities to track weapons.

Instead of gun control, the security of buildings deflected the focus and most of the public attention was on that issue instead. The idea of changing the free access to buildings resulted in criticism, as some believed this would damage the transparency between politicians and the public. Despite this, widespread security changes were enacted. Many local parliaments increased security or installed security measures around and inside of their buildings. Some established a strict access control for visitors and security passes for the politicians and staff.

== See also ==
- 2001 in Switzerland
- List of mass shootings in Switzerland
- List of attacks on legislatures
- Nanterre massacre
- 2024 Parliament of Abkhazia shooting
