= Robert Bisig =

Swiss politician (born 1950)

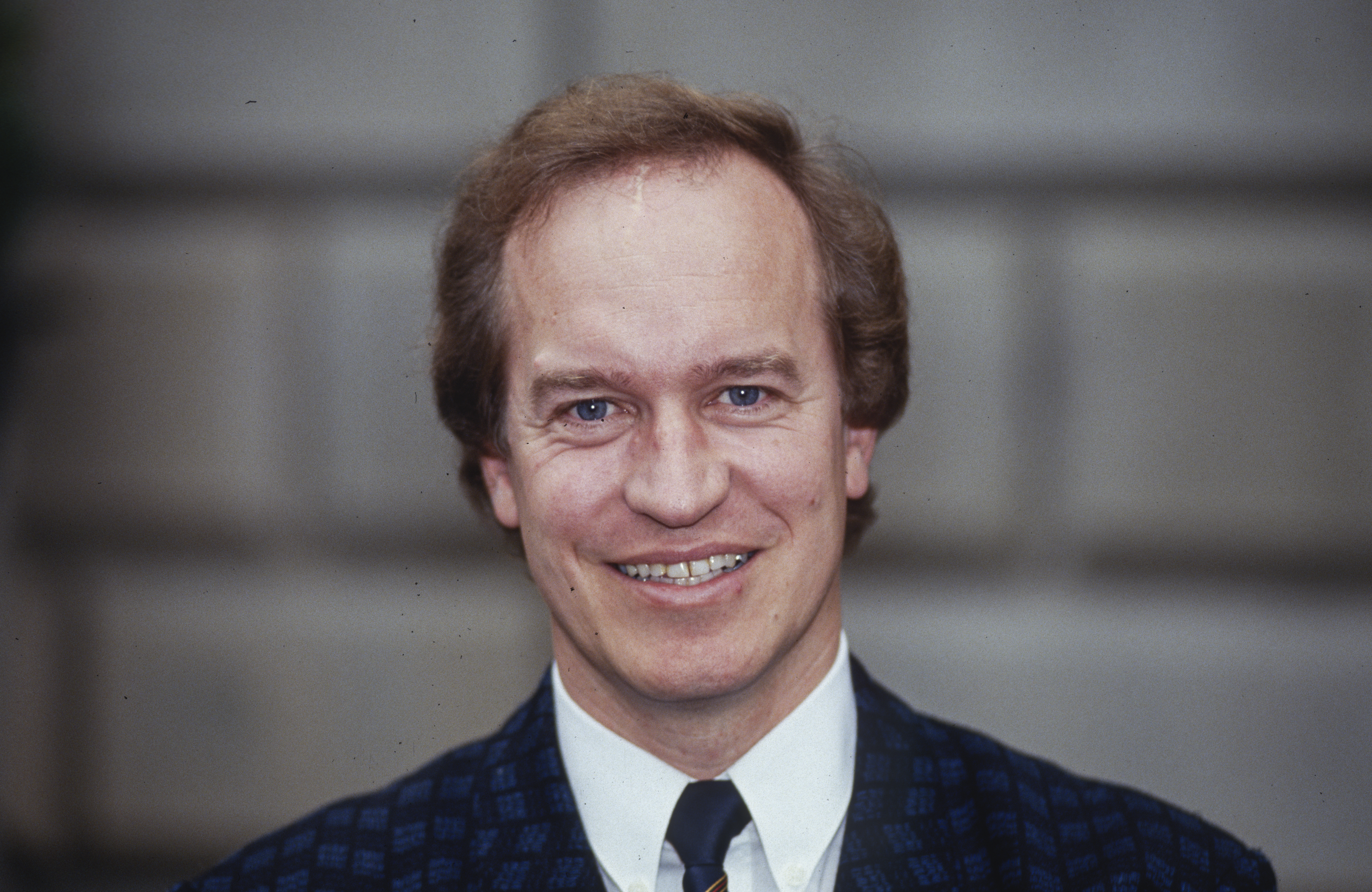
- Robert Bisig in 1986

Personal details
- Born: 31 May 1950 (age 76) Einsiedeln, Canton of Schwyz, Switzerland

Robert Bisig (born 31 May 1950, in Romanshorn, with his place of origin in Einsiedeln, Canton of Schwyz) is a Swiss politician affiliated with the Christian Democratic People's Party (CVP).

== Life and politics ==
Bisig studied law and, after obtaining his bar admission and qualifying as a notary, served as a police judge, youth prosecutor and director of a correctional facility. From 1975 to 1986, he was a member of the Cantonal Council of the Canton of Zug. In 1987, he took office as a member of the Executive Council and Director of Economic Affairs. Robert Bisig is married and has three children. He lives in the municipality of Steinhausen in the Canton of Zug. Between 2012 and 2019, Bisig and his wife lived in the Canton of Appenzell Innerrhoden, his wife's home canton.

For a total of 16 years, Robert Bisig headed the Department of Economic Affairs of the Canton of Zug, and from 1994 to 1998 he presided over the Conference of Cantonal Directors of Economic Affairs. During his time in office, Bisig succeeded in translating pioneering and innovative ideas into practical achievements. These included the opening of the Zug Stadtbahn and the establishment of the Association for Labour Market Measures (Verein für Arbeitsmarktmassnahmen, VAM). By promoting integrated production and organic farming, the Canton of Zug, under Economic Affairs Director Robert Bisig, made pioneering contributions in the field of agriculture. Bisig also successfully introduced legislation to promote affordable housing construction.

Bisig devoted considerable attention to the quality of vocational education and training. In an interview with Zuger Presse in 2002, he commented on this himself: "I am pleased that we have been able to achieve so much in vocational education and training through new infrastructure, new higher technical colleges and universities of applied sciences; many pilot projects have also been launched here regarding the curricula of these institutions".

In 2002, Robert Bisig announced his resignation from the Executive Council. He subsequently took on new professional challenges in the healthcare sector. In 2003, he became Director of Central Services at the Swiss Paraplegic Centre in Nottwil. From 2005 to 2008, he served as CEO of Zug Cantonal Hospital, and from 2009 to 2012 he headed the Directorate Staff at Lucerne Cantonal Hospital.

The Bisig-Ulmann couple frequently spent their leisure time in the Canton of Appenzell Innerrhoden, where they also lived for a period and where Robert Bisig served as departmental secretary of the Department of Economic Affairs until his retirement in 2015.
