= 2011 Swiss gun control initiative =

- 13 February 2011
- Popular initiative from 23 February 2009 'for protection against gun violence'

Results
Choice	Votes	%
Yes	1,083,312	43.70%
No	1,395,812	56.30%
Valid votes	2,479,124	99.12%
Invalid or blank votes	22,136	0.88%
Total votes	2,501,260	100.00%
Registered voters/turnout	5,091,652	49.12%
- Results by canton

A referendum was held in Switzerland on 13 February 2011 on the federal popular initiative "For the protection against gun violence". It was rejected by 56% of voters and a majority of cantons.

== Initiative ==
The initiative foresees that military guns can no longer be kept at home, but must be stored at the arsenal (Zeughaus) instead, that possession of a gun should be linked to a screening of the ability and necessity of the gunholder, and that all guns should be registered. Left-wing parties (SP, Greens, CSP) and the GLP are mostly in favour of the proposal, with right-wing parties (SVP, FDP, CVP, BDP) opposed.

=== Text of law as proposed ===
The Federal Constitution of 18 April 1999 is amended as follows:

Art. 107 Title and paragraph 1

Title

War material

1 Repealed

Art. 118a (new) Protection against violence caused by weapons

1 The Confederation shall issue regulations against the misuse of weapons, weapons accessories and ammunition. To this end, it regulates the acquisition, possession, carrying, use and surrender of weapons, weapons accessories and ammunition.

2 Anyone who intends to acquire, possess, carry, use or hand over a firearm or ammunition must justify a need and have the necessary capabilities. The law regulates the requirements and details, in particular for :

a. professions whose exercise requires the possession of a weapon;

b. the professional trade in weapons;

c. sport shooting;

d. hunting;

e. weapons collections.

3 No person may acquire or possess a particularly dangerous weapon such as an automatic firearm or shotgun for private purposes.

4 Military legislation regulates the use of weapons by military personnel. Outside periods of military service, the firearms of military personnel shall be kept in secure military premises. No firearms are handed over to military personnel leaving the army. The law regulates exceptions, including for licensed marksmen.

5 The Confederation maintains a firearms register.

6 It shall support the Cantons in the organisation of firearms collections.

7 It works at the international level to limit the availability of small arms and light weapons.

== Opinion polls ==
According to polls from January 2011, the initiative was favoured by 45% of respondents, with 34% opposed and a relatively high amount of undecideds at 21%. A second poll from two weeks before the referendum saw a closening of the polls, with 47% to 45% in favour.

== Results ==
More than half, 56.3%, of all voters were against the initiative, with only the cantons of Basel-Stadt, Zurich, Geneva, Jura, Vaud and Neuchâtel in support; this meant the initiative would have narrowly passed in western Switzerland, but clearly failed in the German-speaking parts. In Switzerland, the passing of a constitutional amendment by initiative requires a double majority; not only must a majority of people vote for the amendment but also a majority of cantons give their consent.

Choice	Popular vote		Cantons		
Choice	Votes	%	Full	Half	Total
For	1,083,312	43.70	5	1	5.5
Against	1,395,812	56.30	15	5	17.5
Invalid/blank votes	22,136	–	–	–	–
Total	2,501,260	100	20	6	23
Registered voters/turnout	5,091,652	49.12	–	–	–
Source: Direct Democracy

== See also ==
- Gun politics in Switzerland
