= Romanshorn shooting =

1912 mass shooting in Romanshorn, Switzerland

- Location: Romanshorn, Switzerland
- Date: August 30–31, 1912
- Attack type: Mass murder
- Weapons: Schmidt 1882 Revolver; Schmidt–Rubin 1911 Rifle
- Deaths: 7
- Injuries: 7 (including the perpetrator)
- Perpetrator: Hermann Schwarz

The Romanshorn shooting was an act of mass murder that occurred in the town of Romanshorn, Switzerland, on August 30, 1912. On that evening, Hermann Schwarz, a 25-year-old local resident recently discharged from the army, opened fire at people in the street from the second-story window of his apartment. In the initial shooting and the following siege Schwarz shot a total of twelve men, six of them fatally, before managing to escape into a nearby forest. While police and townsmen engaged in an extensive search operation the gunman killed another person and evaded capture until the next day, when he was shot and wounded and subsequently taken into custody.

In the following months Schwarz was examined by several psychiatrists and was found to have a mental illness, resulting in his acquittal due to insanity. He was ordered to be institutionalized for the rest of his life.

== Perpetrator ==
Hermann Schwarz was born on November 28, 1887, in Märstetten. He had two sisters. When his father died when he was young, he was raised by his mother in Gottshaus. Apparently he was a problematic child, being described as a "plague for his neighbours" and a "burden to his teachers".

Growing older he reportedly was stubborn, lazy and vindictive, always quick to threaten others with destruction. He also engaged in animal cruelty and poaching and was an avid reader of pulp novels.

Schwarz, who was said to have always carried a loaded revolver with him, probably a Schmidt 1882 service revolver, and also had possession of a rifle, probably a Schmidt–Rubin 1911 service rifle, became a member of the Militärschützenverein Märstetten, and used his membership to accumulate large quantities of ammunition by always buying more cartridges than needed for the shooting exercises.

In February 1912 Schwarz, his mother and two sisters moved into a small apartment in Romanshorn, where, at one point, he began stalking a girl. A relative of that girl, an embroiderer named Wesel, reported his intrusive behaviour to the authorities, and asked for police protection when Schwarz threatened to kill him.

== Shooting ==
As a reservist Schwarz was conscripted to a military exercise that was about to begin on August 26, but showing signs of a mental disorder his mother felt inclined to inform the Gemeindeammannamt (Mayor's Office) about his disturbed condition, and urged Gemeindeammann (Mayor) Etter to notify police. Because of that Schwarz was examined by his battalion's physician and was indeed found to be mentally unfit to fulfill his duties, so he was released from military service and sent home again on August 28. Schwarz was left in the possession of his service rifle and revolver, and took them home with him.

Finding out about the reason for his dismissal, Schwarz reportedly became furious and threatened to shoot Etter. During the night he crept around the house of a woman known to him and smashed in a window. Police were alerted about his behaviour and the Bezirksamt (District Office) ordered him to be confined and put under medical observation.

On August 30, at about 4:00 p.m., Schwarz travelled to Amriswil and bought 80 rounds of ammunition. At 6:00 p.m. two police officers were sent to his home in order to arrest him. They encountered Schwarz in the hallway, but he resisted his arrest, threatened the officers with his revolver and, after a short scuffle, managed to escape into his room on the second floor and lock the door.

Anton Fritsch, a butcher's journeyman living in the same building, was called to assist the officers, but when he tried to break into the gunman's refuge, Schwarz fired through the door, hitting him in the chest four times. As nobody dared to recover him, Fritsch was left bleeding to death. Attracted by the gunshots, people began gathering around the building, whereupon Schwarz started shooting from a window. He shot two people trying to enter. Escaped at about 11:30 p.m. A police officer watched him, shot at him three times, but missed.

Schwarz killed railway employee/collier Franz Xaver Weber with a shot through the heart, as well as a 15-year-old Italian boy, Biagio Pedrollo, who was pushing his bicycle along the street, with shots in the heart and face. He also injured a letter carrier named Hugelshofer, with a shot through the arm, apparently when firing at Etter, who was standing nearby.

Hermann then fatally wounded typesetter Rudolf Thommen with a shot through the lung, then killed inn keeper Friedrich Keller. Forty armed people gathered and fired at the building.

Some members of the local Schützenverein entered the building, Schwarz shot at them barricaded behind a wardrobe, killing Anton Fritsch (lived in the building so killed before?) and Friedrich Keller. He also injured police officer Staheli with a shot in the knee, Heizer shot in arm, manager of gas plant shot in leg, Thommen shot in lung, Italian shot in hip. Escaped 12:30 p.m.

The shooting continued until 11 p.m. At about 12:30 a.m. the building was stormed, though Schwarz had escaped by climbing down a tree or ladder in the backyard. He left his rifle behind, but took the revolver with him. Twelve police officers with dogs began searching for him the next day.

Schwarz escaped into a nearby forest at about 9:30 p.m., from where he continued shooting. Up to his escape he had fired more than 100 times. One of the victims were possibly shot by those firing at the building. Fritsch was killed with four shots, 11 bullets recovered from Keller's body, apparently none of them fired from the gunman's rifle.

=== Chase and arrest ===
The next day at 10:30 a.m., a meeting was held, police and firefighters shall comb the forest. Schwartz was also chased by people with bloodhounds. Armed citizens joined the search as well. Two firefighters stayed back nearby a firing range where Schwarz was hiding in a trench. Around 4:30 p.m. one of the firefighters saw Schwarz and fired shots at him from cover. Schwarz killed the other one standing in the open, then escaped. At 7:05 p.m., Schwarz was located again on a meadow near the shooting range, pursued by firefighters and police, and shot by police. Schwartz was incapacitated with two shots, in his arm and leg, his neck was grazed by another shot. He still had 100 rounds of ammunition for his rifle and 150 rounds for his revolver. Schwarz was pronounced captured on August 31 later that evening.

A crowd of 1000 people escorted him to the police building in Romanshorn and threatened to lynch him. Schwartz was examined by 5 doctors in Münsterlingen found to be coherent and sane. He then uttered his wish to be shot dead but later began to show remorse and begged not to be shot.

In the morning hours of September 4 Schwarz was transferred to asylum in Münsterlingen for further observation.

=== Victims ===
- Tommaso Dal Farra, 68, died September 1
- Philipp Enderli, 37
- Anton Fritsch, 25
- Friedrich Keller, 39
- Biagio Pedrollo, 15
- Rudolf Thommen, 37
- Franz Xaver Weber, 46
- Injured: Bohrer, Jakob Gsell (shoulder), Hugelshofer, Stäheli (knee)

== Aftermath ==
Schwarz was found to have auditory hallucinations and paranoia and was diagnosed with prodromal schizophrenia. During his time in asylum, condition deteriorated, manifesting in a psychosis.

People who knew him stated they didn't believe he was insane but was inspired by pulp novels to commit his deed, and that the only reason for declaring him insane was because he was an interesting case.

On February 20, 1913, court found him to be insane, was acquitted and ordered to be institutionalised for the rest of his life.

After examinations by psychiatrists in Münsterlingen and Münsingen certified his insanity the legal prosecution of Schwarz was discontinued and his lifelong internment in the asylum in Münsterlingen was ordered.

The Carnegie Hero Fund awarded several people with the Carnegie Medal of Honor for their efforts in catching the gunman and tending the wounded. It also made a payment of 2000 francs to a fund created for aiding the victims and their families.

== See also ==
- Zug massacre
