= Firearms regulation in Switzerland =

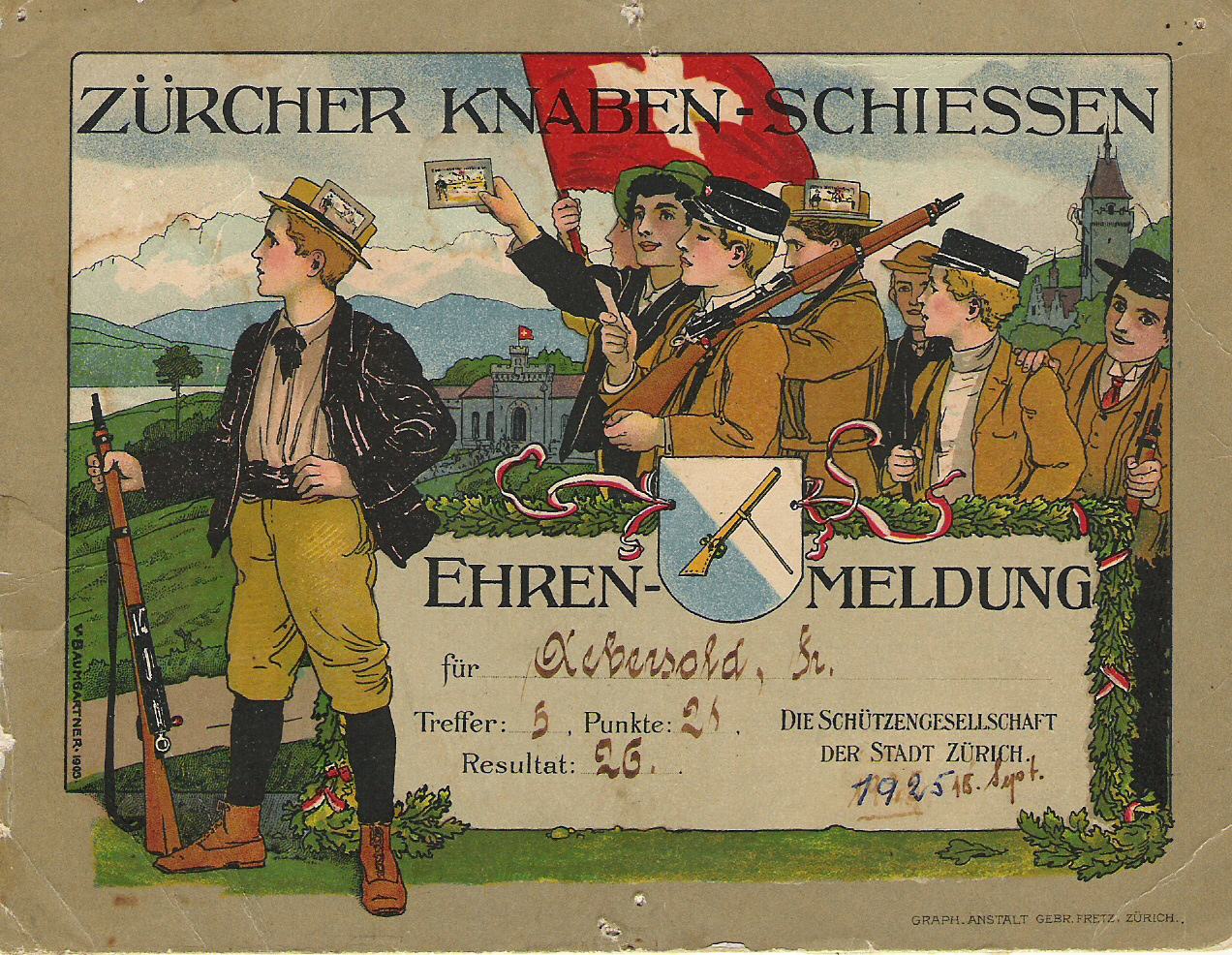
1925 Knabenschiessen certificate of participation. Target shooting is one of the most popular sports in Switzerland and considered one of the country's national sports.

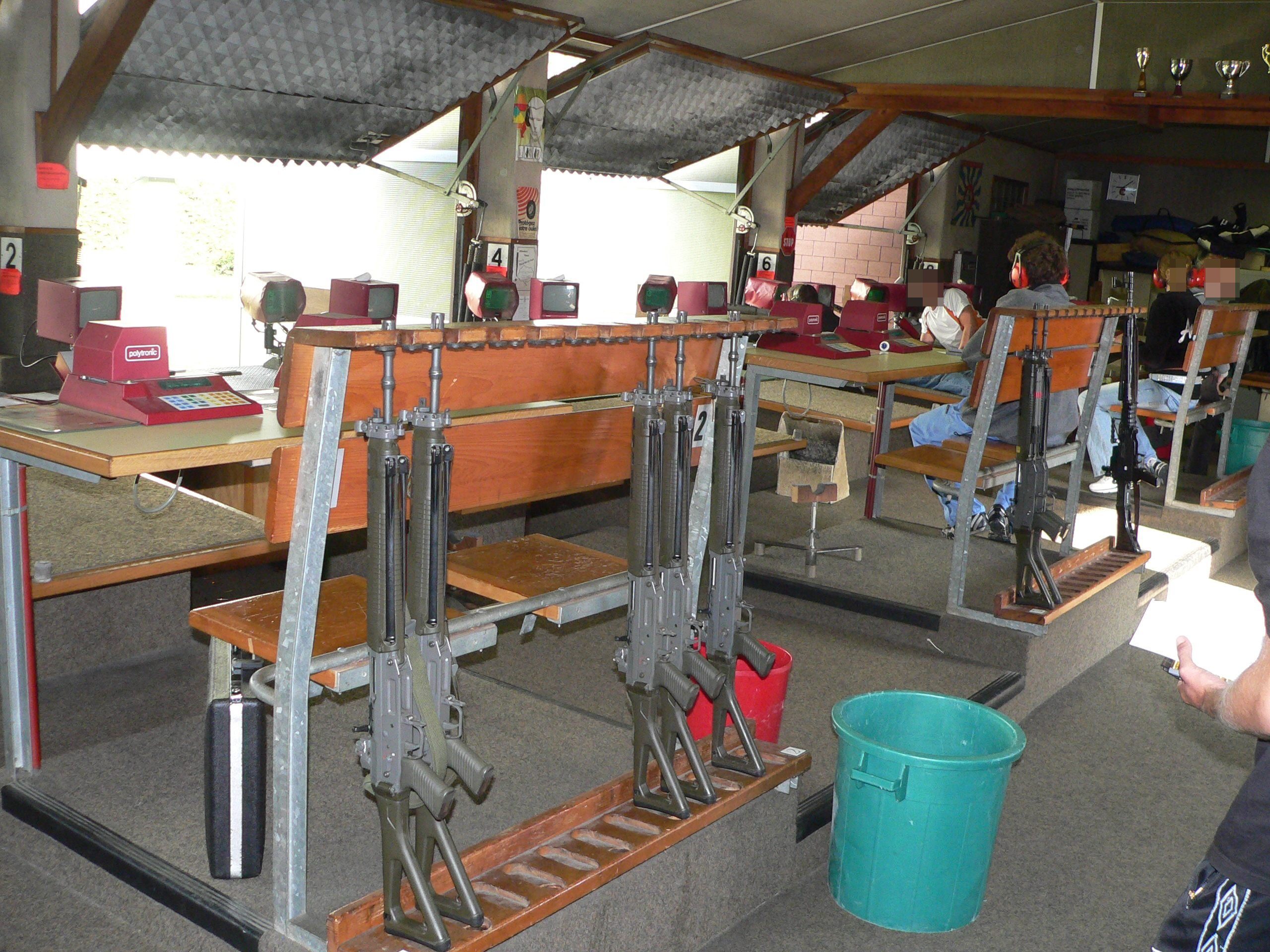
The federal shooting range of Versoix, Switzerland; people come to such ranges to complete mandatory training (Obligatorischeschiessen) with service arms, or to shoot for sport and competition.

Firearms regulation in Switzerland allows the acquisition of semi-automatic, and – with a may-issue permit – fully automatic firearms, by Swiss citizens and foreigners with or without permanent residence. (Note: The law of 1997 (SR 514.54) made explicit provision for the Federal Council to restrict gun ownership by nationality (art. 7 WG/LArm). SR 514.541 art. 12, passed in 2008, amended in 2014, explicitly prohibits the acquisition, possession, offering, brokering and disposal of weapons, essential parts of weapons, specially designed weapon components, weapon accessories, ammunition or parts of ammunition, as well as the carrying and firing of firearms to nationals of eight states unless they ask for an exceptional authorization to the state: Serbia, Bosnia and Herzegovina, Kosovo, North Macedonia, Turkey, Sri Lanka, Algeria and Albania.) The laws pertaining to the acquisition of firearms in Switzerland are amongst the most liberal in the world, as well as being the most permissive in Europe. Swiss gun laws are primarily about the acquisition of arms, and not ownership. As such a license is not required to own a gun by itself, but a shall-issue permit is required to purchase most types of firearms. Bolt-action rifles, break-actions and hunting rifles do not require an acquisition permit, and can be acquired with just a record extract. An explicit reason must be submitted to be issued an acquisition permit for handguns or semi-automatics unless the reason is sport-shooting, hunting or collecting. Permits for concealed carrying in public are issued sparingly. (Note: SR 514.54 art. 27 § 4. No carry permit is necessary for hunting rifles carried by registered hunters with a hunting licence in the context of hunting or game-keeping, and historical firearms carried in the context of re-enactment or memorial events. Justifiable transport of unloaded firearms is regulated in art. 28.) The acquisition of fully automatic weapons, suppressors and target lasers requires special permits issued by the cantonal firearms office. Police use of hollow point ammunition is limited to special situations.

The applicable federal legislations are SR 514.54 Federal Law on Weapons, Weapon Equipment and Ammunition (German: Waffengesetz, WG, French: Loi sur les armes, LArm, Italian: Legge sulle armi, LArm) of 20 June 1997 (current edition of 15 August 2019), and SR 514.541 Ordinance on Weapons, Armament Accessories and Ammunition (German: Waffenverordnung, WV, French: Ordonnance sur les armes, OArm, Italian: Ordinanza sulle armi, OArm) of 2 July 2008 (current edition of 15 August 2019). The Weapons Law recognises a qualified "right to acquire, possess and carry arms". (Note: "Art. 3 Recht auf Waffenerwerb, Waffenbesitz und Waffentragen: Das Recht auf Waffenerwerb, Waffenbesitz und Waffentragen ist im Rahmen dieses Gesetzes gewährleistet." (The right to acquire, possess and carry arms is guaranteed in the framework of this law.))

Swiss gun culture has emerged from a long tradition of shooting (tirs), which served as a formative element of national identity in the post-Napoleonic Restoration of the Confederacy, and the long-standing practice of a militia organization of the Swiss Army in which soldiers' service rifles are usually stored privately at their homes (it became the choice of the soldier in 2010). What started as a gun culture centered around defense of the country through military duty also became a target shooting and collecting one. In addition to this, many cantons (notably the alpine cantons of Grisons and Valais) have strong traditions of hunting (see #Gun culture in Switzerland), accounting for a large but unknown number of privately held hunting rifles, as only weapons acquired since 2008 are registered. However, in a 2019 referendum voters opted to conform with European Union regulations which restrict the acquisition of semi-automatic firearms with high-capacity magazines. A permit for semi-automatic firearms equipped with high-capacity magazines is issued to anyone fulfilling article 8 of the Weapons Act under the promise they will show after five and ten years that they are a member of a shooting club, or that they used a firearm at least once a year within that five and ten years period for their first permit of the kind or to weapons collectors. The law on the acquisition of a high-capacity magazine by itself did not change.

== Number of guns in circulation ==
Switzerland has a relatively high gun ownership rate. There are no official statistics, and estimates vary considerably.

The 2017 report from Small Arms Survey has estimated that the number of civilian-held firearms in Switzerland is 2,332,000, which given a population of 8.4 million, corresponds to a gun ownership of around 27.6 guns per 100 residents. Other estimates place the number of privately held firearms upwards to a high total of 4,500,000, giving the nation an estimate of 54.5 guns per 100 people in 2017.

The International Crime Victims Survey conducted in 2004-05 reported that approximately 28.6% of all households in Switzerland owned firearms and 10.3% owned handguns, giving Switzerland the second-highest percentage of firearm ownership in Europe. A recent study by the Zurich University of Applied Sciences released in 2023 revealed that the most commonly owned guns are handguns (caliber>.22lr) (85%) with semi-automatic rifles in close second (76%).

When Switzerland joined the Schengen Information System in 2008, it was forced to introduce a registry for firearms, though only those that changed hands since are registered, and no central registry was created. However, multiple proposals have been submitted over the years and most recently, a proposal by Green Party Marionna Schlatter to introduce a central registry was rejected by the Parliament on the 5th of March 2024. Consequently, each canton is still responsible for its registry.

The number of registered firearms in those databases was reported as 876,000 as of August 2017 which given a population of 8.4 million corresponds to around 10.3 registered guns per 100 residents.

== Regulation ==
Switzerland's Weapons Law (WG, LArm) and Weapons Act (WV, OArm) has been revised to accede to the Schengen Treaty effective 12 December 2008, and modified in 2019 after a referendum from the Swiss population to implement the European Firearms Directive which was added in the Schengen agreement. The Act on Personal Military Equipment (VPAA, OEPM) governs the handling of military equipment, and in particular the handling of personal weapons by military personnel.

The law is applied to the following weapons:

- Firearms, such as pistols, revolvers, rifles, pump guns (German: Vorderschaftrepetierer), lever-action rifles, self-loading guns (shotguns and rifles).
- Air and CO_{2} guns with a muzzle energy of at least 7.5 joules, or if there is risk of confusion with a firearm.
- Imitation, blank firing guns (German: Schreckschuss) and air-soft guns when there is risk of confusion with a firearm.
- Butterfly knives, throwing knives, switchblade or automatic knives with total length greater than 12 cm and blade length greater than 5 cm.
- Daggers with a symmetrical blade less than 30 cm.
- Devices that are intended to hurt people such as batons (German: Schlagrute), throwing star, brass knuckles, slings with armrest.
- Electric shock devices and spray products with irritants in Annex 2 weapons ordinance (WV/OArm), except for pepper spray.

Generally prohibited weapons are:

- Automatic firearms and military launching devices for ammunition, for projectiles or for missiles that have an explosive effect, and their essential or specially designed components.
- Automatic firearms modified to semi-automatic firearms, and their essential components; the foregoing does not apply to Swiss army firearms the ownership of which is acquired by the holder directly from the military authorities, and to components essential for maintaining the functionality of such weapons
- the following semi-automatic centrefire weapons:
  - Handguns equipped with a high-capacity loading device
  - Shoulderable firearms equipped with a high-capacity loading device
- Semi-automatic shoulderable firearms that may be shortened by means of a folding or telescopic shaft or without auxiliary means to a length of less than 60 cm, without losing any functionality
- Firearms that resemble an article of everyday use and their essential components;
- Grenade launchers in accordance with Article 4 paragraph 2 letter c
- Laser devices, night-vision devices, silencers and grenade launchers as an addition to a firearm.
- Automatic knives with a blade of more than 5 cm and a total length of more than 12 cm.
- Butterfly knives with a blade of more than 5 cm and a total length of more than 12 cm.
- Throwing knives; regardless of the shape and size.
- Symmetrical daggers where blade length is less than 30 cm.
- Brass knuckles.
- Shock rods or stun guns.
- Throwing stars.
- Buttstock-equipped slingshots (German: Schleudern mit Armstütze).
- Tasers.
- Hidden firearms that imitate an object of utility, such as shooting phones.

=== Acquisition ===
==== Buying guns ====
In order to purchase most weapons, the purchaser must obtain a weapon acquisition permit (art. 8 WG/LArm). Swiss citizens and foreigners with a C permit over the age of 18 who are not under a curator nor identified as being a danger for themselves or others, and who do not have a criminal record with a conviction for a violent crime or of several convictions as long as they haven't been written out can request such a permit. Foreign nationals who do not have a settlement permit but who are resident in Switzerland must present the competent cantonal authority with an official attestation from their home country confirming they are authorised to acquire the weapon or essential weapon component in that country in order to buy (art. 9a WG/LArm). Foreigners with sole citizenship to the following countries are explicitly excluded from the right to buy, sell and own weapons and their parts unless they ask for an exceptional authorization to the state: Serbia, Bosnia and Herzegovina, Kosovo, North Macedonia, Turkey, Sri Lanka, Algeria and Albania. The following information must be provided to the cantonal weapon bureau together with the weapon application form (art. 15 WV/OArm):

- valid official identification or passport copy.
- official attestation as defined in art. 9a WG/LArm (for foreign nationals who do not have a settlement permit but who are resident in Switzerland or persons resident abroad).

For each transfer of a weapon or an essential weapon component without a weapons acquisition permit (art. 10 WG/LArm), a written contract must be concluded. Each Party shall keep them for at least ten years. The contract must include the following information (art. 11 WG/LArm):

- Family name, first name, birth date, residence address and signature of the person who sells the weapon or essential weapon component.
- Family name, first name, birth date, residence address and signature of the person who purchases the weapon or an essential weapon component.
- Kind of weapon, manufacturer or producer, label, caliber, weapon number, and date and place of transfer.
- Type and number of the official identification of the person who acquires the weapon or the essential weapon component.
- and an indication of the processing of personal data in connection with the contract in accordance with the privacy policy of the Federation or the cantons, if firearms are transmitted.

This information must be sent within 30 days to the cantonal weapon registration bureau, where the weapon holders are registered, though CO_{2} and airsoft guns are not concerned by this (art. 11 WGLArm)

===== Categories =====
====== Antique firearms ======
The following weapons are governed solely by Articles 27 (carrying) and 28 (transportation) (art. 2 WG/LArm):

- Antique weapons are defined as firearms that were manufactured before 1870

====== No acquisition permit needed ======
The following weapons can be acquired without acquisition permits (art. 10 WG/LArm):

- single-shot and multi-barrel hunting rifles, and replicas of single-shot muzzle loaders;
- manual repetition rifles designated by the Federal Council and typically used for off-duty and target shooting by shooting clubs recognised under the Armed Forces Act of 3 February 1995 and for hunting purposes in Switzerland;
- single-shot rabbit slayers;
- compressed air and CO_{2} weapons that develop a muzzle energy of at least 7.5 joules or that can be mistaken for real firearms due to their appearance;
- imitation, blank cartridge and airsoft weapons that can be mistaken for real firearms due to their appearance

====== Shall-issue acquisition permit ======
The following weapons can be acquired with a shall-issue acquisition permit (art. 8 WG/LArm):

- the following semi-automatic centrefire weapons:
  - Handguns equipped with a low-capacity loading device (20 or less)
  - Shoulderable firearms equipped with a low-capacity loading device (10 or less)
- Revolvers
- Lever-action rifles
- Pump-action rifles
- Self-loading shotgun with a capacity of 10 or less

====== May-issue exceptional acquisition permit ======
The following weapons can be acquired with a may-issue acquisition permit that can be issued for professional requirements, in particular with regard to carrying out protection duties, such as protecting persons, critical infrastructure or the transport of valuables; recreational target shooting; collecting; National defence requirements; Educational, cultural, research or historical purposes (art. 28c WG/LArm):

- Automatic firearms and military launching devices for ammunition, for projectiles or for missiles that have an explosive effect, and their essential or specially designed components.
- Automatic firearms modified to semi-automatic firearms, and their essential components; the foregoing does not apply to Swiss army firearms the ownership of which is acquired by the holder directly from the military authorities, and to components essential for maintaining the functionality of such weapons
- the following semi-automatic centrefire weapons:
  - Handguns equipped with a high-capacity loading device (21 or more)
  - Shoulderable firearms equipped with a high-capacity loading device (11 or more)
- Semi-automatic shoulderable firearms that may be shortened by means of a folding or telescopic shaft or without auxiliary means to a length of less than 60 cm, without losing any functionality
- Firearms that resemble an article of everyday use and their essential components;
- Grenade launchers in accordance with Article 4 paragraph 2 letter c

====== Shall-issue exceptional acquisition permit for sport shooters ======
The following weapons from the generally prohibited category as well as weapon accessories can be bought with a shall-issue exceptional permit for sport shooter; proof of regular use (usage of a gun 5 times in 5 years) or membership of a club needs to be provided at the 5 and 10 years after the permit was issued. This verification is to be done only for the first weapon purchased with that kind of permit (art. 28d WG/LArm & art. 13c WV/OArm):

- Automatic firearms modified to semi-automatic firearms, and their essential components; the foregoing does not apply to Swiss army firearms the ownership of which is acquired by the holder directly from the military authorities, and to components essential for maintaining the functionality of such weapons
- the following semi-automatic centrefire weapons:
  - Handguns equipped with a high-capacity loading device (21 or more)
  - Shoulderable firearms equipped with a high-capacity loading device (11 or more)

====== May-issue exceptional acquisition permit for collectors ======
The following weapons from the generally prohibited category can be bought with a may-issue exceptional permit for collectors with proof that they are kept in a safe place and protected from access by unauthorised third persons (art. 28e WG/LArm):

- Automatic firearms and military launching devices for ammunition, for projectiles or for missiles that have an explosive effect, and their essential or specially designed components.
- Automatic firearms modified to semi-automatic firearms, and their essential components; the foregoing does not apply to Swiss army firearms the ownership of which is acquired by the holder directly from the military authorities, and to components essential for maintaining the functionality of such weapons
- the following semi-automatic centrefire weapons:
  - Handguns equipped with a high-capacity loading device (21 or more)
  - Shoulderable firearms equipped with a high-capacity loading device (11 or more)
- Semi-automatic shoulderable firearms that may be shortened by means of a folding or telescopic shaft or without auxiliary means to a length of less than 60 cm, without losing any functionality

====== May-issue exceptional acquisition permit for weapons other than firearms and their accessories ======
The following weapons can be bought with a regular may-issue exceptional acquisition permit for professional requirements, use for industrial purposes, compensating for physical handicaps, or collecting (art. 28b WG/LArm):

- Knives and daggers in accordance with Article 4 paragraph 1 letter c;
- Striking and throwing devices in accordance with Article 4 paragraph 1 letter d, with the exception of batons;
- Electrical shock devices in accordance with Article 4 paragraph 1 letter e;
- Weapon accessories in accordance with Article 4 paragraph 2.

==== Buying ammunition ====
In order to purchase ammunition, the buyer must fulfill the same legal rules that apply when buying guns (Note: buyer must be over the age of 18, not under a curator nor identified as being a danger for themselves or others, and don't have a criminal record with a conviction for a violent crime or of several convictions as long as they haven't been written out.) (art. 15 WG/LArm). Foreigners with sole citizenship to the following countries are explicitly excluded from the right to buy and own ammunition: Serbia, Bosnia and Herzegovina, Kosovo, North Macedonia, Turkey, Sri Lanka, Algeria and Albania.

The buyer must provide the following information to the seller (art. 15, 16 WG/LArm; art. 24 WV/OArm):

- a passport or other valid official identification (the holder must be over 18 years of age) (art. 10a WG/LArm).
- a copy of their criminal record not older than 3 months, a weapons acquisition permit which isn't older than 2 years, or a valid European Firearms Pass, if asked by the seller (art. 24 § 3 WV/OArm).

However, ammunition can be freely acquired during shooting events and range practice. Any person who has not yet reached the age of 18 may freely acquire ammunition if it is used for shooting immediately and under supervision (art. 16 § 1 & 2 WG/LArm)

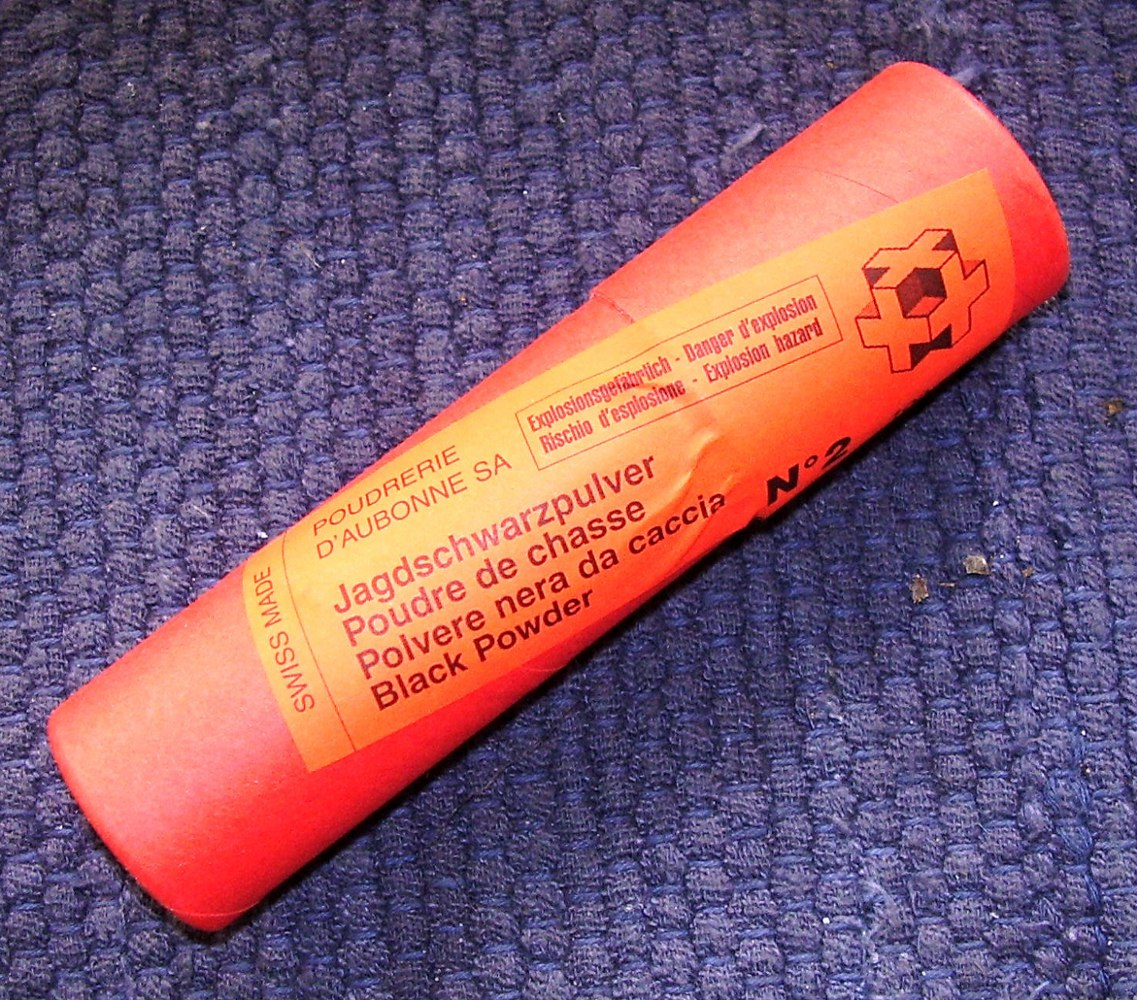
A Swiss 100 gram black powder container.

The acquisition and possession of the following ammunition is generally prohibited but can be acquired for reasons such as industrial purposes, hunting or collecting (art. 26 WV):

- Armour-piercing bullets.
- Ammunition with projectile containing an explosive or incendiary device.
- Ammunition with one or more projectiles releasing substances which damage the health of people in the long run, particularly those mentioned in annex 2 of the WV/OArm.
- Ammunition, missiles and missile launchers for military explosive.
- Ammunition with projectiles for transmitting electric shocks.
- Ammunition for handguns which may cause deformations.

Reloading of ammunition is allowed (art. 19 § 4 WG/LArm)

While the Swiss Weapons Act and its Ordinance don't limit the quantity of ammunition one can own and store, cantonal ordinances on regulations on preventive fire protection may limit the storage without appropriate paperwork. Zürich, for instance, limits the storage to 300kg of ammunition without permitting from the cantonal fire police (VVB art. F § 17 let. e)

=== Storage ===
Storage of weapons, essential weapon components, ammunition and ammunition components is regulated as follows (art. 26 WG/LArm):

- Weapons, essential weapon components, ammunition and ammunition components must be kept in a safe place and protected from access by unauthorised third persons.
- The loss of a weapon must be reported to the police immediately.

Further requirements are needed in regard to automatic firearms or firearms that have been converted to semi-automatic (art. 47 WV/OArm):

- The bolt-carrier-group of an automatic firearm or automatic firearm converted to a semi-automatic firearm must be kept separate from the rest of the firearm and locked.

=== Carrying guns ===
To carry a firearm in public or outdoors (and for a militia member to carry a firearm other than his issued weapons while off-duty), a person must have a gun carrying permit (German: Waffentragbewilligung, French: permis de port d'armes, Italian: permesso di porto di armi; art. 27 WG/LArm), which in most cases is issued only to private citizens working in occupations such as security. It is, however, quite common to see a person in military service or a sport shooter to be en route with his rifle, albeit unloaded. The issue of such exceptional permits is extremely selective (see #Conditions_for_obtaining_a_Carrying_Permit).

However, it is permissible to carry firearms in public or outdoors if the holder (art. 27 § 4 WG/LArm):

- Has a valid hunting license and is carrying the firearm for hunting.
- Is participating in a demonstration and is carrying the firearm in reference to a historical event.
- Is participating in a shooting competition for air-soft guns, provided that the competition has a secure perimeter.
- Is an airport security officer for an authorized country, a border patrol officer, or a game warden, who is carrying the firearm in the course of their employment.

Furthermore, any licensed holder of a gun may transport an unloaded firearm for special situations (see #Transporting guns).

==== Conditions for obtaining a Carrying Permit ====
There are three conditions (art. 27 § 2 WG/LArm):

- fulfilling the conditions for a buying permit (see section above).
- stating plausibly the need to carry firearms to protect oneself, other people, or real property from a specified danger.
- passing an examination proving both weapon handling skills and knowledge regarding the lawful use of the weapon.

The carrying permit remains valid for a term of five years (unless otherwise surrendered or revoked), and applies only to the type of firearm for which the permit was issued. Additional constraints may be invoked to modify any specific permit (art. 27 § 3 WG/LArm).

However, a person who wants to renew his or her firearms license does not need to retake the practical test if the test was passed less than three years ago. They do not need to retake the theory test on the same condition, provided that the legal provisions have not been significantly changed and that there is no doubt that they have sufficient knowledge of the legal conditions for using a weapon (art. 48 § 4 WV/OArm).

=== Transporting guns ===
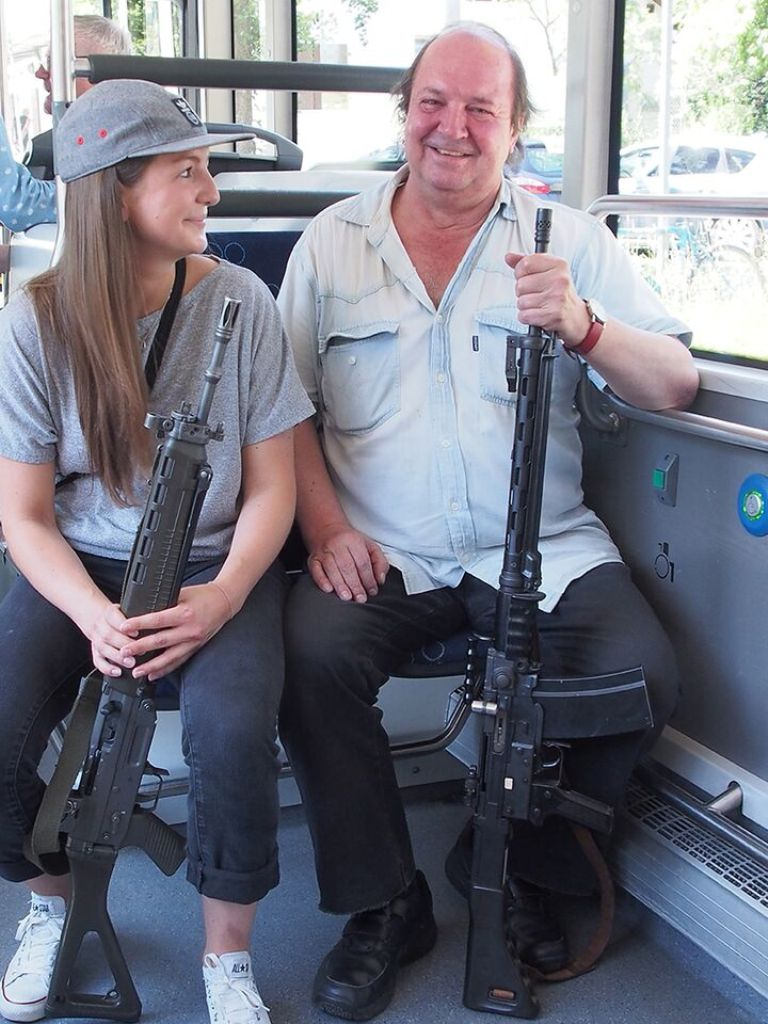
Two sport shooters transporting a SIG550 and SIG510 in a bus

Guns may be transported in public as long as an appropriate justification is present. This means to transport a gun in public, the following requirements apply (art. 28 WG/LArm):

- The gun must be unloaded and transported separately from any ammunition, with no ammunition being transported in a magazine.
- The transport must be by a reasonable route and requires a valid purpose, most notably:
  - To or from courses or exercises in marksmanship, hunting or for military purposes.
  - To or from an army warehouse.
  - To show the gun to a possible buyer.
  - To or from a holder of a valid arms trade permit.
  - To or from a specific event, e.g. gun shows.
  - During a change of residence.

It is, however, worth mentioning that in 2015, a court deemed a 14-hour journey home from the seller (including a night at the bar) as appropriate transport after an appeal.

== Army-issued arms and ammunition collection ==
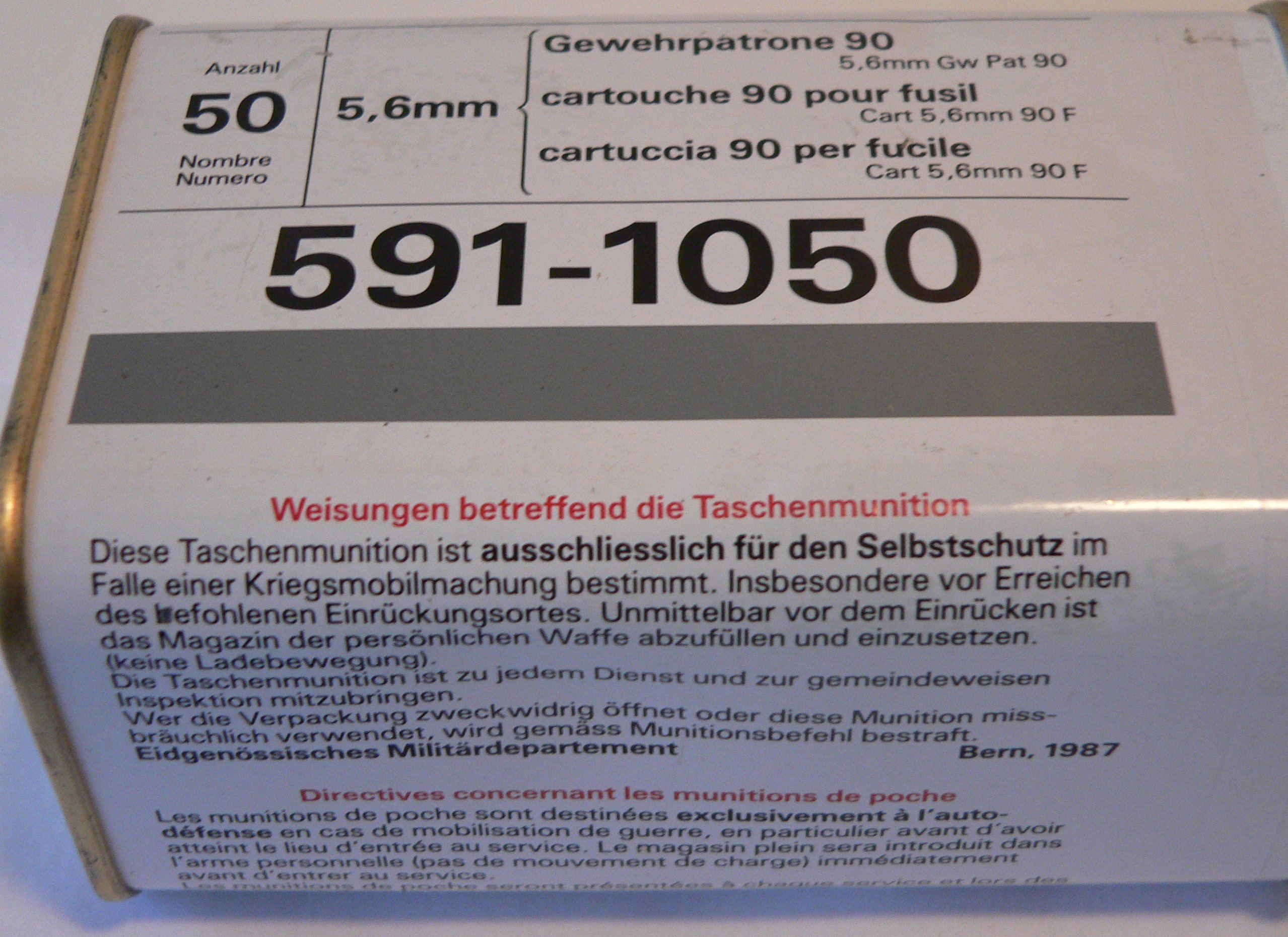
Ready ammunition of the Swiss Army. Soldiers equipped with the Sig 550 assault rifle used to be issued 50 rounds of ammunition in a sealed can, to be opened only upon alert and for use while en route to join their unit. This practice was stopped in 2007. This however does not apply towards private ownership of ammunition.

The Swiss army has long been a militia trained and structured to rapidly respond against foreign aggression. Swiss males grow up expecting to undergo basic military training, usually at age 20 in the recruit school, the basic-training camp, after which Swiss men remain part of the "militia" in reserve capacity usually until age 30 (age 34 for officers).

Before 2007, members of the Swiss Militia were supplied with 50 rounds of ammunition for their military weapon in a sealed ammo box which was audited by the army during repetition courses (Pocket ammunition). This was so that, in the case of an emergency, the militia could respond quickly.

In December 2007, the Swiss Federal Council decided that the distribution of ammunition to soldiers would stop and that previously issued ammo would be returned. By March 2011, more than 99% of the ammo has been received. Only 2,000 specialist militia members (who protect airports and other sites of particular sensitivity) are permitted to keep their military-issued ammunition at home. The rest of the militia get their ammunition from their military armoury in the event of an emergency. This followed the murder of Swiss ski champion Corinne Rey-Bellet by her husband, who used his military issued weapon in the killing.

When their period of service has ended, militiamen have the choice of buying their personal Stgw 90 after it has been converted to semi-automatic and keeping other selected items of their equipment. However, keeping the firearms after the end of service requires a weapon acquisition permit and in the case of the rifle to have participated in four federal exercises (repetition shootings (obligatorische Programm) and Feldschiessen) in the last three years of service (art. 29 & 30 VPAA/OEPM).

The government sponsors training with rifles and shooting in competitions for interested adolescents, both male and female (see #Gun_culture_in_Switzerland). The sale of military-issued ammunition, including Gw Pat.90 rounds for army-issued assault rifles, is subsidized by the Swiss government and made available at the many Federal Council licensed shooting ranges. That ammunition sold at ranges to minors must be immediately used there under supervision (art. 16 WG/LArm).

The Swiss Army maintains tightened adherence to high standards of lawful military conduct. In 2005, for example, when the Swiss prosecuted recruits who had reenacted the torture scenes of Abu Ghraib, one of the charges was improper use of service weapons.

== Gun culture in Switzerland ==
Switzerland has a strong gun culture compared to other countries in the world. Recreational shooting is widespread in Switzerland. Practice with guns is a popular form of recreation, and is encouraged by the government, particularly for the members of the militia.

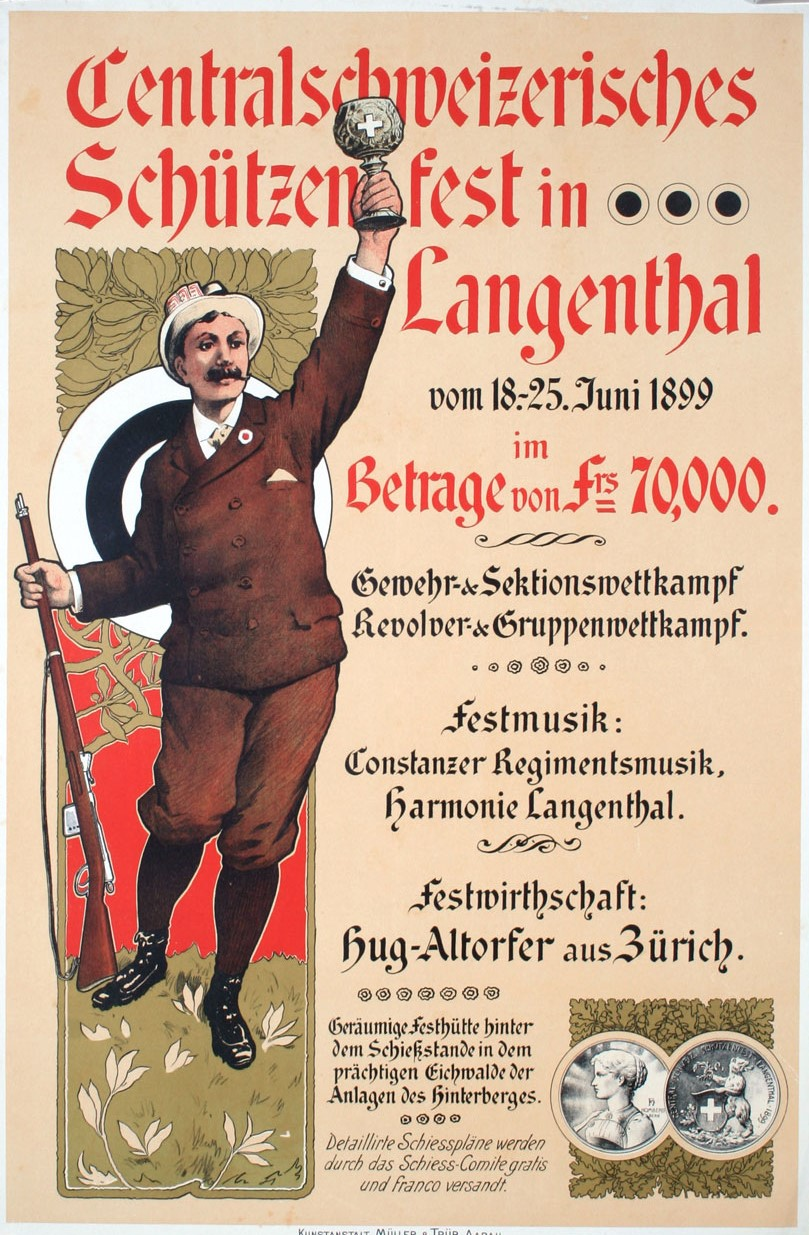
Poster advertising the 1899 Langenthal schützenfest

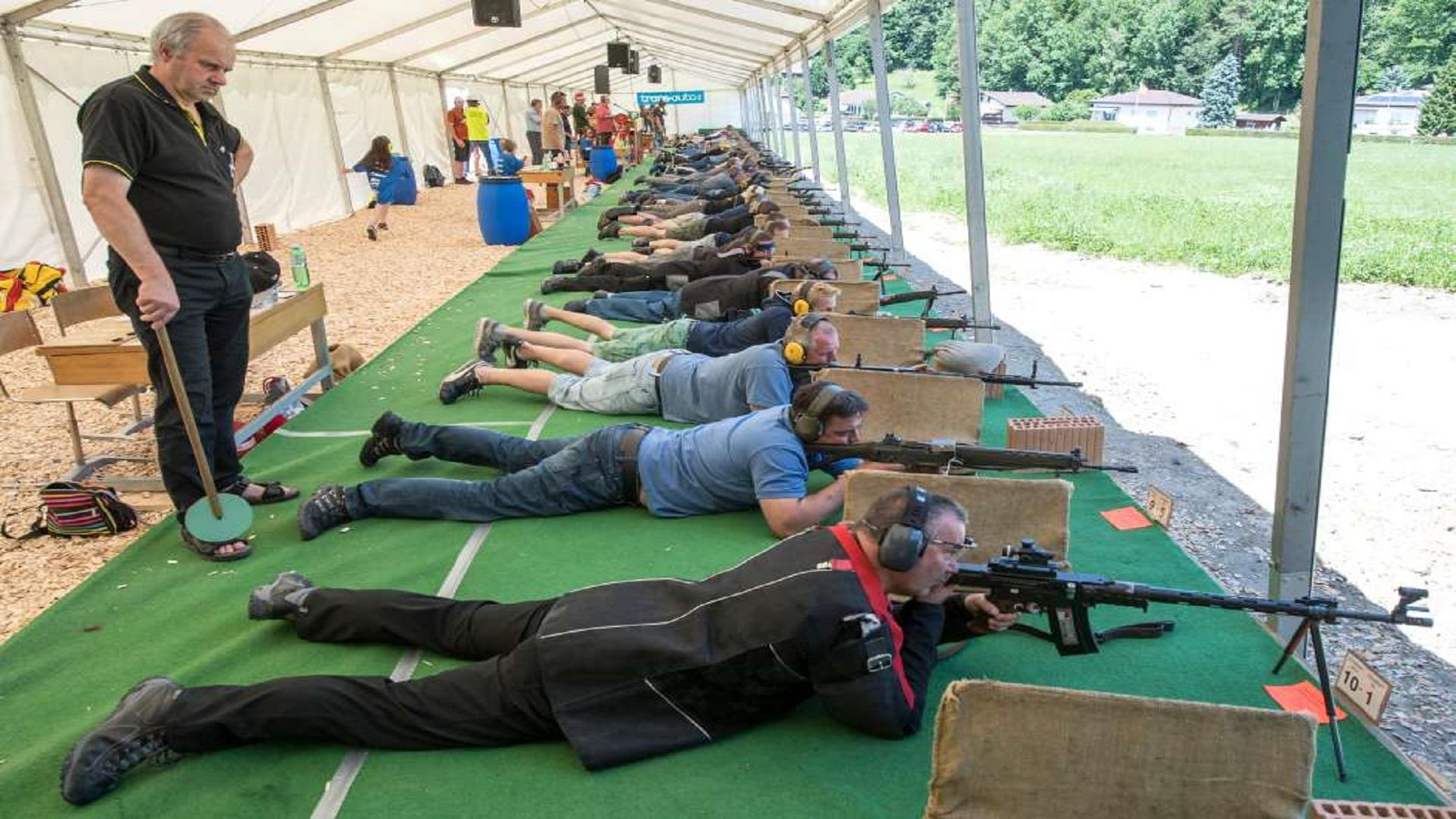
Alterwil Feldschiessen 2022

Additionally, the Schweizerischer Schützenverein, a Swiss shooting association, organizes the Eidgenössische Schützenfeste, every five years and the Eidgenössisches Feldschiessen is held annually. Every person with Swiss citizenship, aged 10 years or older, can take part at any federal ranges and will be able to shoot for free with the ordinance rifle. Before the turn of the century, about 200,000 people used to attend the annual Eidgenössisches Feldschiessen, which is the largest rifle shooting competition in the world. In 2012 they counted 130,000 participants. For the 2015 Federal Shooting (Eidg. Schützenfest) 37,000 shooters are registered. In addition, there are several private shooting ranges which rent guns and groups like ProTell lobby for the preservation of Switzerland's gun rights.

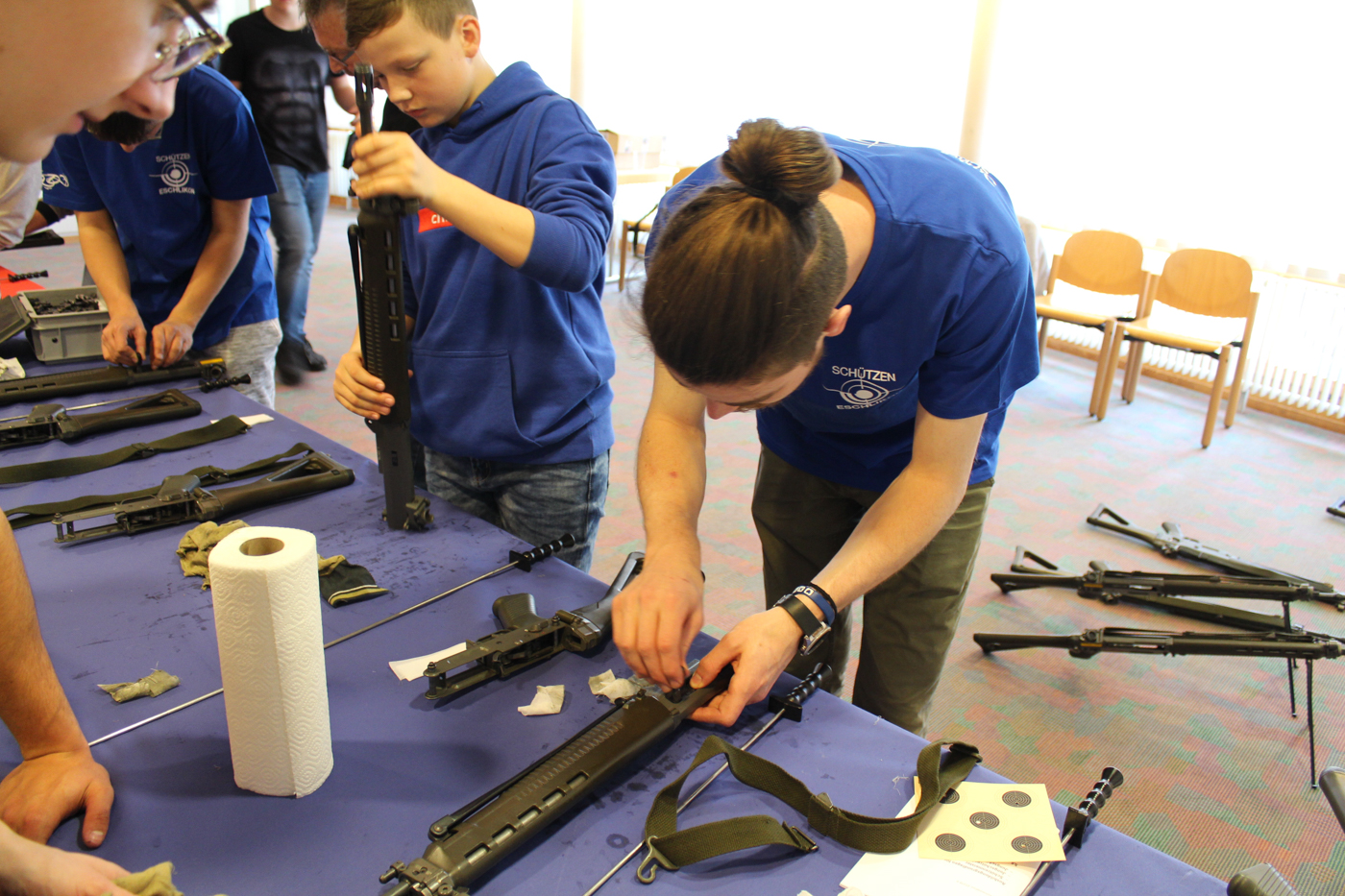
Jungschützen learning to clean their rifle

Another possibility for children to shoot is the Young Shooters: the SAT (lit. shooting and off-duty activities) funds lessons in which Swiss children can learn how to shoot using the SIG SG 550 starting at 15 years old for the regular course, but as young as 10. This activity is free and the Young Shooters are able to take home the rifle in-between the lessons if they are 17. For security reasons, however, the bolt carrier group has to stay at the range in which they attend the lesson. This course takes place over 6 years within a 3-4-month period each year and, if they want, they can then become instructors for the new generation of Young Shooters.

While minors can't acquire firearms, they can be lent firearms by their shooting club or their legal representative. The firearm is then registered to their name for the duration of the lending and they can then transport and use it alone.

The army also sponsors Swiss shooters through free unlimited loans of either the SIG SG 550 and/or P220 provided they participated in four federal exercises (repetition shootings (obligatorische Programm) and Feldschiessen) in the last three years before asking and can show every 3 years that they still participate. It is worth noting that the rifle, while being select-fire, only requires a regular acquisition permit (art. 45 to 47 Schiessverordnung des VBS/Ordonnance du DDPS sur le tir).

In 2016, Swiss Olympic conducted a study on clubs and members in Switzerland: the Swiss Sport Shooting Federation is ranked second in terms of clubs (2,943) and fifth in terms of members (131,325). However the study conducted in 2020 showed the Swiss Sport Shooting Federation was ranked down to ninth position in terms of members despite an increase in licensees (135'997) but still remains at the second position in terms of clubs (2'569) despite a loss of about 400. Those affiliated with the Federation are shooters needing a license in order to compete, those that don't need one will probably not be members as it is not needed.

There are around 30,000 licensed hunters in Switzerland, a number which has remained consistent since the year 2000. The only canton to have forbidden hunting is Geneva, having done so in 1974 after a popular initiative was launched which was accepted by 70% of voters. Since then, Geneva employs between 10 and 15 gamekeepers to control its game population.

== EU Firearms Directive ==
Traditionally liberal Swiss gun legislation has, however, been somewhat tightened in 2008, when Switzerland complied with European Firearms Directive to enter Schengen. Throughout the modern political history of Switzerland, there have been advocates for tighter gun control.

The most recent suggestion for tighter gun control was rejected in a popular referendum in February 2011.

A 2017 amendment to the European Firearms Directive, known as the "EU Gun Ban", introduces new restrictions on firearms possession and acquisition, especially on semi-automatic firearms, personal defense weapons, magazine capacity, blank firing guns and historical firearms. The restrictions must be introduced into the Swiss legal system by August 2018 due to its membership in the Schengen Area.

The Directive also includes an exemption covering a specific Swiss issue – it allows possession to a target shooter of one firearm used during the mandatory military period after leaving the army, provided it was converted to semi-automatic only (art. 6(6) of the Amendment Directive). This part of the Directive specifically was however challenged by the Czech Republic before the European Court of Justice due to its discriminatory nature. The Czech Republic seeks nullification of the "Swiss exemption" as well as of other parts of the Directive.

Civil rights organizations planned to hold a referendum to reject the amended EU directive. According to Swiss People's Party vice-president Christoph Blocher, Switzerland should consider abandoning EU's borderless Schengen Area if the Swiss people reject the proposed measures in a referendum.

In a referendum held on 19 May 2019, voters supported the stricter EU restrictions on semi-automatic weapons, as recommended by the government.

== Firearm-related deaths ==
The vast majority of firearm-related deaths in Switzerland are suicides. The suicide method of shooting oneself with a firearm accounted for 21.5% of suicides in Switzerland in the period of 2001–2012 (with significant gender imbalance: 29.7% of male suicides vs. 3.0% of female suicides). For the period of 2013-2023, firearms accounted for 18.8% of suicides (with significant gender imbalance: 24.6% of male suicides vs. 3.1% of female suicides).

By contrast, gun crime is comparatively limited. In 2016, there were 187 attempted and 45 completed homicides, for a homicide rate of 0.50 per 100,000 population, giving Switzerland one of the lowest homicide rates in the world. Of the recorded homicides (attempted or completed), 20.3% were committed with a gun (47 cases, compared to an average of 41 cases in the period of 2009–2015). In addition, there were 7 cases of bodily harm and 233 cases of robbery committed with firearms.

There were 16 completed homicides with a firearm in 2016. Of these, 14 were committed with a handgun, one with a long gun and one case marked "other/unspecified". None of the involved weapons were ordinance weapons issued by the Swiss Armed Forces. Similarly, out of 31 attempted homicides with firearms, 25 were committed with handguns, two with long guns and four "other/unspecified", with no use of ordinance weapons on record. For the period of 2009–2016, on average 16.5 out of 49.4 completed homicides were committed with a firearm, 13.8 with handguns, 1.9 with long guns and 0.9 "other/unspecified"; an average 0.75 cases per year (6 cases in eight years) involved ordinance weapons. For the following years, the Federal Statistical Office did not go into the details of firearm use so there are no information on the type of gun used.

In 2024, there were 233 attempted and 45 completed homicides, for a homicide rate of 0.50 per 100,000 population. Of the recorded homicides (attempted or completed), 9.3% were committed with a gun (26 cases, compared to an average of 28 cases in the period of 2016–2023), of which 10 were completed which corresponds to a gun homicide rate of 0.11 per 100,000 population. In addition, there were 1 case of bodily harm (0.1% of total bodily harm) and 108 cases of robbery committed with firearms (5.1% of total robberies).

== See also ==
- Number of guns per capita by country
- Gun politics
- Hunting in Switzerland
