= 1986 Zurich shooting =

Mass shooting in Switzerland

- Zürich (Canton of Zurich) Zürich (Switzerland)
- Location: 47.3742°N 8.5401°E; Zurich, Switzerland
- Date: 16 April 1986; 40 years ago
- Attack type: Mass shooting
- Weapon: Taurus Model .38 Special revolver
- Deaths: 4
- Injuries: 1
- Perpetrator: Günther Tschanun
- Motive: Personal conflict with employees
- Convictions: Intentional homicide (later overturned and found guilty of murder)

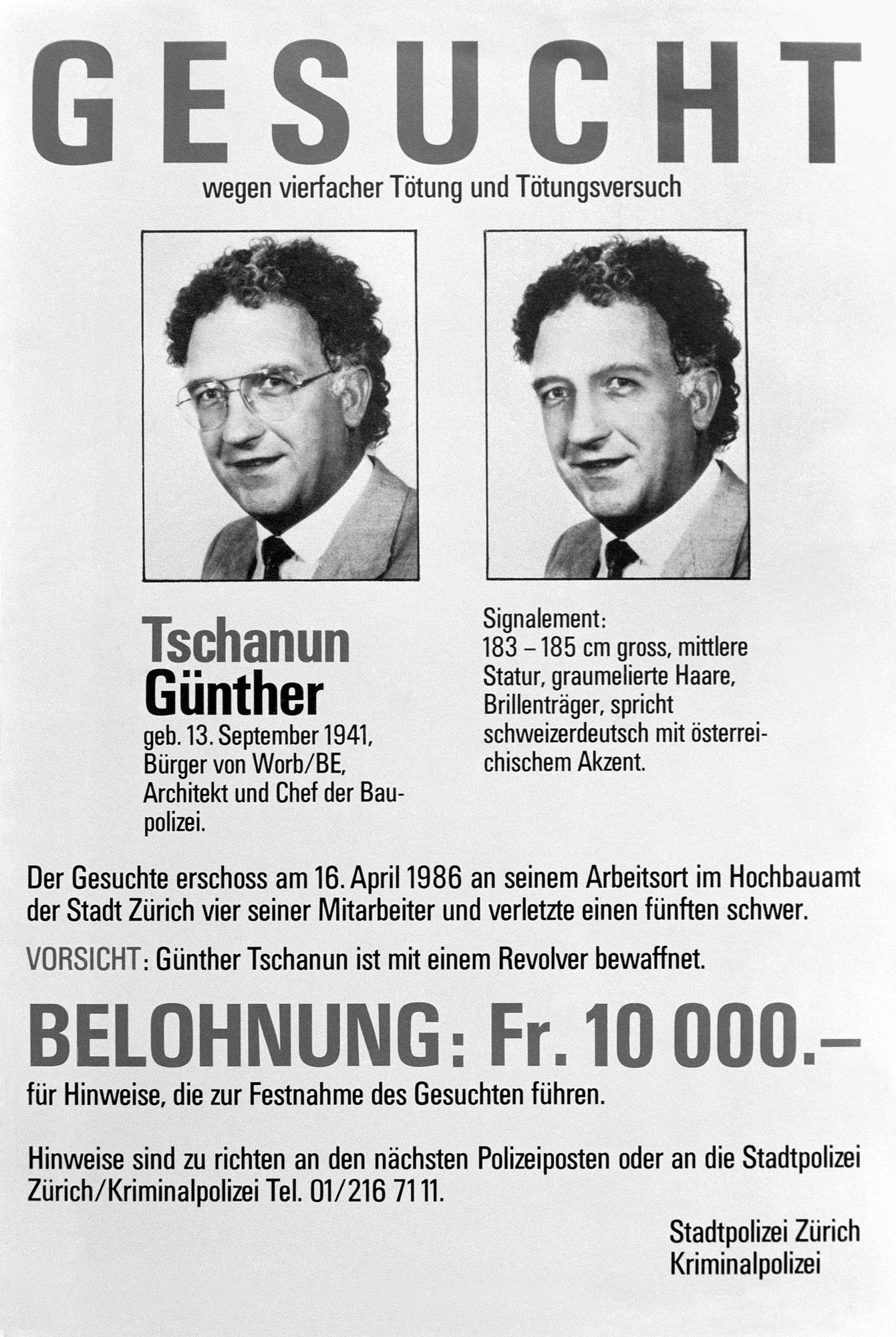
Tschanun's wanted poster.

On 16 April 1986 Günther Tschanun opened fire in his workplace in Zurich, Switzerland, killing four people and seriously injuring one. The shooting came after difficulties and tensions in the building authority, where Tschanun was head. Tschanun escaped and was on the run for several weeks after the shooting, before he was caught in France. It was described by the Tages-Anzeiger as "one of the worst crimes in post-war Swiss history".

Tschanun was initially sentenced to 17 years in prison in 1988 for four counts of intentional homicide. The case was sent to the supreme court, and in 1990 the sentence was overturned. Tschanun was instead sentenced to 20 years and found guilty of murder, and released on parole in 2000. He was issued a new name – Claudio Trentinaglia – which was only revealed to the public after he died in a bicycle accident in 2015.

== Shooting ==
On 16 April 1986, Günther Tschanun opened fire in his workplace, the administrative building Amtshaus IV, with a Taurus Model .38 Special revolver, killing 4 and injuring 1. Tschanun was going to kill himself, but was not able to.

After the shooting, he went on the run, and a 10000 franc reward was issued for his arrest. After three weeks on the run from authorities, he was caught in France.

== Perpetrator ==
Günther Tschanun (13 September 1941 – 25 February 2015) was the chief of the Zürich building authority. He was a member of the Social Democratic Party of Switzerland. The department Tschanun worked at was experiencing difficulties and tensions in the workplace, and several days before the shooting an article that criticized his business management practices was published in the Züri-Woche. Soon after this was published, two officials wrote a letter to their superior criticizing Tschanun and calling for his dismissal.

The day before the shooting, he wrote a will, leaving the furniture to his girlfriend and everything else to his wife. Tschanun had apparently bought the gun in the first place because he was afraid of his girlfriend's husband. He claimed he had no choice and that he had felt "bullied".

== Aftermath ==
Tschanun was initially sentenced to 17 years in prison in 1988 by the Zürcher Obergericht, for four counts of intentional homicide.The federal prosecutor wanted a verdict for murder, and took the case to the supreme court. In January 1990, the sentence was overturned, and Tschanun was instead sentenced to 20 years and found guilty of murder by the Federal Supreme Court of Switzerland in 1990. Some people in the left wing in Switzerland at the time were accused of downplaying Tschanun's actions, viewing him as a "victim of the capitalist system" who had been under too much pressure.

Tschanun was not trusted by corrections. He was released on parole for good behavior in 2000. He was issued a new name – Claudio Trentinaglia – and moved to Ticino. Tschanun died in a bicycle accident on 25 February 2015, falling down the bank of the Maggia. As he was not wearing a helmet, he hit his head and died. His neighbors were unaware of his identity, and Tschanun was buried without this becoming public. This was only revealed six years later, when journalist Michèle Binswanger requested his case file.

The case was discussed in a book by Nicolas Lindt in 2016. The 2010 film 180° – Wenn deine Welt plötzlich Kopf steht by director Cihan Inan was inspired by the case. A 2023 docufiction film retells the story of Tschanun's crimes from the perspective of his neighbor.
