= Romanshorn =

- Municipality
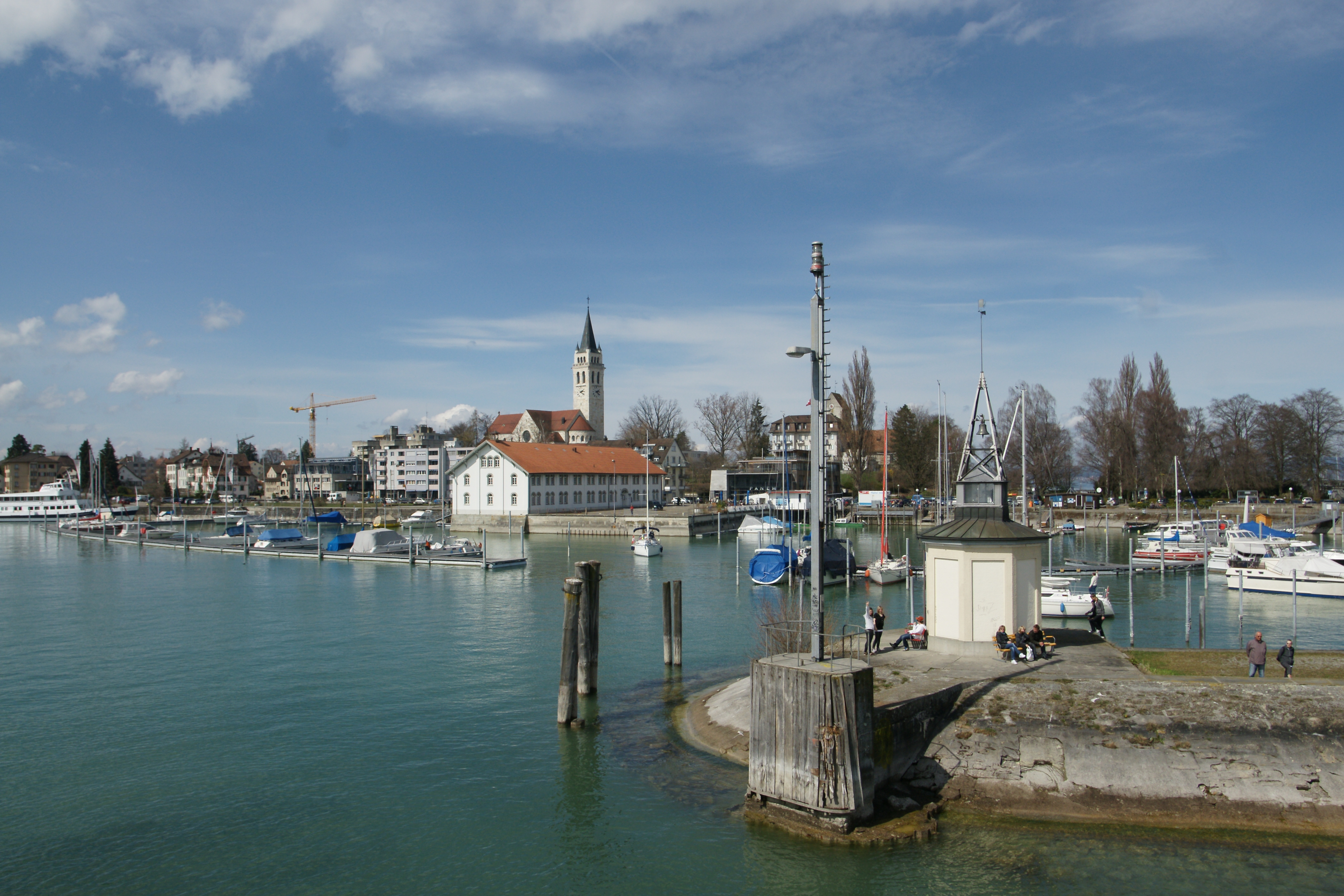

- Coat of arms
- Location of Romanshorn
- Location within Switzerland Location within Canton of Thurgau
- Coordinates: 47°34′N 9°23′E
- Country: Switzerland
- Canton: Thurgau
- District: Arbon

Government
  - Mayor: David H. Bon

Area
  - Total: 8.75 km^{2} (3.38 sq mi)
- Elevation: 406 m (1,332 ft)

Population (December 2007)
  - Total: 9,292
  - Density: 1,060/km^{2} (2,750/sq mi)
- Time zone: UTC+01:00 (CET)
  - Summer (DST): UTC+02:00 (CEST)
- Postal code: 8590
- SFOS number: 4436
- ISO 3166 code: CH-TG
- Surrounded by: Friedrichshafen (DE-BW), Hefenhofen, Immenstaad am Bodensee (DE-BW), Salmsach, Uttwil
- Website: www.romanshorn.ch

Romanshorn is a municipality in the district of Arbon in the canton of Thurgau, Switzerland, located on the southern shore of Lake Constance (Bodensee).

== History ==
Romanshorn was probably settled in the 7th century, and is first mentioned in 779 as Rumanishorn in a land grant from Waldrata to the Abbey of St. Gall. During the Late Middle Ages and until 1367, the bailiwick of Romanshorn was partially owned by the Landsberg family. In 1455 Abbot Kaspar Landsberg sold the Romanshorn estate to the city of St. Gallen, but his religious superiors forced the courts to repeal the sale. Until 1798, the Abbey of St. Gall owned the taxation, appellate court and the homage rights (mostly in Täschlishusen at Häggenschwil) with the remaining sovereignty owned by the County of Thurgau.

In 779 a church was mentioned in Romanshorn. In 1275, the records of the church indicate that the Provost was paid 16 pounds. In 1480 St. Gallen incorporated a church in Romanshorn. The church was expanded in 1504. Then, in 1525 the Protestant Reformation entered Romanshorn and much of the population converted. In 1588, the Reformed priest in Salmsach was appointed to care for Romanshorn as well. The church remained a filial church until the creation of the Romanshorn-Salmsach parish. It wasn't until 1567 that the abbot appointed a Roman Catholic priest to Romanshorn. The next year, a rectory was built and a sinecure was granted. The number of Catholics slowly grew (1588 there were 2 families and in 1711 there were 36 families). The church was renovated in 1829. It remained a shared church until 1911 when a Protestant church was completed. Two years later a Catholic church was also completed.

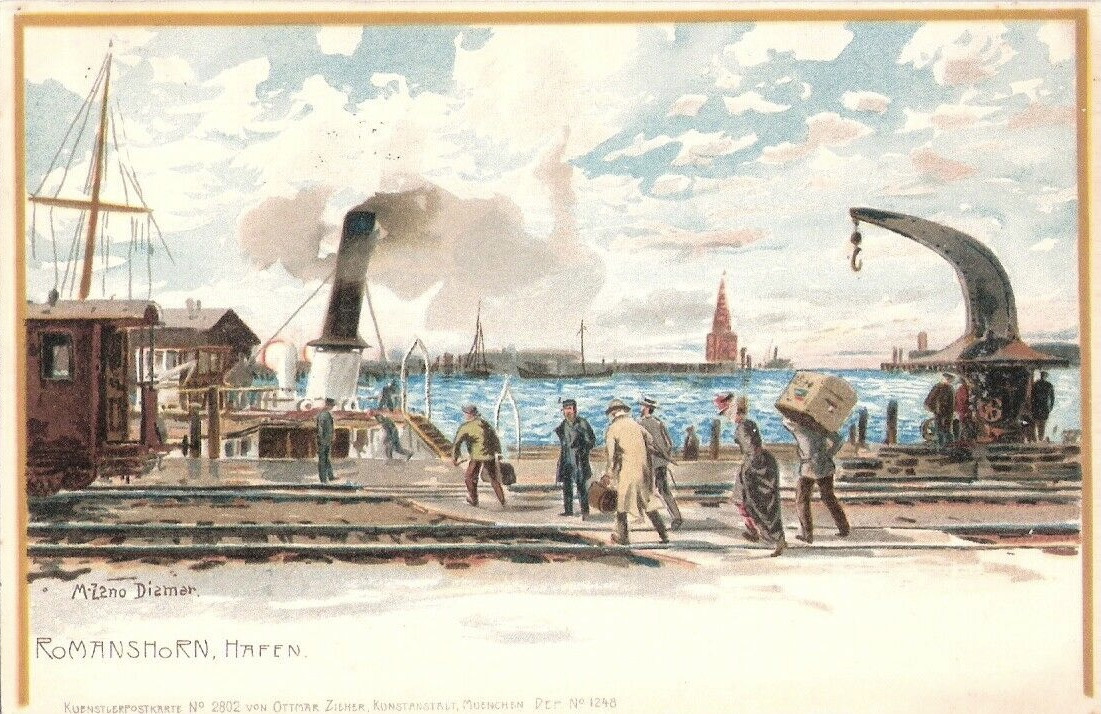
The harbour c. 1905 by Michael Zeno Diemer

The local economy was dominated by cereal grains, horticulture and fruit growing as well as some forestry and fishing. By 1902, some wine was being produced as well. The steamboats, which had operated out of Uttwil since 1824, moved to Romanshorn in 1832. However, the village didn't begin to grow until 1844 when the Canton of Thurgau built a port and the postal route to Swabia ran through Romanshorn. In 1855 the railway line Zurich-Romanshorn opened, and in 1856 a telegraph cable was laid across the lake. The rail line (rail ferry) from Lindau to Romanshorn opened in 1869, was expanded in 1945 and in 1976 was replaced by car ferries. Between 1869 and 1871, the Northeastern Railway line Rorschach-Romanshorn-Constance opened. Then, in 1910 a railway line to St. Gallen was added.

Aerial view from 300 m by Walter Mittelholzer (1924)

Romanshorn's strategic position after 1850 attracted commercial and industrial businesses. The Fatzer company, founded in 1836, initially produced cords and ropes. In 1895 it moved to the cable production. By 1985, the company produced 2,000 tonnes of steel wire and had 85 employees. From the pharmacy of Max Zeller, which opened in 1864 and sold the famous Zeller balm, the company Max Zeller & Sons developed. In 2008, this pharmaceutical company employed just under 100 employees. Opened in 1892, by 1980 the Swiss Alcohol Board possessed a capacity of 30 million liters of alcohol. In 1904, the Voigt Pharmaceutical company was founded in Romanshorn, which grew to be a world-wide pharmaceutical shipping company, and employ about 250 people in 2008. Other well-known companies include Biro (Plastics), the engineering Hydrel (including hydraulic, pneumatic) and the Asco Kohlensäure AG.

On 30 August 1912 an ex-soldier and local resident named Hermann Schwarz went on a shooting spree that left seven people dead and several others wounded. After the shooting he was examined by several psychiatrists and was found to suffer from mental illness, resulting in his acquittal due to insanity. He was ordered to be institutionalized for the rest of his life.

== Geography ==
Romanshorn has an area, as of 2009, of 8.75 square kilometers (3.38 sq mi). Of this area, 3.61 km^{2} (1.39 sq mi) or 41.3% is used for agricultural purposes, while 2.11 km^{2} (0.81 sq mi) or 24.1% is forested. Of the rest of the land, 2.92 km^{2} (1.13 sq mi) or 33.4% is settled (buildings or roads), 0.04 km^{2} (9.9 acres) or 0.5% is either rivers or lakes and 0.02 km^{2} (4.9 acres) or 0.2% is unproductive land.

Of the built up area, industrial buildings made up 17.1% of the total area while housing and buildings made up 4.7% and transportation infrastructure made up 1.0%. Power and water infrastructure as well as other special developed areas made up 3.2% of the area while parks, green belts and sports fields made up 7.3%. Out of the forested land, 21.8% of the total land area is heavily forested and 2.3% is covered with orchards or small clusters of trees. Of the agricultural land, 32.6% is used for growing crops, while 8.7% is used for orchards or vine crops.

The municipality is located in the Arbon district, on Lake Constance. It consists of the village of Romanshorn and the hamlets of Holzenstein, Hotterdingen, Reckholdern, Riedern and Spitz. Most of the surrounding hamlets have grown together with Romanshorn.

== Demographics ==
Romanshorn has a population (as of December 2020) of 11,327. As of 2008, 27.3% of the population are foreign nationals. Over the last 10 years (1997–2007) the population has changed at a rate of 0.8%. Most of the population (as of 2000) speaks German (83.7%), with Albanian being second most common (3.3%) and Italian being third (2.9%).

As of 2008, the gender distribution of the population was 48.6% male and 51.4% female. The population was made up of 3,231 Swiss men (34.0% of the population), and 1,383 (14.6%) non-Swiss men. There were 3,669 Swiss women (38.7%), and 1,207 (12.7%) non-Swiss women.

In 2008 there were 48 live births to Swiss citizens and 27 births to non-Swiss citizens, and in same time span there were 89 deaths of Swiss citizens and 6 non-Swiss citizen deaths. Ignoring immigration and emigration, the population of Swiss citizens decreased by 41 while the foreign population increased by 21. There were 14 Swiss men who emigrated from Switzerland to another country, 6 Swiss women who emigrated from Switzerland to another country, 65 non-Swiss men who emigrated from Switzerland to another country and 60 non-Swiss women who emigrated from Switzerland to another country. The total Swiss population change in 2008 (from all sources) was an increase of 56 and the non-Swiss population change was an increase of 114 people. This represents a population growth rate of 1.8%.

The age distribution, as of 2009, in Romanshorn is; 837 children or 8.7% of the population are between 0 and 9 years old and 1,158 teenagers or 12.1% are between 10 and 19. Of the adult population, 1,272 people or 13.2% of the population are between 20 and 29 years old. 1,109 people or 11.5% are between 30 and 39, 1,486 people or 15.5% are between 40 and 49, and 1,339 people or 13.9% are between 50 and 59. The senior population distribution is 1,035 people or 10.8% of the population are between 60 and 69 years old, 768 people or 8.0% are between 70 and 79, there are 499 people or 5.2% who are between 80 and 89, and there are 103 people or 1.1% who are 90 and older.

As of 2000, there were 3,858 private households in the municipality, and an average of 2.3 persons per household. In 2000 there were 942 single family homes (or 64.8% of the total) out of a total of 1,454 inhabited buildings. There were 160 two family buildings (11.0%), 137 three family buildings (9.4%) and 215 multi-family buildings (or 14.8%). There were 2,232 (or 24.6%) persons who were part of a couple without children, and 4,585 (or 50.5%) who were part of a couple with children. There were 473 (or 5.2%) people who lived in single parent home, while there are 44 persons who were adult children living with one or both parents, 46 persons who lived in a household made up of relatives, 55 who lived in a household made up of unrelated persons, and 277 who are either institutionalized or live in another type of collective housing.

The vacancy rate for the municipality, in 2008, was 2.63%. As of 2007, the construction rate of new housing units was 12.3 new units per 1000 residents. In 2000 there were 4,442 apartments in the municipality. The most common apartment size was the 4 room apartment of which there were 1,448. There were 171 single room apartments and 495 apartments with six or more rooms.

In the 2007 federal election the most popular party was the SVP which received 35.31% of the vote. The next three most popular parties were the SP (16.03%), the CVP (14.78%) and the FDP (13.58%). In the federal election, a total of 2,450 votes were cast, and the voter turnout was 42.9%.

The historical population is given in the following table:

year	population
1831	1,218
1850	1,408
1900	4,577
1950	6,648
1980	7,893
2000	9,076

== Heritage sites of national significance ==
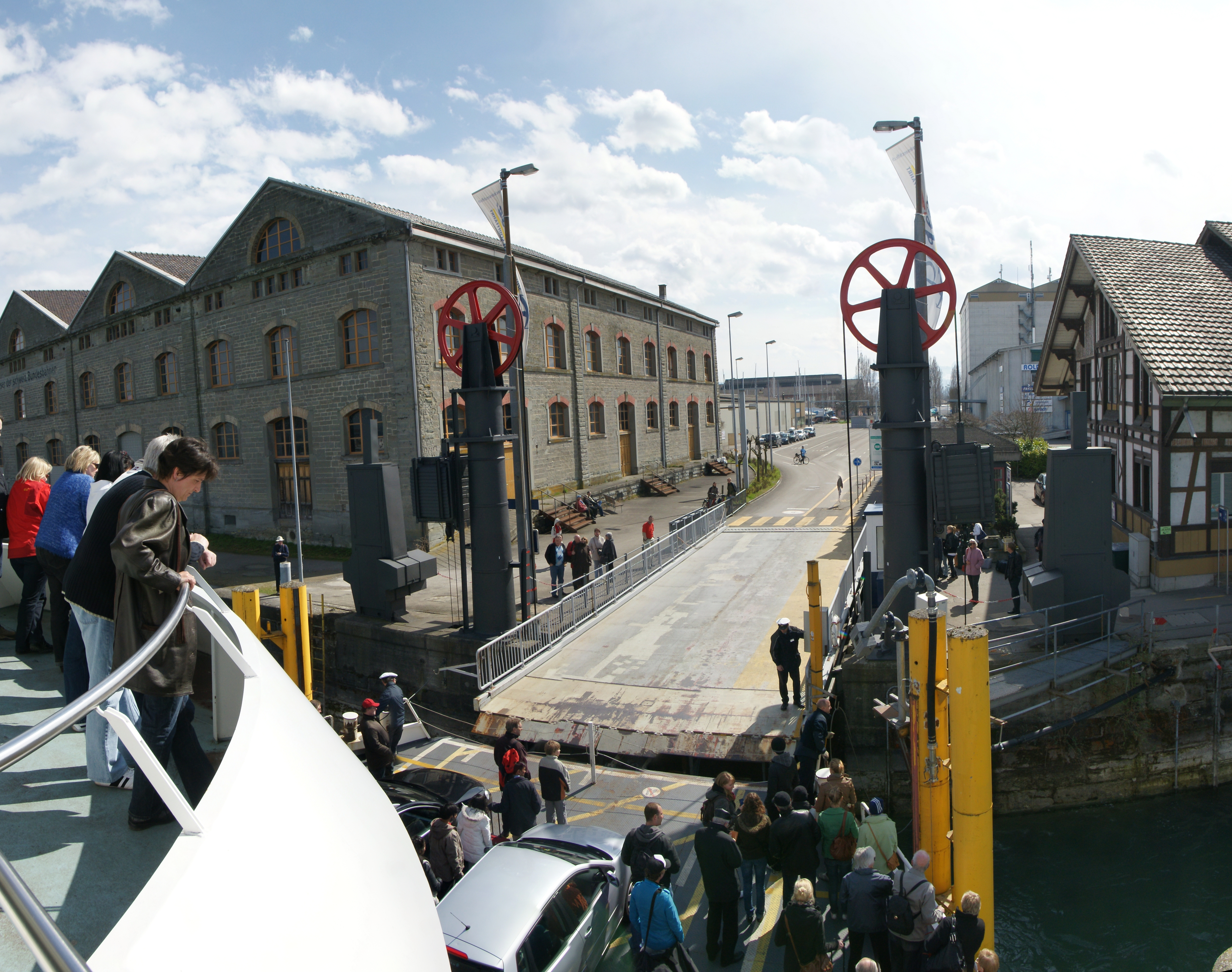
Ferry landing at the Romanshorn Harbor

The Old Paritätische Church, Harbor, Catholic Church of St Johannes der Täufer are listed as Swiss heritage site of national significance. The entire village of Romanshorn is listed in the Inventory of Swiss Heritage Sites.

== Economy ==
As of 2007, Romanshorn had an unemployment rate of 3.13%. As of 2005, there were 81 people employed in the primary economic sector and about 29 businesses involved in this sector. 2,137 people are employed in the secondary sector and there are 90 businesses in this sector. 3,085 people are employed in the tertiary sector, with 345 businesses in this sector.

In 2000 there were 5,805 workers who lived in the municipality. Of these, 2,038 or about 35.1% of the residents worked outside Romanshorn while 2,820 people commuted into the municipality for work. There were a total of 6,587 jobs (of at least 6 hours per week) in the municipality. Of the working population, 12% used public transportation to get to work, and 40.4% used a private car.

=== Companies in Romanshorn ===
- Eugster/Frismag AG

== Transportation ==
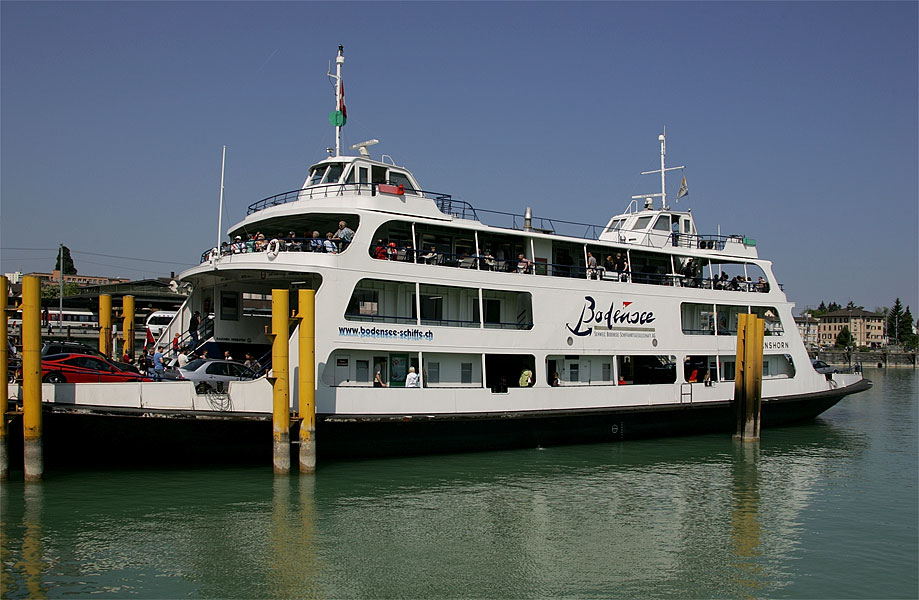
Harbor

Romanshorn railway station, opened in 1855, forms the junction between the Winterthur–Romanshorn railway, the Schaffhausen–Rorschach railway and the Romanshorn–Nesslau Neu St. Johann railway.

A car ferry connects Romanshorn with Friedrichshafen across the lake in Baden-Württemberg, Germany. Between 1869 and 1976, there used to be train ferries.

== Religion ==
From the 2000 census, 3,220 or 35.5% are Roman Catholic, while 3,297 or 36.3% belong to the Swiss Reformed Church. Of the rest of the population, there are 6 Old Catholics (or about 0.07% of the population) who belong to the Christian Catholic Church of Switzerland, there are 171 individuals (or about 1.88% of the population) who belong to the Orthodox Church, and there are 292 individuals (or about 3.22% of the population) who belong to another Christian church. There are 1,002 (or about 11.04% of the population) who are Islamic. There are 87 individuals (or about 0.96% of the population) who belong to another church (not listed on the census), 679 (or about 7.48% of the population) belong to no church, are agnostic or atheist, and 322 individuals (or about 3.55% of the population) did not answer the question.

== Education ==
In Romanshorn about 61.9% of the population (between age 25-64) have completed either non-mandatory upper secondary education or additional higher education (either university or a Fachhochschule).

Romanshorn is home to the Romanshorn primary school district. It is also home to the Romanshorn-Salmsach secondary school district. In the 2008/2009 school year there are 731 students in the primary school district. There are 185 children in the kindergarten, and the average class size is 18.5 kindergartners. Of the children in kindergarten, 80 or 43.2% are female, 84 or 45.4% are not Swiss citizens and 86 or 46.5% do not speak German natively. The lower and upper primary levels begin at about age 5-6 and lasts for 6 years. There are 272 children in who are at the lower primary level and 274 children in the upper primary level. The average class size in the primary school is 19.52 students. At the lower primary level, there are 118 children or 43.4% of the total population who are female, 116 or 42.6% are not Swiss citizens and 117 or 43.0% do not speak German natively. In the upper primary level, there are 146 or 53.3% who are female, 98 or 35.8% are not Swiss citizens and 102 or 37.2% do not speak German natively.

In the secondary school district there are 366 students. At the secondary level, students are divided according to performance. The secondary level begins at about age 12 and usually lasts 3 years. There are 181 teenagers who are in the advanced school, of which 108 or 59.7% are female, 29 or 16.0% are not Swiss citizens and 33 or 18.2% do not speak German natively. There are 163 teenagers who are in the standard school, of which 74 or 45.4% are female, 70 or 42.9% are not Swiss citizens and 76 or 46.6% do not speak German natively. Finally, there are 22 teenagers who are in special or remedial classes, of which 11 or 50.0% are female, 12 or 54.5% are not Swiss citizens and 16 or 72.7% do not speak German natively. The average class size for all classes at the secondary level is 19.11 students.

== Festivals ==
Since 1999 the annual Festival of Nations has taken place every June.

== Moc Moc ==
In 2004 there was erected a statue of Moc moc by Swiss artist group Com&Com (de).

== Notable people ==
- Johann Georg Birnstiel (1858 – 1927), Swiss minister and writer, died in Romanshorn
- Émile Taddéoli (1879 – 1920 in Romanshorn), a Swiss aviation pioneer, instructor and test pilot
- Maria Stader (1911-1999), a Hungarian-born Swiss lyric soprano, known particularly for her Mozart interpretations; brought up in Romanshorn
- Christoph Sutter (born 1962), teacher, poet, presenter, musical and theater author

Sport

- Peter Lüscher (born 1956 in Romanshorn), a former World Cup alpine ski racer
- Daniel Lopar (born 1985), a Swiss football goalkeeper
