= Schaffhausen massacre =

1401 antisemitic mass killing and forced conversion event

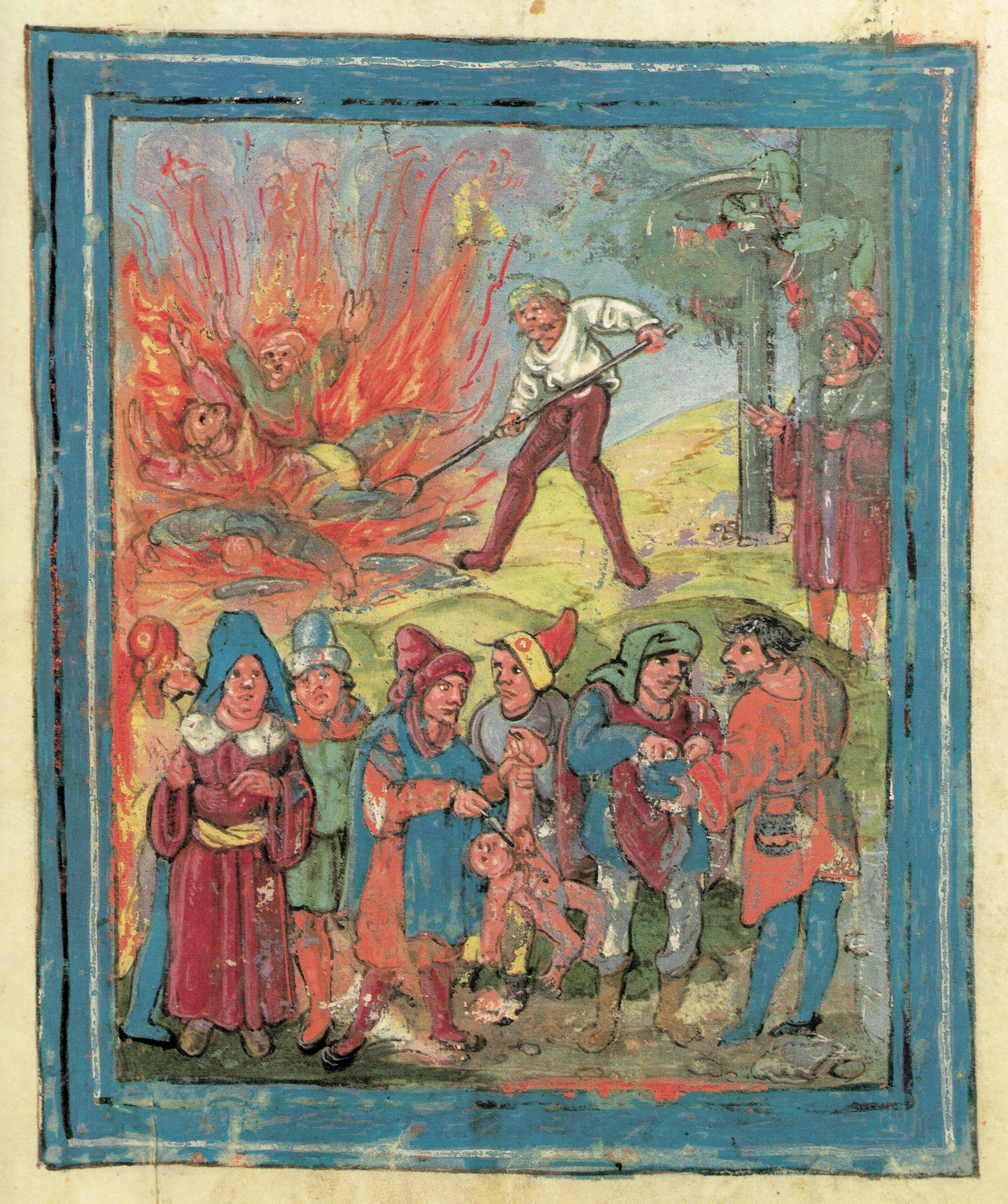
- Burning of the Jews because of the alleged ritual murder of Konrad Lori from Diessenhofen, as depicted in Diebold Schilling the Younger's Luzerner Schilling
- Date: June 25, 1401
- Location: Schaffhausen (present-day Switzerland); 47°42′N 8°38′E
- Cause: Anti-Semitism (Alleged ritual murder)
- Deaths: 30 Jews

The Schaffhausen massacre was an anti-Semitic episode in Schaffhausen, in present-day Switzerland, which occurred in 1401. An episode of antisemitism had already occurred in Schaffhausen 52 years prior, when the local Jews were accused of well poisoning and burned alive on 22 February 1349. On this occasion, the Jews were accused of the murder of a four-year-old boy, Konrad Lori from Diessenhofen. Forced confession were obtained from them, and on 25 June 1401 they were executed by burning.

Today, there is a plaque in Schaffhausen, commemorating the suffering of the Schaffhausen Jews in the Middle Ages.

== Background ==
Another major antisemitic incident had already occurred in Schaffhausen. On 22 February 1349, as part of the Black Death persecutions, where the Jews were accused of spreading the bubonic plague by poisoning wells, the Jews of Schaffhausen were rounded up and burned to death. Their houses were taken over by the city or the Austrian dukes, while all debts owed to the Jews were declared settled. Twenty years passed, and the Jews managed to settle in the city again.

== The massacre ==
Some 30 years after their return, the Jews were accused again, this time of ritual murder. At the time of Easter of 1401, a boy, four-year-old Konrad Lori, son of the Diessenhofen city council member Hermann Lori, was brutally murdered in Diessenhofen. The probable perpetrator, a Christian man, was apprehended as he was trying to flee. The man, who could then only expect a death sentence under those circumstances, started to make baseless claims, claiming that he was instigated by the Jews to commit the murder. According to the reports, the man claimed to have received three guilders to commit the crime by a Jewish man, who "wanted the boy's blood". The rumor quickly spread to the Schaffhausen region, where it became a topic of conversation. Next, a Schaffhausen Jew by the name of Hirt (or Hirtz), who had been accused in Diessenhofen, was arrested and brutally tortured. Many Jews, understanding what was happening, tried to escape. Three tried to make it to Stein am Rhein via Feuerthalen, but were caught. The fact the Jews were caught while trying to escape increased suspicion.

The Jew named Hirt then confessed to the tormentors what they wanted to hear. He admitted to a "conspiracy by Jews in the Lake Constance area and in eastern Switzerland. Two Jews from Constance were said to have been willing to pay him 80 guilders for Christian blood" (about 32,000 dollars in 2018). More Jews were then tortured and more "confessions" obtained, with the Jews "confessing" that they "wanted to drink the Christian blood or use it to make tinctures that were supposed to poison the cattle and the wells in Schaffhausen". Yet more Jews were caught and imprisoned, and they would be tortured for weeks, including women and children. Sources from the time describe the cruelty of the tortures the Jews suffered.

In 1401, 30 Jews were sentenced to death after cruel torture, and burned on 25 June 1401. Three men were said to have been so disabled by torture, that they could not walk to the pyre. Several sources report that, when they arrived to the pyre, the spirits of the badly wounded were enlivened. Several council servants from Schaffhausen reported that the condemned protested their innocence loudly, asking to be spared and to "pray for them". The ledger of Schaffhausen noted "226 pounds of Jewish gold" as income and "an invoice for the straw that is needed for the pyre".

The remains of the Jews were put in a pit and buried. At the same time, the murdered child Konrad was revered in Diessenhofen, with even miracles said to have taken place at his grave.

== Aftermath ==
The Jews were allowed back to Schaffhausen about 20 years after the event, but they were forced to wear red caps so as to be recognized as Jews, following a decision by the Council of Basel. However, the city of Schaffhausen also decreed that the property of deceased Jews would not go to the citizens or city council but be passed to the heirs of the deceased (to prevent persecution of Jews out of greed).

== Legacy ==
A commemorative plaque was placed on the city's synagogue. The plaque was replaced in September 2018, following an initiative by private individuals, when a new plaque, remembering the persecution of the Jews in Schaffhausen in the Middle Ages, was unveiled at the inner courtyard of Neustadt 39.

== See also ==
- History of the Jews in Switzerland
- List of massacres in Switzerland
- Martyrdom in Judaism
