= Erfurt Treasure =

Hoard found in Germany

- Material: Gold, silver, bronze, iron, and organic material
- Created: 14th century
- Period/culture: Middle Ages
- Discovered: Erfurt excavations in the city centre, 1998
- Present location: Old Synagogue (Erfurt)

The Erfurt Treasure is a hoard of coins, goldsmiths' work and jewellery that is assumed to have belonged to a Jew of Erfurt, Germany who hid them in 1349 before perishing in the Erfurt massacre, one of the persecutions and massacres of Jews during the Black Death. The treasure was found in 1998 in the wall of a house in a medieval Jewish neighbourhood in Erfurt.

== History ==
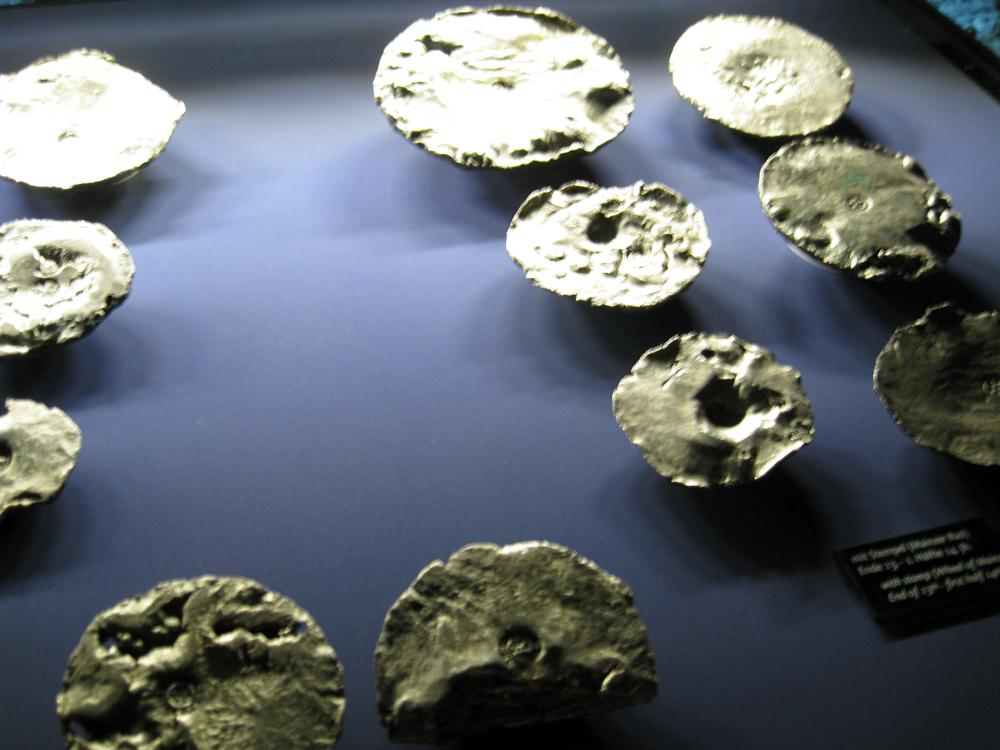
Some of the ingots

The treasure was discovered in 1998 by archaeologists in the Michaelisstrasse under the wall of a cellar entry. It consists of silver coins and ingots as well as over 700 extraordinary works of goldsmith work dating to the 13th and 14th centuries. The majority of the treasure is made up of 24 kilograms (53 lb) of silver coins and ingots. The 3141 coins are all Tornesel, from the late 13th and early 14th century, thus making up the largest single find of this type of coin. In addition, there are 14 ingots of various sizes, with all of them except one stamp marked.

There are also 11 pieces of silver tableware including a Doppelkopf (a common form of cup in the 14th and 15th century), a shallow drinking bowl, a jug and 8 goblets that fit into each other. The latter are adorned with gothic arcades that have been gilded, these date to the first half of the 14th century.

The jewellery includes 8 brooches of various sizes set with ornamental stones, the largest brooch measuring 7 centimetres (2.8 in) across. Among the 8 finger rings, one is a Jewish wedding ring. This outstanding piece is made of gold with a bezel composed of openwork Gothic tracery, capped by a facetted steeple. Made in the early 14th century, it is one of few existing medieval Ashkenazi wedding rings. The ring features a beautifully crafted, ornate, miniature version of a gothic tower and six engraved Hebrew letters that spell out mazal tov, meaning "good fate" or "good luck", on the tower's roof. In accordance with Jewish tradition, the magnificent wedding ring is made entirely of gold without the addition of stones. Only two other Jewish wedding rings from the first half of the 14th century have so far been found in Central Europe (Colmar and Weißenfels). The jewellery, in particular, has drawn the attention of scholars, since little 14th-century jewelry survives, as jewelry was often melted down when it was deemed out of style and its value as bullion outweighed other considerations.

Besides the coins, the majority of individual pieces are accounted for by garment appliques and belt adornments (totaling 600 pieces). Dozens of garment appliques are an extremely unusual find. These are small, silver sequins in various shapes, intended to be sewn onto garments. They were at the height of fashion in the 14th century, but, because they were made of solid silver, when the fashion changed all were melted down. The few surviving examples are almost all part of ecclesiastical textiles owned by churches. Erfurt provides rare evidence of the use of such ornaments in secular clothing.

Similar treasures were hidden in times of acute distress for the Jewish communities at Colmar, Weißenfels, Lingenfeld, Münster and Środa Śląska. The Erfurt Treasure, however, is far larger than any of the others.

The owner of the Erfurt Treasure before the Erfurt massacre in March 1349 is believed to have been a Jewish moneychanger named Kalman von Wiehe.

== Exhibitions of the Treasure ==
An exhibition, "Trésors de la Peste Noire", at the Musée National du Moyen Âge in the Hôtel de Cluny, Paris, between April and September 2007 brought objects from the Erfurt Treasure together with the Colmar Treasure.

An exhibition, "Erfurt: Jewish Treasures from Medieval Ashkenaz," was on display at the Yeshiva University Museum of the Center for Jewish History in New York City between September 2008 and January 2009.

The Erfurt Treasure was displayed in London at the Wallace Collection and at Beth Hatefutsoth in Tel Aviv, before going on permanent display at the newly restored 11th-century Old Synagogue museum in Erfurt.

== See also ==
- Colmar Treasure
