= Old Synagogue (Erfurt) =

11th-century former synagogue in Germany

Old Synagogue, Erfurt
- German: Alte Synagoge; Yiddish: אלטע שול, ערפורט; Hebrew: בית הכנסת הישן (ארפורט)
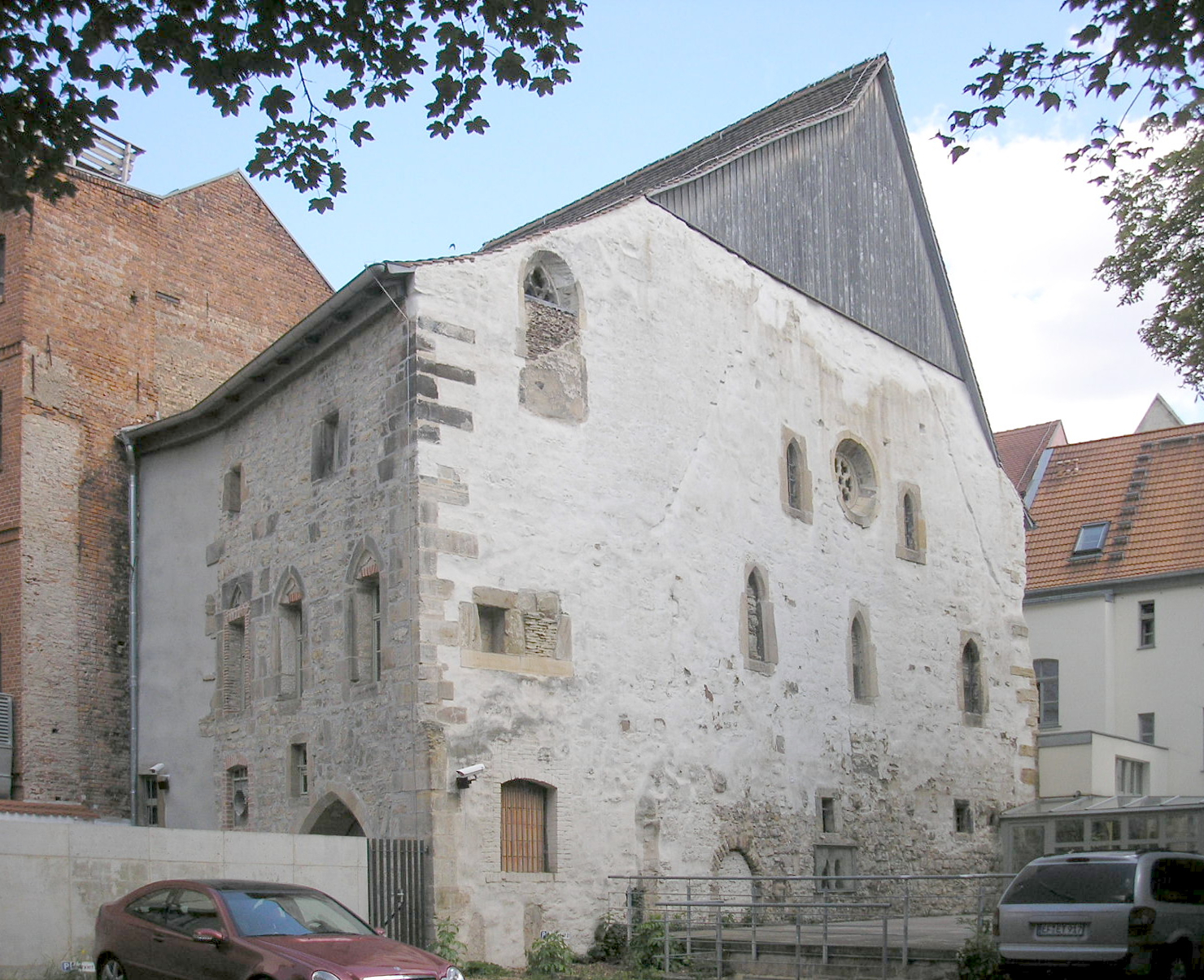
- The former synagogue, now museum, in 2009

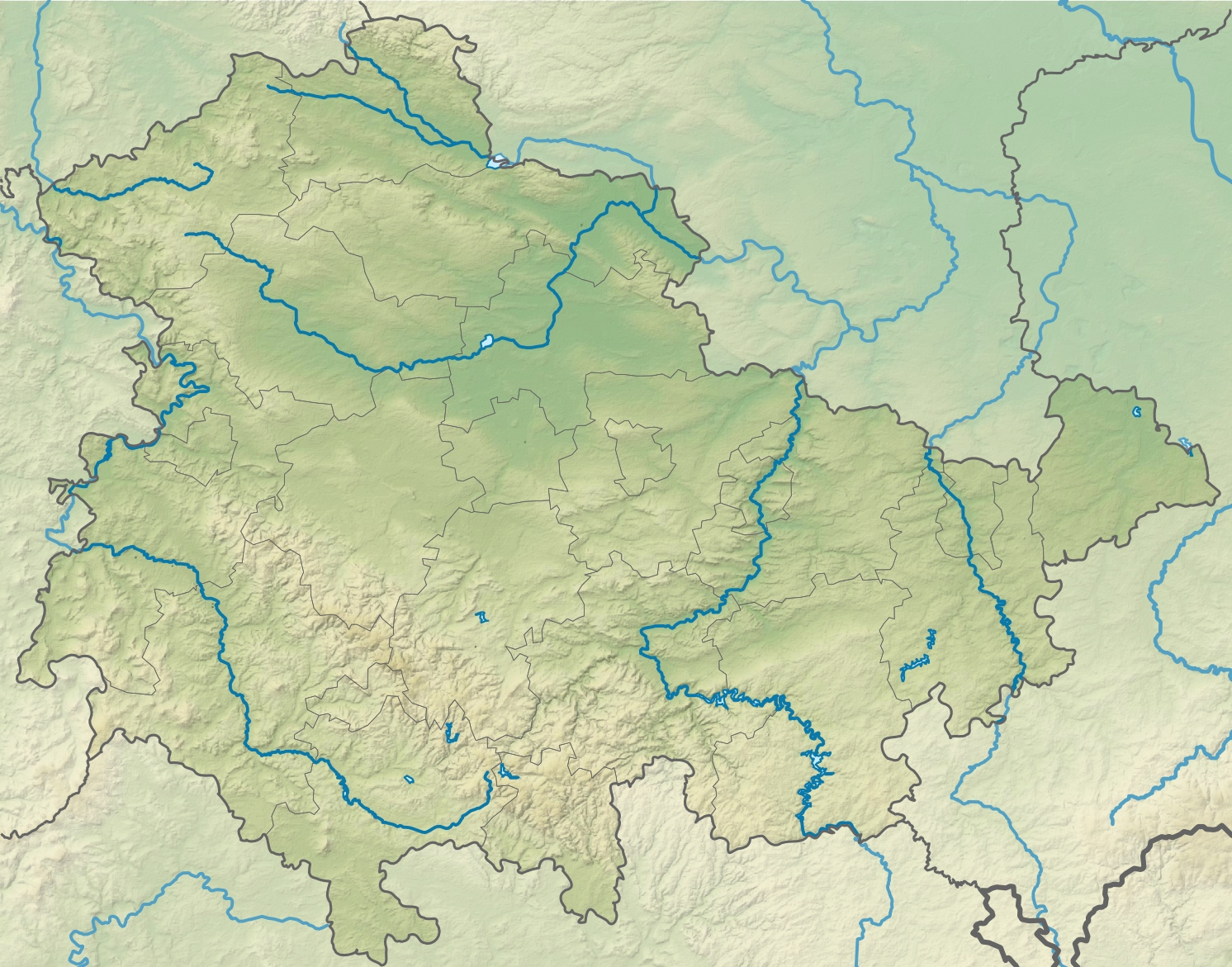
- Location of the former synagogue, now museum, in Thuringia

Religion
- Affiliation: Judaism (former)
- Rite: Nusach Ashkenaz
- Ecclesiastical or organizational status: Synagogue (11th–14th century); Jewish museum (since 2009)
- Status: Abandoned (as a synagogue); Repurposed (as a museum)

Location
- Location: Erfurt, Thuringia
- Country: Germany
- Interactive map of Old Synagogue, Erfurt
- Coordinates: 50°58′43″N 11°1′45.5″E

Architecture
- Type: Synagogue architecture
- Style: Romanesque; Gothic
- Groundbreaking: c. 1094
- Completed: early 14th century

Website
- juedisches-leben.erfurt.de/jl/en/middle-ages/old_synagogue/index.html

UNESCO World Heritage Site
- Official name: Jewish-Medieval Heritage of Erfurt
- Type: Cultural
- Criteria: iv
- Designated: 2023 (45th session)
- Reference no.: 1656

The Old Synagogue (German: Alte Synagoge; Yiddish: אלטע שול, ערפורט; Hebrew: בית הכנסת הישן (ארפורט)) is a former Jewish synagogue, located in Erfurt, Thuringia, Germany.

Dating from the late 11th century, the synagogue is one of the best preserved Medieval synagogues in Europe. Most parts of the building date from around 1250–1320. Following the massacre and expulsion of the local Jewish community in the wake of the Black Death in 1349, the building served various purposes in the centuries that followed such as a storehouse, restaurant, and ballroom. By the Nazi era, its history as a synagogue had long been forgotten, allowing the building to remain untouched – it was only in the late 1980s that its history met renewed interest. Due to the fact that its roof is intact, it is thought to be the oldest intact synagogue building in the world.

Since 2009, it has been used as a museum of local Jewish history. It houses the Erfurt Treasure, a hoard of medieval coins, goldsmiths' work and jewellery found in 1998. It also has facsimiles of the Erfurt Hebrew Manuscripts, an important collection of 12th–14th century religious texts that belonged to the medieval Jewish community of Erfurt.

The Historic Synagogues of Europe project, carried out by the Center for Jewish Art at the Hebrew University of Jerusalem, has given the Old Synagogue, Erfurt its highest level of significance rating: 4 (International) – "The building is of outstanding architectural, urban or historical importance. It has unique features and/or is especially influential internationally as an architectural pattern."

In 2023, the Old Synagogue, Mikveh, and the 'Stone House', a secular building from c. 1250 in Erfurt's medieval city centre which had Jewish owners, were inscribed on the UNESCO World Heritage List in 2023 because of their exceptional preservation and testimony to the life of medieval Jewish communities.

== History and preservation ==
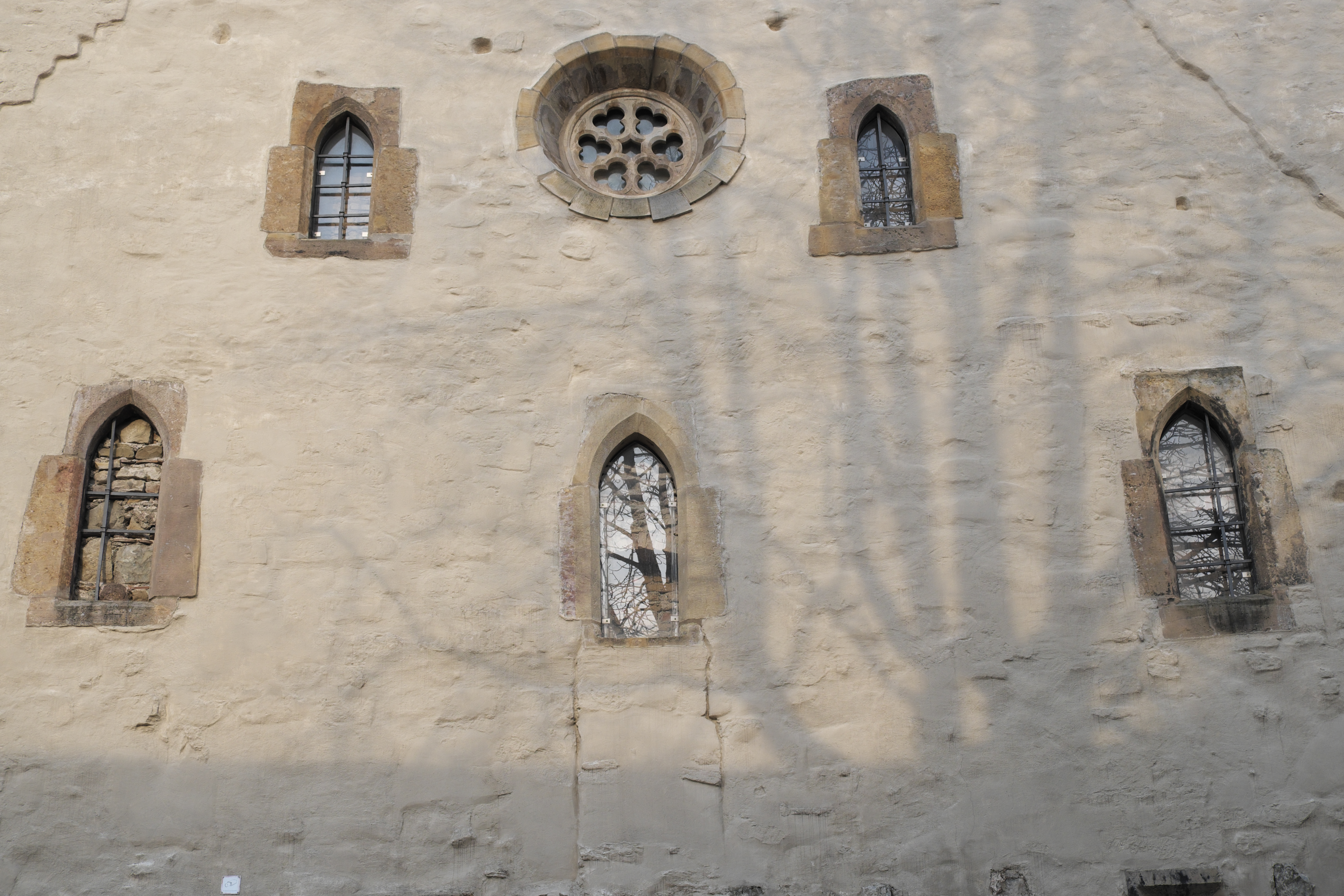
Windows on the western façade, c. 1270

The oldest parts of the building have been dated by dendrochronology to 1094. There was a second construction phase in the 12th century, from which part of the western wall, with a sandstone double-arched window, has been preserved.

Around 1270, a larger synagogue incorporating parts of the earlier building was constructed. The western façade, with five lancet windows and a large rosette window, dates from this time. In the early 1300s, it was extended and another storey was added.

After the Erfurt Massacre of 1349, in which the Jewish population was murdered and expelled from the city, the synagogue was damaged. The city of Erfurt took ownership of the building and later sold it to a local merchant. It was converted into a warehouse and a vaulted cellar was built underneath. The alterations considerably changed the interior of the building. For the next 500 years it was used for storing goods.

From the 19th century, the building had various uses and had at different periods a ballroom, a restaurant and even two bowling alleys. These changes, and changes to the surrounding buildings, meant that the Old Synagogue, which is on a back lot down a narrow alleyway, was largely forgotten. Its history wasn't recognised, which helped to protect it during the Nazi period.

It was not until the late 1980s that interest was awakened in the old building. The architectural historian Elmar Altwasser began to research it in 1992. Erfurt City Council bought the property in 1998 and extensively researched and conserved it.

During the conservation, great emphasis was put on the preservation of all traces of use: those dating from synagogal use as well as those from later alterations. Owing to this careful conservation and restoration, medieval as well as younger building phases are still easy to perceive.

— Permanent Delegation of Germany to UNESCO (2015). Old synagogue and Mikveh in Erfurt.

In 2007 a rare and particularly well-preserved Jewish ritual bath, a Mikveh, dating from c. 1250 was discovered by archeologists not far from the Old Synagogue, near Erfurt's Krämerbrücke (Merchants' Bridge). The mikveh has been accessible to visitors on guided tours since September 2011.

== Museum ==
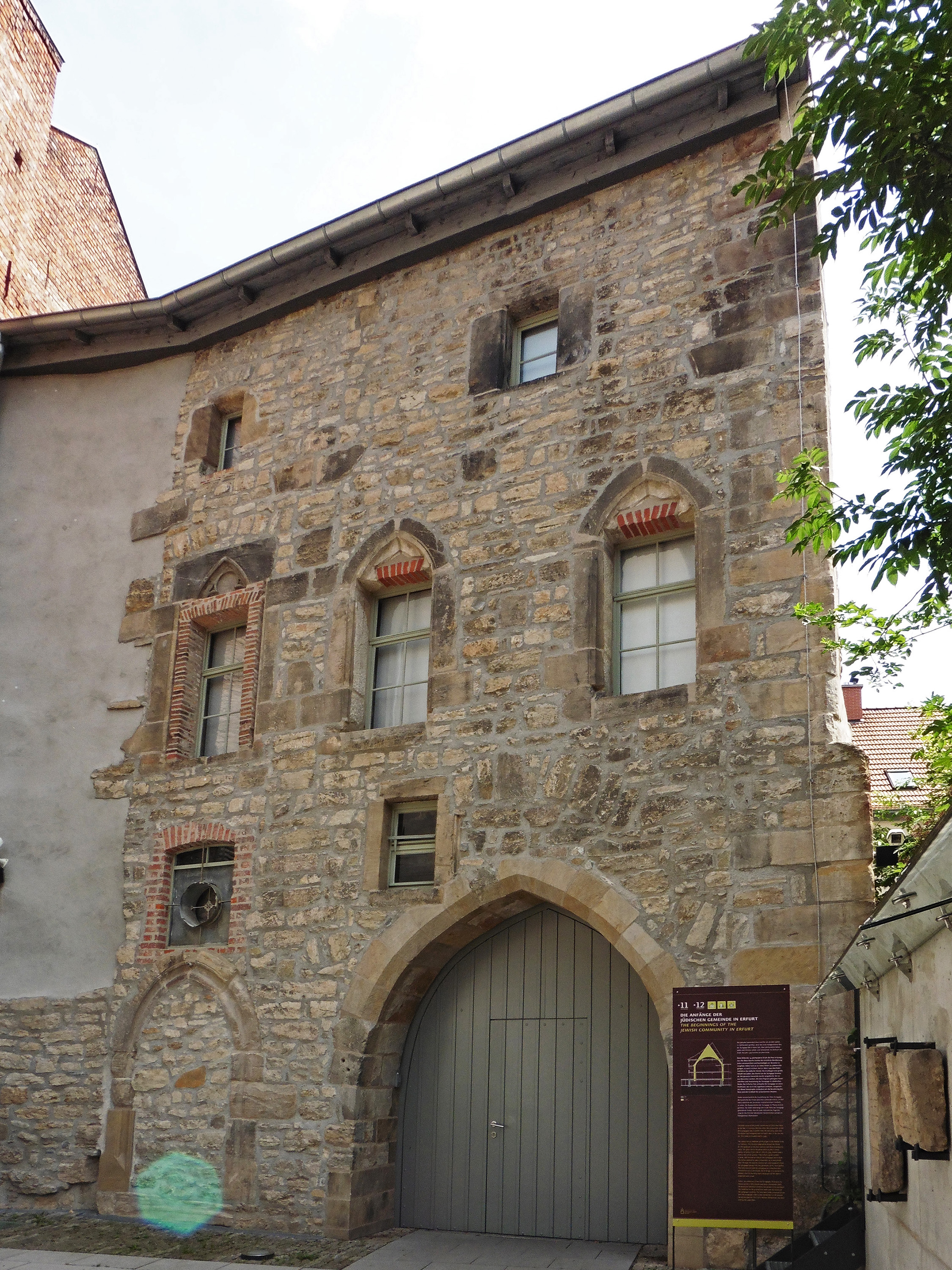
Entrance to the Old Synagogue building from the museum inner courtyard, north-west façade

The Old Synagogue was opened as a museum on 27 October 2009.

The museum permanently houses the Erfurt Treasure, a hoard of 3141 silver coins, weighing 24 kilograms (53 lb), and over 700 pieces of goldsmiths' work and jewellery that is thought to have belonged to Jews who hid them at the time of the Erfurt massacre in 1349. The collection, which weighs almost 30 kilograms (66 lb) in total, was found in 1998 in the wall of a house at Michaelisstraße 43, in a medieval Jewish neighbourhood, near the Synagogue. The treasure has been exhibited in Berlin, Paris, London, New York and Tel Aviv.

It also displays facsimiles of the Erfurt Hebrew Manuscripts, a collection of significant religious texts dating from the 12th–14th century. They came into the possession of Erfurt City Council after the Erfurt Massacre, and in the late 17th century ended up in the library of the Lutheran Evangelical Ministry, at Erfurt's former Augustinian Monastery. The Ministry sold them to the Royal Library in Berlin, the present day Berlin State Library, in 1880, where the originals are now kept.

=== Erfurt Tosefta ===
One of the Erfurt Manuscripts is a copy of the Tosefta, a compilation of oral law attributed to tannaim, Jewish scholars who lived in Palestine and Babylonia c. 1-200 CE. Not all scholars agree, but the Tosefta is generally thought to provide interpretation of unclear sections of the Mishnah, the earliest redaction of the Oral Law.

The Tosefta was rarely copied, and the Erfurt Manuscript, from the 12th century, is the oldest of only three known Tosefta manuscripts and the second-most complete.

Moses Samuel Zuckermandl (also Zuckermandel) was the first to point out the importance of MS Erfurt in his seminal study on it published, in German, in 1876.

== Other synagogues in Erfurt ==
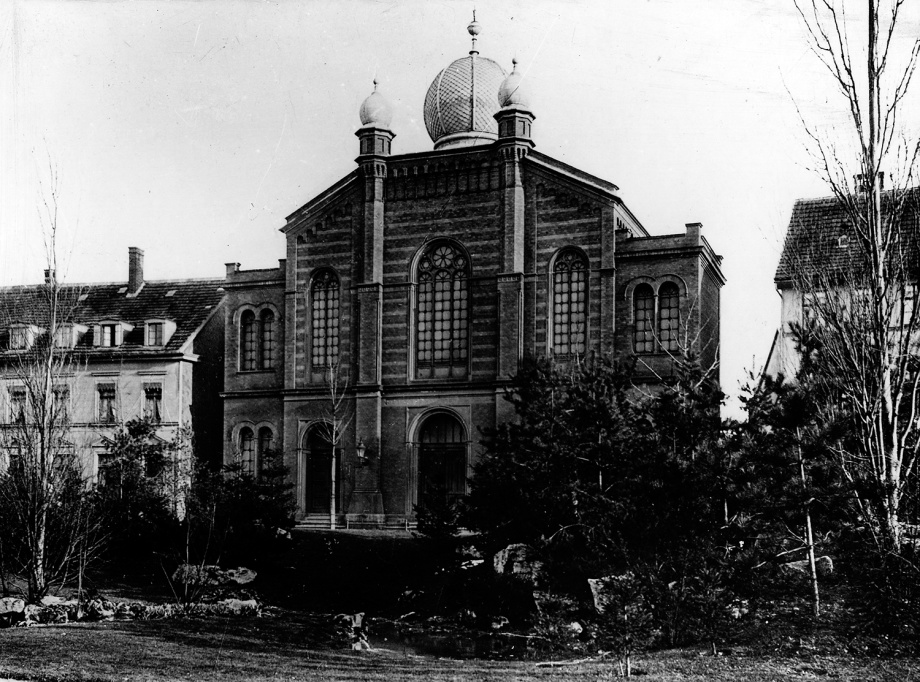
The Große Synagoge, which was destroyed during Kristallnacht

The Kleine Synagoge (Small Synagogue) was built in 1840 and was used until 1884. It was restored in 1998 and it is now used as an events venue. The building features a classically influenced façade and interior.

In 1884 the community constructed the Große Synagoge (Great Synagogue), a magnificent Moorish Revival building. It was destroyed in the Nazi Kristallnacht riots on the night of 9–10 November 1938.

In 1947 the site of the Great Synagogue, which had been confiscated by the Nazis, was returned to the Jewish community by Erfurt City Council. The Neue Synagoge (New Synagogue), which was built on the site, opened on 31 August 1952. The new building was funded by the GDR government and was the only completely new synagogue ever built in the country.

It is the New Synagogue which is used for worship by the present-day Jewish community in Erfurt; it was set on fire by a group of neo-Nazis in April 2000.

=== Gallery ===
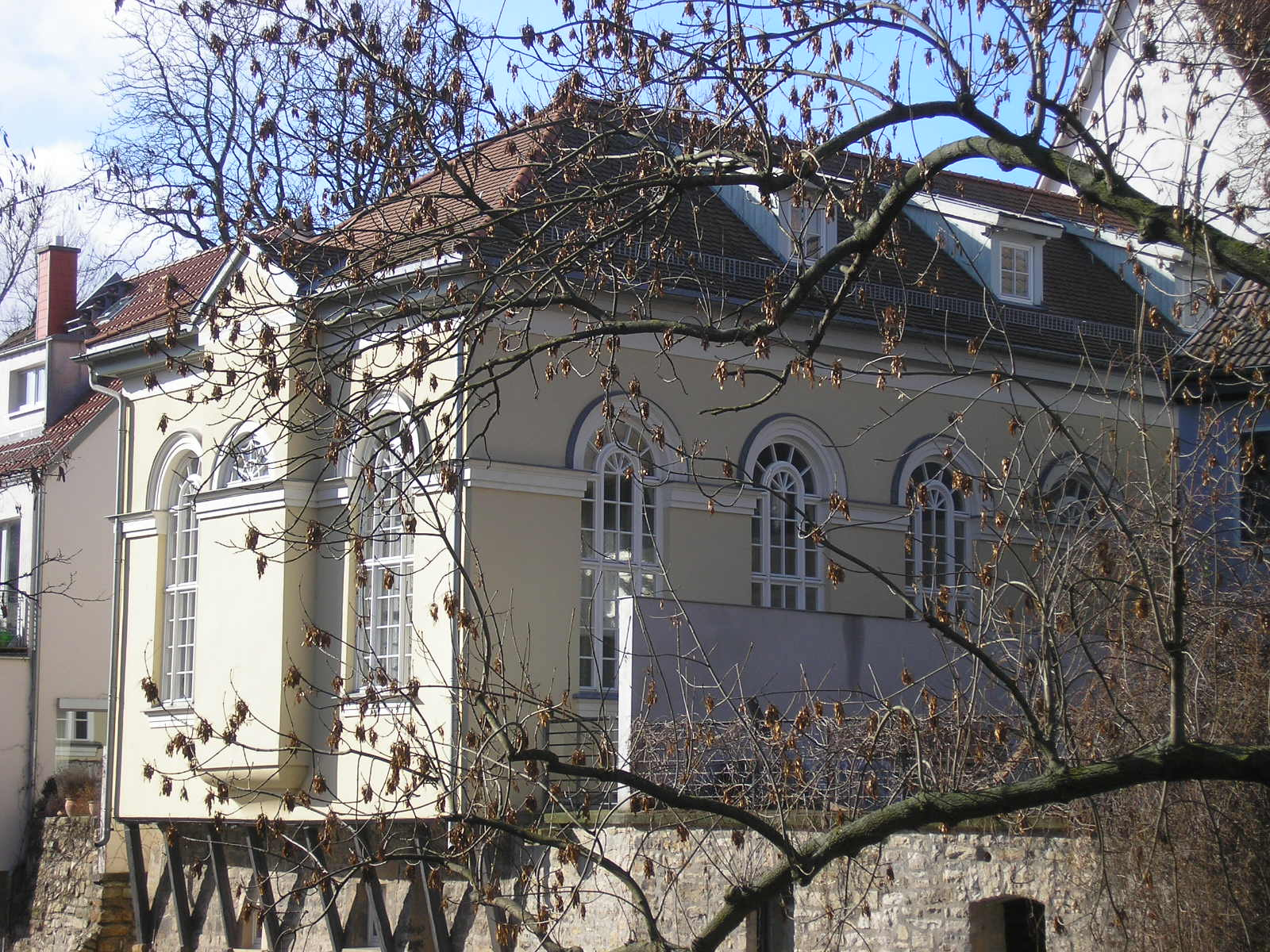
Kleine Synagoge

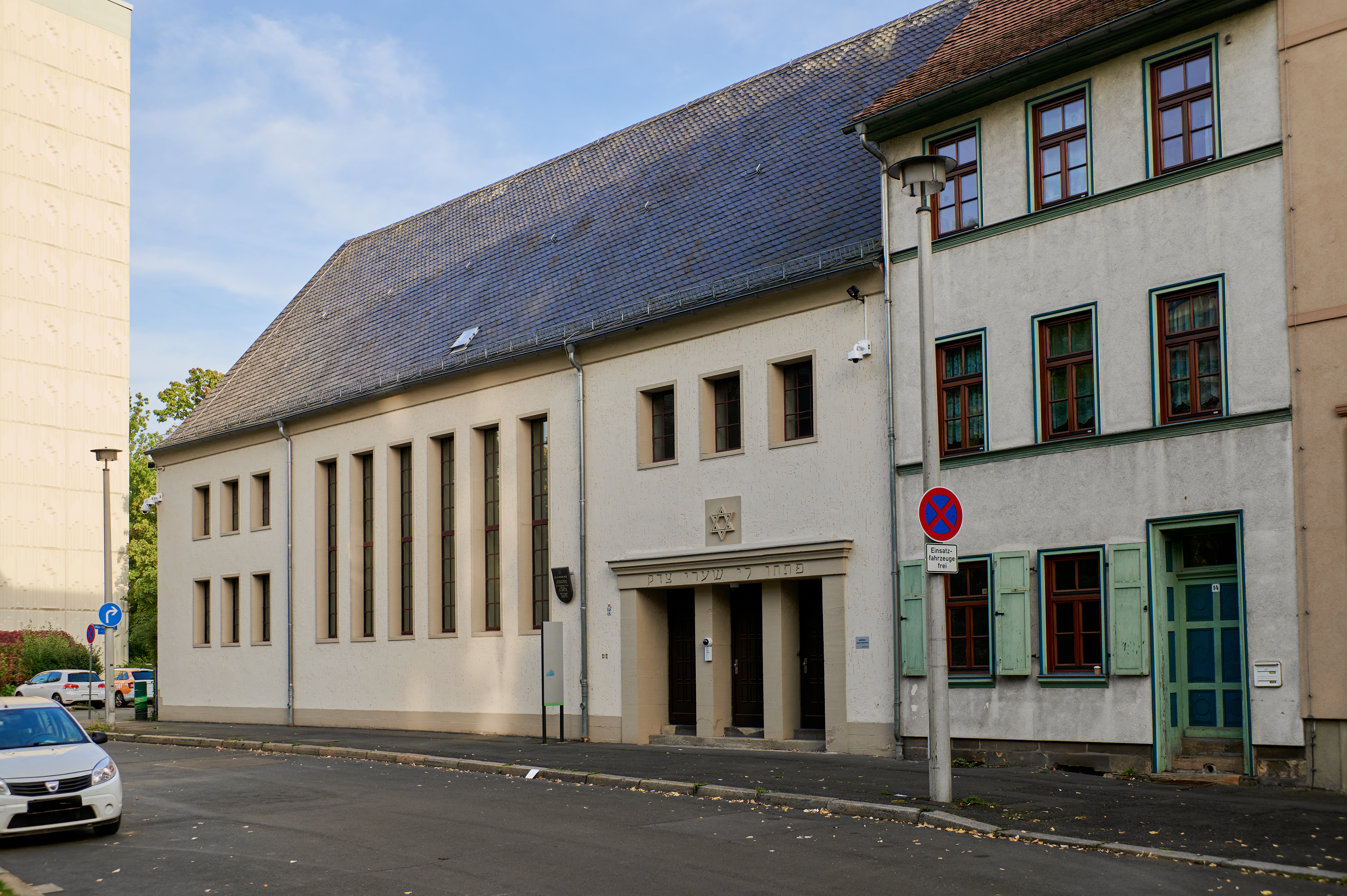
New Synagogue

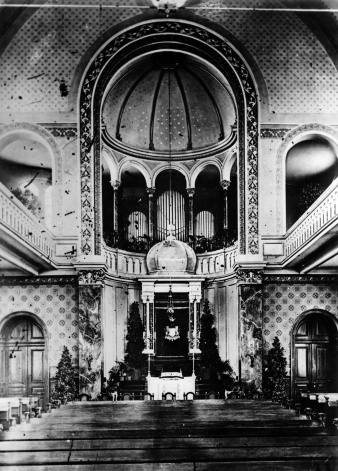
Große Synagoge interior

== See also ==
- History of the Jews in Germany
- Jewish Community of Erfurt
- List of synagogues in Germany (in German)
- Oldest synagogues in the world
