= Colmar Treasure =

Treasure hoard found in France

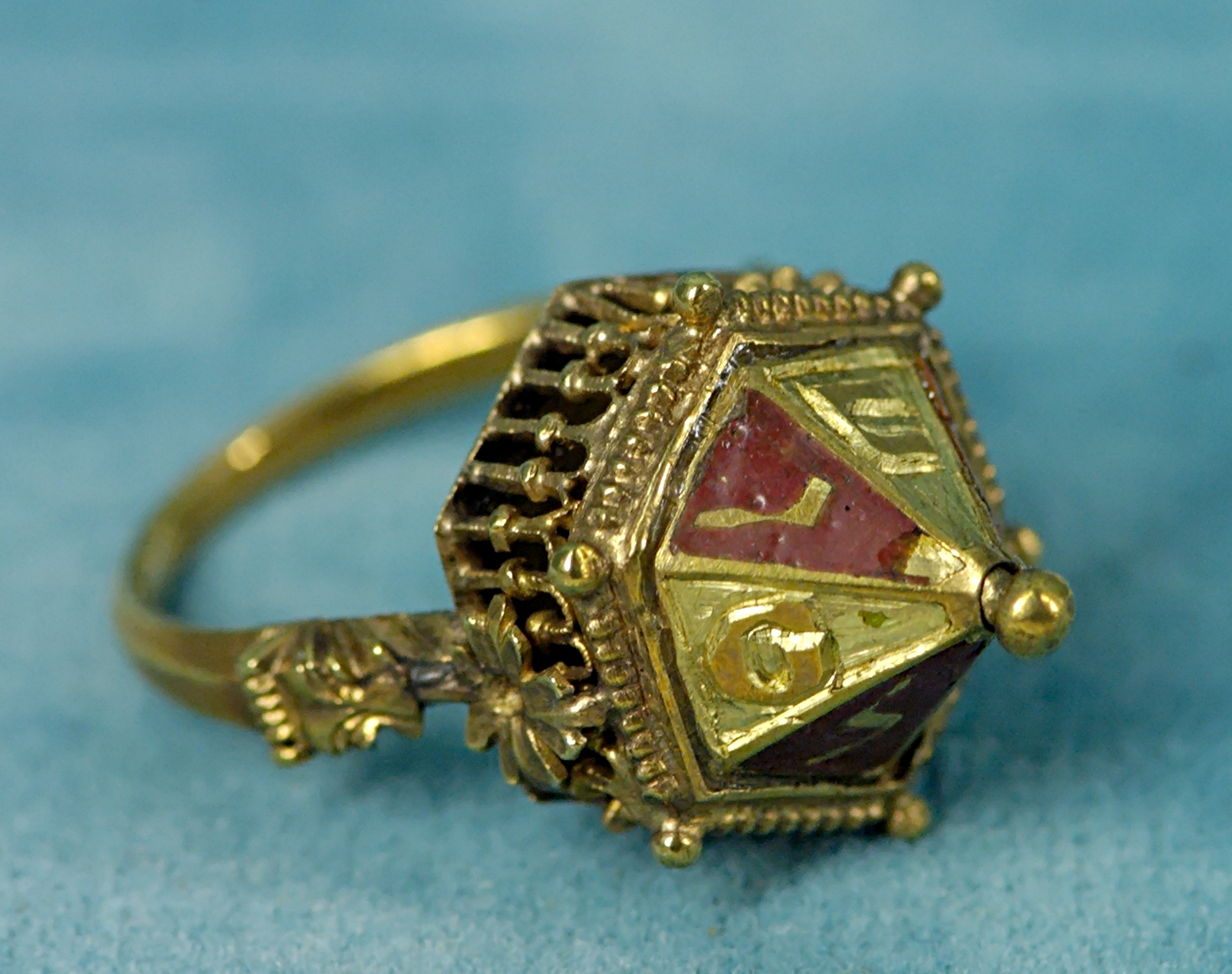
- Jewish wedding ring. Chased and enameled gold and filigrees, early 14th century, found at Colmar (Alsace, France) in 1863
- Material: Gold, silver, bronze, iron
- Created: 14th century
- Period/culture: Middle Ages
- Discovered: Colmar, Alsace, France, 1863
- Present location: Musée de Cluny, Paris; Unterlinden Museum, Colmar

The Colmar Treasure or Colmar hoard is a hoard of precious objects buried by Jews of the Holy Roman Empire at the time of the Black Death pogroms.

The Treasure was found in 1863 in the wall of a house in the medieval rue des Juifs, in Colmar, Alsace. It is believed that some of the items were sold by the discoverers before the full extent of the Treasure could be recorded. The treasures that survive are mostly in the collection of the Musée de Cluny, with a couple of items in the Unterlinden Museum. It was fully published only in 1999, when exhibited in Colmar.

The Treasure includes one of the few surviving examples of a Jewish marriage ring, with the bezel in the form of a small building instead of a precious stone, in accord with the requirement in Jewish law that wedding rings be made as one piece.

The Treasure includes silver coins, silver table ware, and gold and silver jewelry including elaborate belt buckles and fifteen silver rings.

In 2019 the Treasure was exhibited at The Cloisters, part of New York's Metropolitan Museum of Art.

== See also ==
- Erfurt Treasure
- History of Jews in Alsace
