= Black Death in medieval culture =

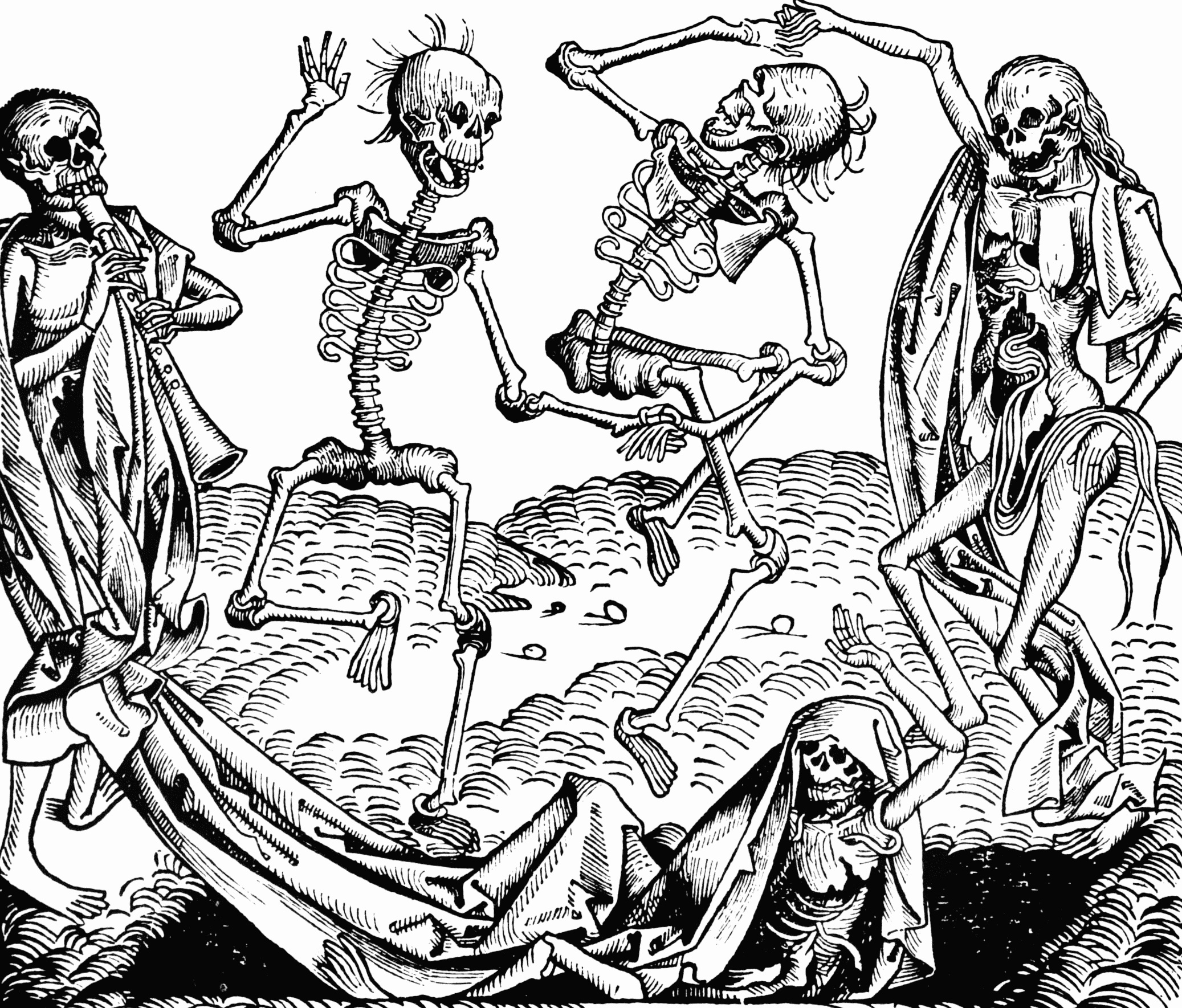
Inspired by Black Death, The Dance of Death is an allegory on the universality of death and a common painting motif in late medieval period.

The Black Death (1346–1353) had great effects on the art and literature of medieval societies that experienced it.

Although contemporary chronicles are often regarded by historians as the most realistic portrayals of the Black Death, the effects of such a large-scale shared experience on the population of Europe influenced poetry, prose, stage works, music and artwork throughout the period. This resulted in evident writers such as Chaucer, Boccaccio, and Petrarch, and artists such as Holbein.

== Chronicles ==
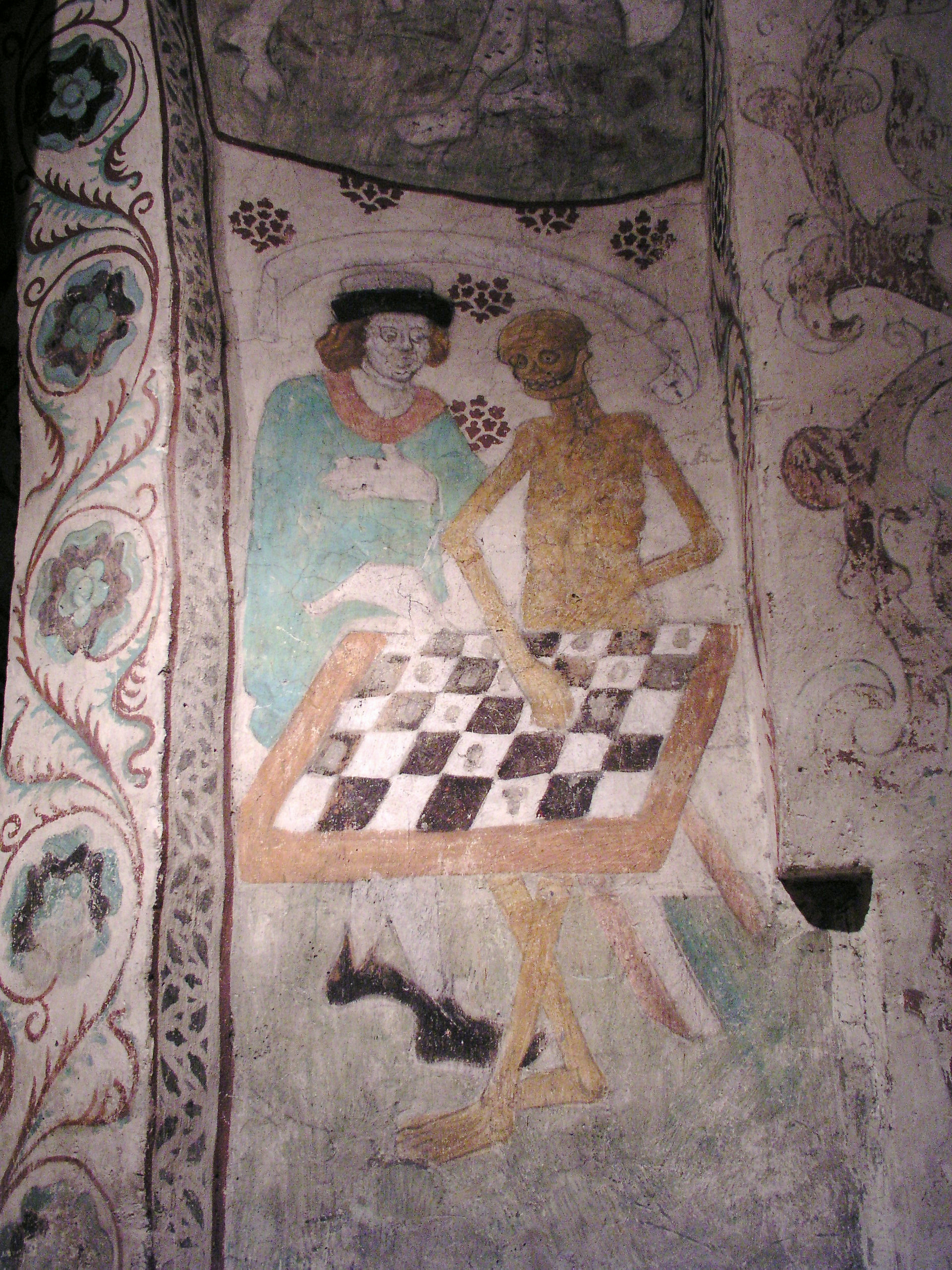
Man playing chess with death in a c. 1480 mural by Albertus Pictor in Täby church in Sweden

Much of the most useful manifestations of the Black Death in literature and to historians comes from the accounts of its chroniclers; contemporary accounts are often the only real way to get a sense of the horror of living through a disaster on such a scale. A few of these chroniclers were famous writers, philosophers and rulers (like Boccaccio and Petrarch). Their writings, however, did not reach the majority of the European population. For example, Petrarch's work was read mainly by wealthy nobles and merchants of Italian city-states. He wrote hundreds of letters and vernacular poetry of great distinction and passed on to later generations a revised interpretation of courtly love. There was, however, one troubadour, writing in the lyric style long out of fashion, who was active in 1348. Peire Lunel de Montech composed the sorrowful sirventes "Meravilhar no·s devo pas las gens" during the height of the plague in Toulouse.

Although romances continued to be popular throughout the period, the courtly tradition began to face increasing competition from ordinary writers who became involved in producing gritty realist literature, inspired by their Black Death experiences. This was a new phenomenon, made possible because vernacular education and literature, as well as the study of Latin and classical antiquity, flourished widely, making the written word steadily more accessible during the fourteenth century. For example, Agnolo di Tura, of Siena, records his experience:

Father abandoned child, wife husband, one brother another; for this illness seemed to strike through the breath and sight. And so they died. And none could be found to bury the dead for money or friendship. Members of a household brought their dead to a ditch as best they could, without priest, without divine offices ... great pits were dug and piled deep with the multitude of dead. And they died by the hundreds both day and night ... And as soon as those ditches were filled more were dug ... And I, Agnolo di Tura, called the Fat, buried my five children with my own hands. And there were also those who were so sparsely covered with earth that the dogs dragged them forth and devoured many bodies throughout the city. There was no one who wept for any death, for all awaited death. And so many died that all believed it was the end of the world. This situation continued [from May] until September.

The scene di Tura describes is repeated all across Europe. In Sicily, Gabriele de' Mussi, a notary, tells of the early spread from the Crimea:

Alas! our ships enter the port, but of a thousand sailors hardly ten are spared. We reach our homes; our kindred ... come from all parts to visit us. Woe to us for we cast at them the darts of death! ... Going back to their homes, they in turn soon infected their whole families, who in three days succumbed, and were buried in one common grave. Priests and doctors visiting ... from their duties ill, and soon were ... dead. O death! cruel, bitter, impious death! ... Lamenting our misery, we feared to fly, yet we dared not remain.

Friar John Clyn witnessed its effects in Leinster, after its spread to Ireland in August 1348:

That disease entirely stripped vills, cities, castles and towns of inhabitaints of men, so that scarcely anyone would be able to live in them. The plague was so contagious that thous touching the dead or even the sick were immediately infected and died, and the one confessing and the confessor were together led to the grave ... many died from carbuncles and from ulcers and pustles that could be seen on shins and under the armpits; some died, as if in a frenzy, from pain of the head, others from spitting blood ... In the convent of Minors of Drogheda, twenty five, and in Dublin in the same order, twenty three died ... These cities of Dublin and Drogheda were almost destroyed and wasted of inhabitants and men so that in Dublin alone, from the beginning of August right up to Christmas, fourteen thousand men died ... The pestilence gathered strength in Kilkenny during Lent, for between Christmas day and 6 March, eight Friars Preachers died. There was scarcely a house in which only one died but commonly man and wife with their children and family going one way, namely, crossing to death.

== In literature ==
In addition to these personal accounts, many presentations of the Black Death have entered the general consciousness as great literature. For example, the major works of Boccaccio (The Decameron), Petrarch, Geoffrey Chaucer (The Canterbury Tales), and William Langland (Piers Plowman), which all discuss the Black Death, are generally recognized as some of the best works of their era.

La Danse Macabre, or the Dance of death, was a contemporary allegory, expressed as art, drama, and printed work. Its theme was the universality of death, expressing the common wisdom of the time: that no matter one's station in life, the dance of death united all. It consists of the personified Death leading a row of dancing figures from all walks of life to the grave – typically with an emperor, king, pope, monk, youngster, beautiful girl, all in skeleton-state. They were produced under the impact of the Black Death, reminding people of how fragile their lives were and how vain the glories of earthly life. The earliest artistic example is from the frescoed cemetery of the Church of the Holy Innocents in Paris (1424). There are also works by Konrad Witz in Basel (1440), Bernt Notke in Lübeck (1463) and woodcuts by Hans Holbein the Younger (1538). Israil Bercovici claims that the Danse Macabre originated among Sephardic Jews in fourteenth century Spain (Bercovici, 1992, p. 27).

The poem "The Rattle Bag" by the Welsh poet Dafydd ap Gwilym (1315–1350 or 1340–1370) has many elements that suggest that it was written as a reflection of the hardships he endured during the Black Death. It also reflects his personal belief that the Black Death was the end of humanity, the Apocalypse, as suggested by his multiple biblical references, particularly the events described in the Book of Revelation.

Adieu, farewell earths blisse,
This world uncertaine is,
Fond are lifes lustful joyes,
Death proves them all but toyes,
None from his darts can flye;
I am sick, I must dye:
Lord, have mercy on us.

— ("A Litany in Time of Plague"
by Thomas Nashe)

Thomas Nashe wrote a sonnet about the plague entitled "A Litany in Time of Plague" which was part of his play Summer's Last Will and Testament (1592). He made countryside visits to remove himself from London in fear of the plague.

Rich men, trust not in wealth,
Gold cannot buy you health;
Physic himself must fade.
All things to end are made,
The plague full swift goes by;
I am sick, I must die.
Lord, have mercy on us!

Beauty is but a flower
Which wrinkles will devour;
Brightness falls from the air;
Queens have died young and fair;
Dust hath closed Helen's eye.
I am sick, I must die.
Lord, have mercy on us!

== Influence on European folklore ==
The Black Death quickly entered common folklore in many European countries. In Northern Europe, the plague was personified as an old, bent woman covered and hooded in black, carrying a broom and a rake. Norwegians told that if she used the rake, some of the population involved might survive, escaping through the teeth of the rake. On the other hand, if she used the broom, then the entire population in the area were doomed. The Plague-hag, or Pesta, were vividly drawn by the painter Theodor Kittelsen.

== Influence on women ==
Women during and after the Black Death also benefited from the growing importance of vernacular literature because a broader cultural forum became available to them which had previously been restricted to men by the Latin church. And so, they began writing and fostering through patronage the writings and translations of others. For example, in France, Christine de Pizan (1364–1430) became the first woman in Europe to support herself by writing. She wrote in many different literary forms, such as an autobiography and books of moral advice for men and women, as well as poetry on a wide range of topics. In her treatise The Letter to the God of Love, she responded to Jean de Meun's anti-woman writings found in his conclusion of Romance of the Rose. Her treatise marked the first instance in European history where a woman was able to respond to such diatribes in writing. It also led to a debate among de Meun and Pizan sympathizers which lasted until the sixteenth century.

== Celebrations ==
Some communities put on dances or other celebrations, either to cheer people up in dire times, or in a superstitious attempt to ward off the disease. According to the (discredited) tradition in Munich, these included the Schäfflertanz (barrel-maker's dance) and the Metzgersprung (butcher's jump), which are still performed there and in other cities.

== See also ==
- Plague doctor
- Beak doctor costume
- Plague doctor contract
- Jewish persecutions during the Black Death
- Erfurt massacre (1349)
