= Alexander Suslin =

German rabbi (died 1349)

Alexander Suslin (or Alexander Süsslein) HaKohen (died 1349) was a prominent 14th century rabbinic authority born in Erfurt, Germany, and one of the most important Talmudists of his time. He was rabbi first in Cologne and Worms, and then moved to Frankfort-on-the-Main. He authored Sefer HaAguddah (ספר האגודה, "Book of the Collection"), a halakhic work (structured by the order of the Talmud's tractates) which was highly regarded by later rabbinic authorities. He was killed in the Erfurt massacre of 1349 during the Black Death era massacres of hundreds of Jewish communities throughout Europe.

== Aguddah ==
Suslin authored the book Aguddah (אגודה "Collection"). In concise fashion it enumerates the most important legal decisions, based on Talmudic law, made by preceding rabbinical authorities. Its purpose is to render such decisions accessible for guidance in their practical application. A comparison of the Aguddah with Jacob ben Asher's Arba'ah Turim, written at the same time in Spain, reveals the deficiencies of the German Jews of that day in matters of method and systematization. While Jacob ben Asher, despite his having partially discarded Maimonides' order and method, exhibited in his Yad HaHazaka, presents a comparatively concise compendium of the laws in use, the Aguddah shows a conglomeration of legal enactments and personal comments on the Talmud – in which much foreign matter is interspersed.

Among the German Jews, however, the Aguddah received a cordial welcome, while Sephardic Jews have almost absolutely ignored it. Such authorities of the beginning of the fifteenth century as Jacob Mölln (Maharil) and Jacob Weil considered Suslin's judgments to be decisive. Its reputation is also shown by the fact that extracts from the same were made a hundred years later (Hanau, 1610), under the title of Ḥiddushe Aguddah ("Novellæ from the Aguddah"), comprising a selection from Suslin's own explanations in the Aguddah.

== Downplaying the modern scholar ==
Characteristic of the author, his work, and the period in which he lived is his decision that talmidei chachamim of his era cannot claim the rights and privileges of the class thus named in the Talmud, because nowadays there is no longer any true talmidei chachamim. Suslin evidently acknowledged by this the inferiority of Talmudic learning in his time, and was conscious of his own inferiority.
