= Basel Massacre =

Swiss 14th-century pogrom

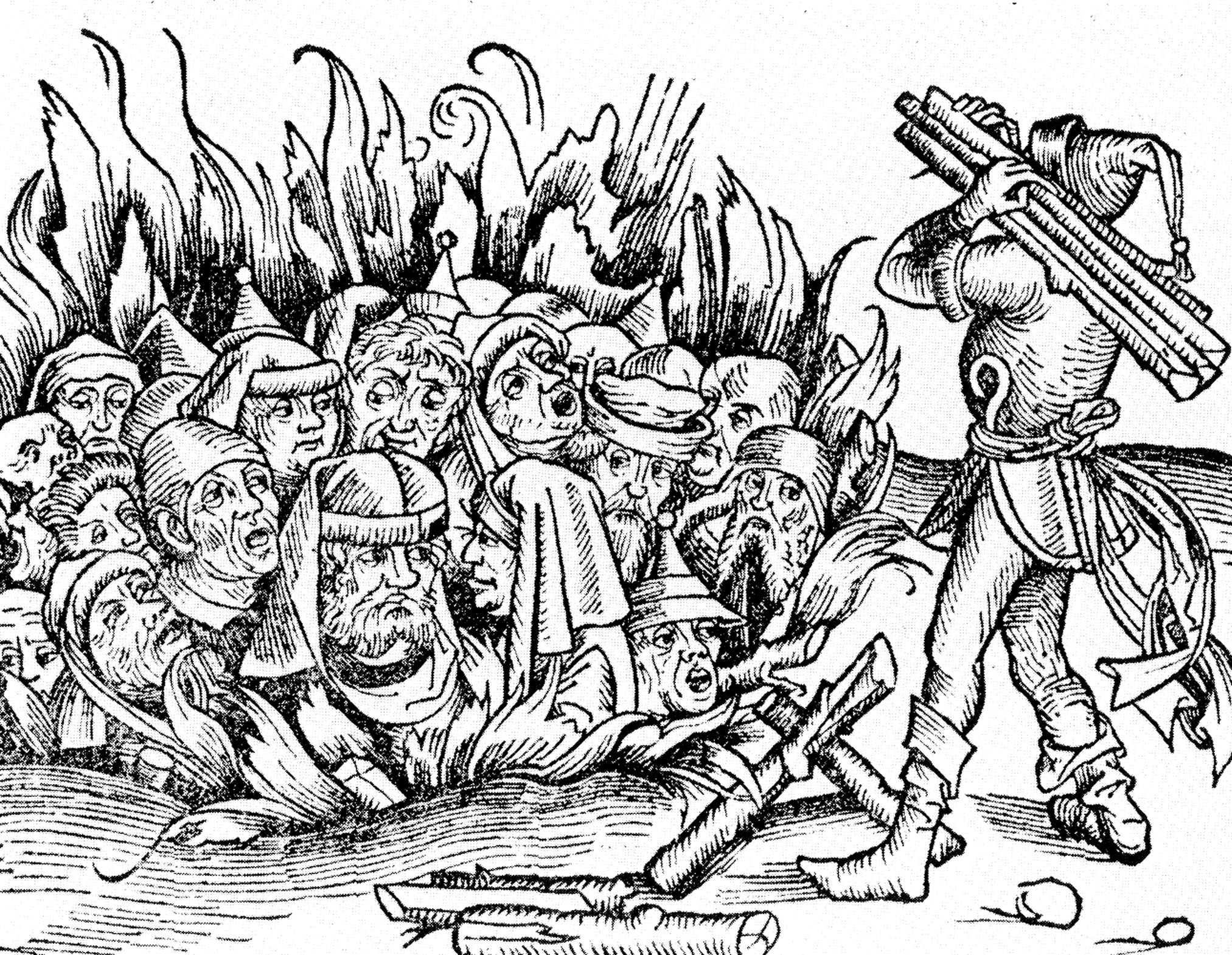
- Burning of the Jews from Hartmann Schedel’s Liber Chronicarum (1493)
- Date: January 16, 1349
- Location: Basel; 47°33′17″N 7°35′26″E
- Cause: Anti-Semitism (Alleged well poisoning)
- Deaths: 300–600 Jews

The Basel Massacre was an anti-Semitic massacre in Basel, which occurred in 1349 in connection with alleged well poisoning as part of the Black Death persecutions, carried out against the Jews in Europe at the time of the Black Death. A number of Jews, variously given as between 300 and 600 (according to contemporary Medieval chronicles) or 50 to 70 (according to some modern historians) were burned alive, after being locked in a wooden structure built on a nearby island in the Rhine. Jewish children were apparently spared, but forcibly baptized and sent to monasteries. The event occurred on January 9.

== Background ==
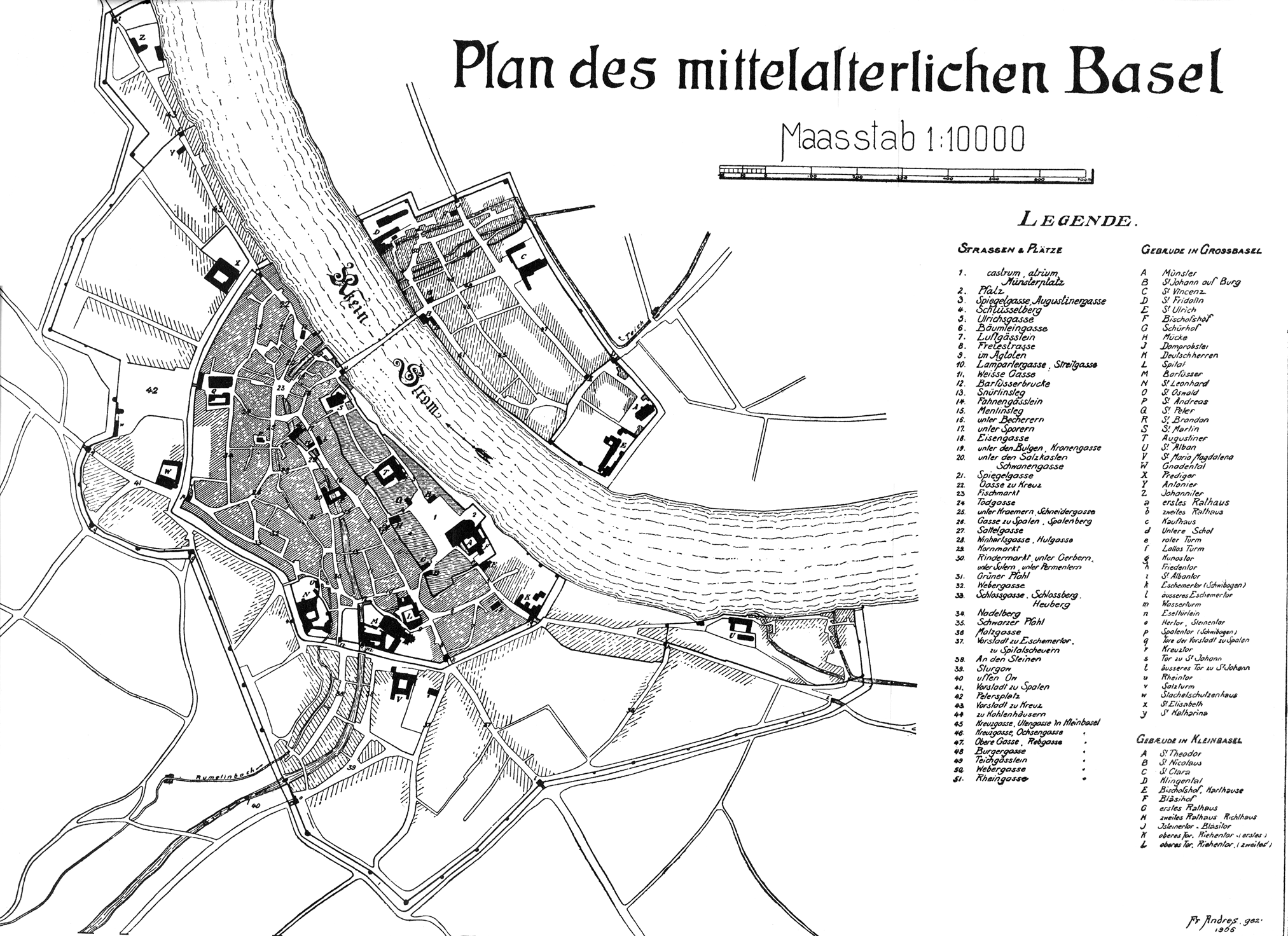
20th century map of Basel in the Middle Ages

The Jews had lived in Basel since at least 1213, when the local community was one of the largest in Europe. The community grew, and by the middle of the 14th century it featured 19 houses and a synagogue. After they had attacked the Jews in their own domains, other cities wrote to Basel, urging them to burn their Jews as well. With the spread of the Black Death in the 14th century, there were pogroms against Jews triggered by rumours of well poisoning, which contributed to the anti-Semitic sentiment. Although the rumors of well-poisoning certainly played a part in fueling anti-Semitic sentiment in Basel, "the immediate background to the persecution related to social and political problems"; some Basel nobles had indeed been temporarily banished from the city on the basis of what was believed to be false testimony provided by the Jews (Ac quibusdam eciam nobilibus Basilee pro quandam iniura Iudeis illata ad logum tempus bannitis). The hatred for the Jews by the lower classes stemmed from their belief the Jews were "allied" with the nobles, to whom they often loaned money, and with whom the workers were in contention in the struggle for power. The fact that the commoners supported the nobles on this occasion indicates the complexity of Basel's social structure. The commoners probably supported the nobles because among them there were some who supported their cause, probably someone with some claim to nobility. Already at Christmas 1348, before the plague had reached Basel, the Jewish cemetery was destroyed and a number of Jews fled the city.

In January 1349, there was a meeting between the bishop of Strasbourg and representatives of the cities of Strasbourg, Freiburg and Basel to coordinate their policy in face of the rising tide of attacks against the Jews in the region, who were nominally under imperial protection.

== The Massacre ==
A mob of members of the guilds burst into the Basel city hall, demanding that the exiled nobles be allowed to return. Basel's massacre of Jews seems to have been premeditated, as suggested by the fact the mob was carrying banners, indicating that the action was thought up in advance. Further, the construction of the wooden structure in which the Jews would be burned took time, another indication of a premeditated act.

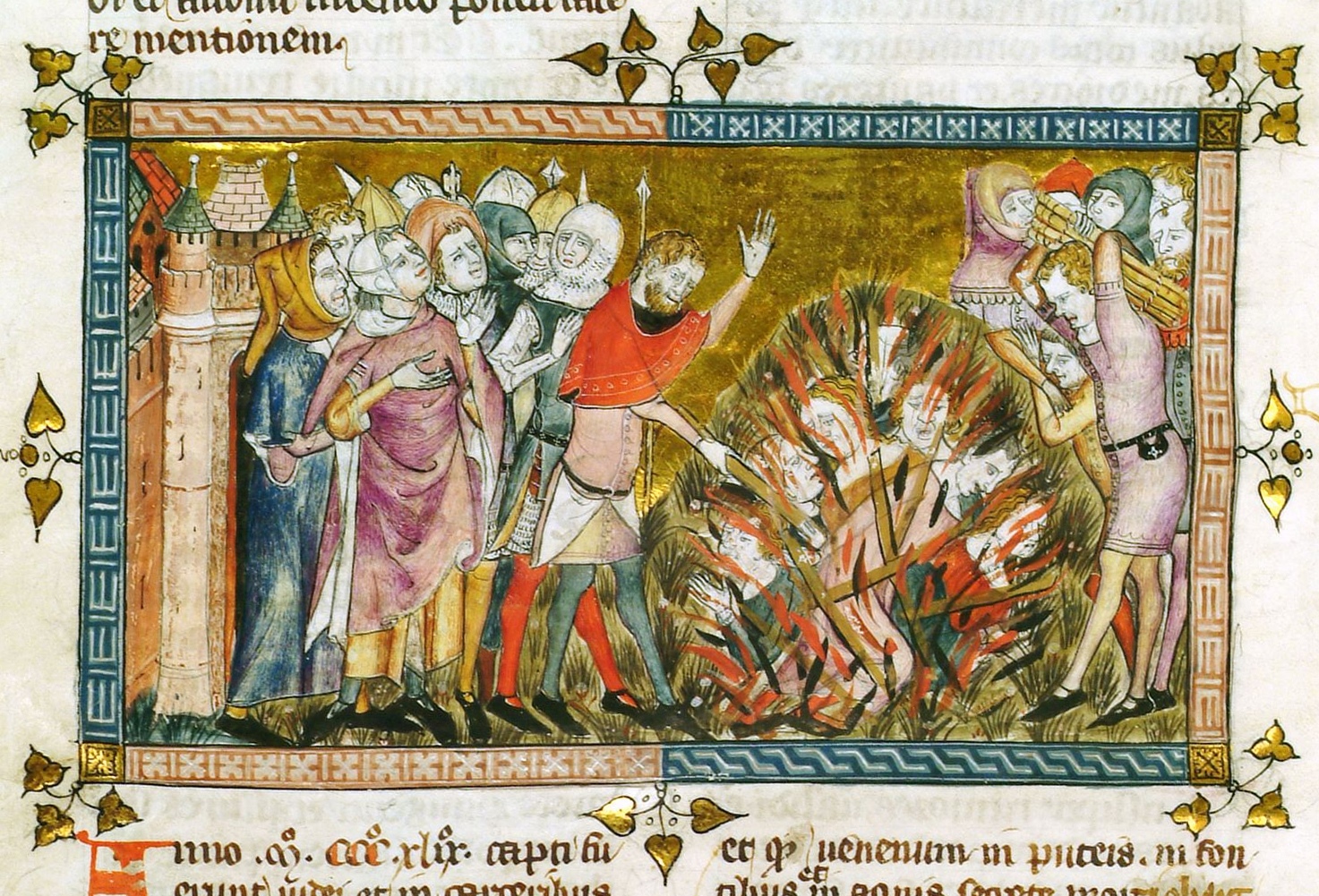
Contemporary representation of an unspecified 1349 burning of the Jews

The intimidated city councilors complied with their request, avowing that no Jew would be allowed to return to the city for 200 years. Without any sort of trial or investigation, the city councilors then ordered the Basel Jews to be exterminated. All the Jews of Basel were taken and locked into a wooden structure. The latter was built on a nearby island in the Rhine, the location of which is unknown, though it was possibly near the mouth of the Birsig, now paved-over. It could also have been a sand bank. On 16 January 1349, the wooden structure was set alight and the Jews locked inside were burned to death or suffocated.

Contemporary chronicler Matthias of Neuenburg describes the event with these words:

“Therefore all the Jews of Basel, without a legal sentence [being passed] and because of the clamor of the people, were burned on an island in the Rhine River in a new house” (Cremati sunt igitur absque sentencia ad clamorem populi omnes Judei Basilienses in una insula Rheni in domo nova).

The newly built house was probably constructed for the purpose of burning the Jews.

The 600 victims mentioned in medieval sources seems to be an inflated number, as such a number of Jews could hardly have lived in Basel Jewish Community's 19 houses. A number of 50 to 70 victims is thought to be plausible by modern historians. Jewish children were apparently spared. However, they would be forcibly baptized and placed in monasteries. According to a list of Jewish martyrs written many years after the incident, 130 of them were baptized. It appears that also a number of adult Jews were spared because they accepted conversion.

Similar pogroms took place in Freiburg on 30 January, and in Strasbourg on 14 February. The massacre had notably taken place before the Black Death had even reached the city. When it finally broke out in April to May 1349, the converted Jews were still blamed for well poisoning. The officials of Basel placed judgement on some baptized Jews, and on 4 July four of them were tortured on the wheel, "confessing" that they had poisoned Basel's fountains (Juden ... Offenlich vor gerichte verjahen und seiten, das sie die brunnen ze unserre state etlich vergift hettent). The remaining converted Jews were partly executed, partly expulsed. By the end of 1349, the Jews of Basel had been murdered, their cemetery destroyed and all debts to Jews declared settled.

== Aftermath ==
Following the expulsion of the Jews in 1349, Basel publicly resolved to not allow any Jews back into the city for at least 200 years. However, less than 15 years later, Jews were allowed back in the wake of the disastrous earthquake of 1356, as loans and funding were needed to rebuild the city. By 1361, Jews were again living in Basel, numbering about 150 out of a total population of some 8,000 in 1370. However, they only lived there until 1397, when the accusations of well poisoning were renewed. The Jews left the city, and city decrees were issued to prevent them from returning. Subsequently, the Jews were expelled from Bern (1427) and Zürich (1436). As for Basel, the only exception were a few Jews who were later allowed to live in the city from the 16th century because they worked for the Hebrew printers. Further, Jewish merchants were allowed to enter the city once a month. The Jews would not return to live in Basel until four centuries later, in 1805.

== See also ==
- History of the Jews in Switzerland
- List of massacres in Switzerland
- Martyrdom in Judaism
- History of the Jews in Basel
