= Erfurt massacre (1349) =

1349 massacre in Erfurt, Germany

- Part of Black Death persecutions
- Location: Erfurt
- Date: March 1349
- Target: Jews
- Attack type: Massacre, pogrom
- Deaths: 100+
- Motive: Allegations that Jews were responsible for the Black Death

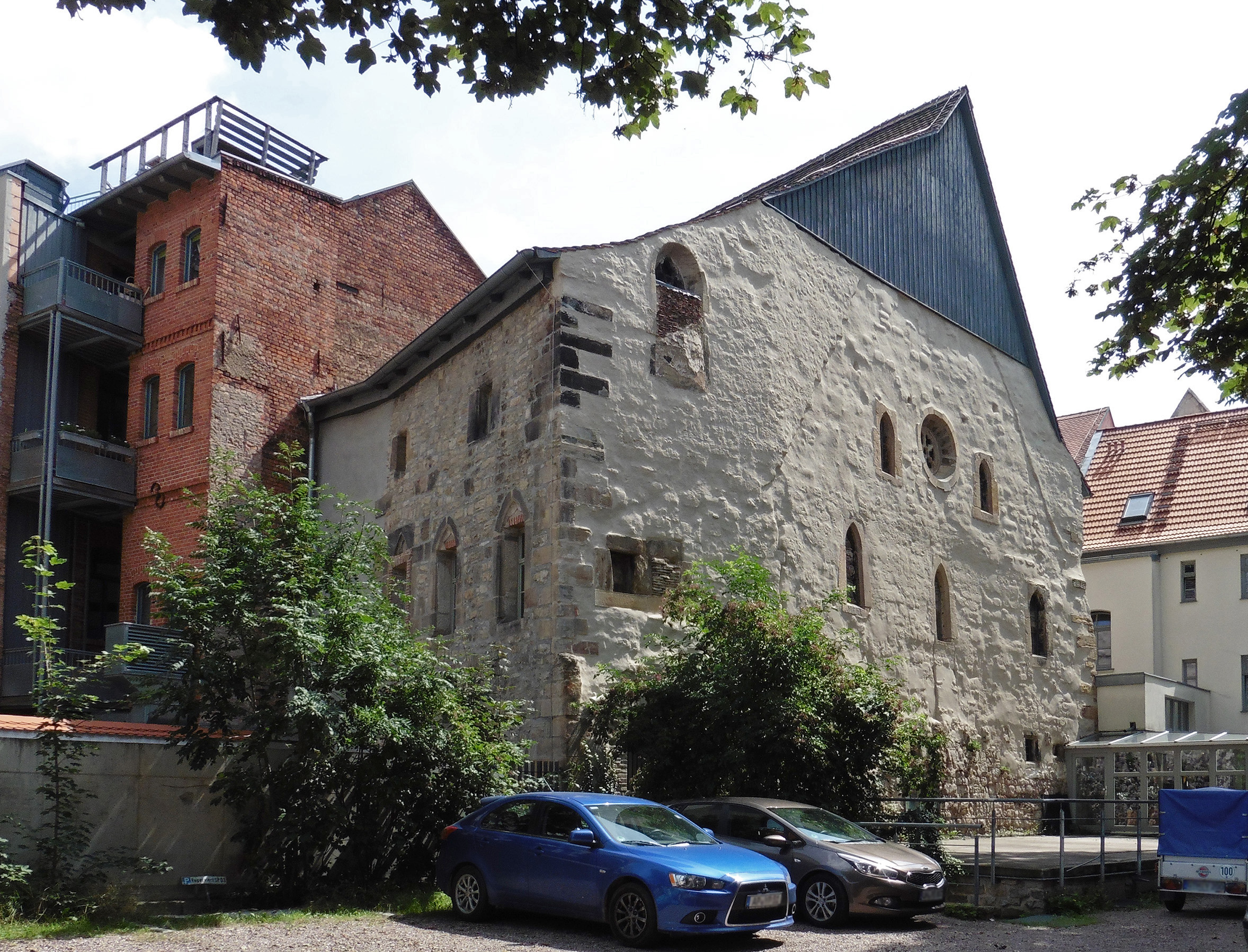
The Erfurt Alte Synagogue

The Erfurt massacre was a massacre of the Jewish community in Erfurt, Germany, on 21–22 March 1349. Accounts of the number of Jews killed in the massacre vary widely from between 100 and up to 3000. Any Jewish survivors were expelled from the city. Some Jews set fire to their homes and possessions and perished in the flames before they could be lynched.

The many Black Death persecutions and massacres that occurred in France and Germany at that time were sometimes in response to accusations that the Jews were responsible for outbreaks of the Black Death, and other times justified with the belief that killing the local Jews would prevent the spread of the Black Death to that locale. Although these beliefs, and the accompanying massacres, were frequently encouraged by local bishops or itinerant Flagellants, the Catholic Church, including Pope Clement VI under whom the Flagellants and the Black Death began, and his successor, Innocent VI, were firmly against it. In a papal bull condemning the Flagellant movement in late 1349, Pope Clement VI criticized their "shedding the blood of Jews". Erfurt later suffered the ravages of the Black Plague, where over 16,000 residents died during a ten-week period in 1350.

Among those murdered was prominent Talmudist Alexander Suslin.

A few years after the 1349 massacre, Jews moved back to Erfurt and founded a second community, which was disbanded by the city council in 1458.

== Erfurt manuscripts ==
Massacres were generally accompanied by extensive looting. The items looted in the Erfurt massacre included the Erfurt manuscripts, written in Hebrew, including a Tosefta, which is now the oldest surviving such manuscript, dating to the 12th century.

After the massacre, the Erfurt manuscripts, including the Tosefta, came into the possession of Erfurt City Council and in the late 17th century ended up in the library of the Lutheran Erfurt Evangelical Church Library, at Erfurt's former Augustinian Monastery. They were found in the church library in 1879 and 16 of these manuscripts were transferred in 1880 to the Royal Library in Berlin, the present day Berlin State Library, where they are now kept, and called the Erfurt Collection. According to one reference, there are bloodstains on the Tosefta manuscript.

Many of the Jews of Erfurt preemptively hid their valuables before the attack. One such hidden cache of valuables probably belonging to merchant Kalman of Wiehe was found in 1998. The cache is now referred to as the Erfurt Treasure and is on permanent display at the newly restored 11th-century Old Synagogue museum in Erfurt.

== See also ==
- Persecution of Jews during the Black Death
- Black Death in medieval culture
- Old Synagogue (Erfurt)
- Erfurt Treasure
- Ethnic cleansing
- History of the Jews in Germany
- Black Death in Germany
- The Holocaust in Germany
