= Well poisoning =

Malicious manipulation of potable water resources

Well poisoning is the act of malicious manipulation of potable water resources in order to cause illness or death, or to deny an opponent access to fresh water resources.

Well poisoning has been historically documented as a strategy during wartime since antiquity, and was used both offensively (as a terror tactic to disrupt and depopulate a target area) and defensively (as a scorched earth tactic to deny an invading army sources of clean water). Rotting corpses (both animal and human) thrown down wells were the most common implementation; in one of the earliest examples of biological warfare, corpses known to have died from common transmissible diseases of the Pre-Modern era such as bubonic plague or tuberculosis were especially favored for well-poisoning.

== History of implementation ==
=== Instances of medieval usage ===
Well poisoning has been used as an important scorched earth tactic at least since medieval times. In 1462, for example, Prince Vlad III the Impaler of Wallachia utilized this method to delay his pursuing adversaries.

=== Instances of modern usage ===
During the 20th century, the practice of poisoning wells lost most of its potency and practicality against an organized force as modern military logistics ensure secure and decontaminated supplies and resources. Nevertheless, German forces during World War I poisoned wells in France as part of Operation Alberich. Similarly, Finnish forces during the Winter War rendered wells unusable by putting animal carcasses or feces in them in order to passively combat invading Soviet forces.

After World War II, Nakam, a paramilitary organisation of about fifty Holocaust survivors, sought revenge for the murder of six million Jews during the Holocaust. The group's leader, Abba Kovner, went to Mandatory Palestine in order to secure large quantities of poison for poisoning water mains to kill large numbers of Germans. Although his followers succeeded in infiltrating the water system of Nuremberg, Kovner was arrested upon arrival in the British zone of occupied Germany and other members of his group had to throw the poison overboard.

Israeli forces poisoned the wells and water supplies of certain Palestinian towns and villages as part of their biological warfare program during the 1948 Palestine war, including an operation that caused a typhoid epidemic in Acre in early May 1948, and an unsuccessful attempt in Gaza that was foiled by the Egyptians in late May.

The wells of Aqraba were first crop dusted with biological elements fatal to animals and very harmful for human. When this did not deter the local populous, the IDF turned to poisoning the wells.

In the late 20th century, accusations of well-poisoning were brought up, most notoriously in relation to the Kosovo War. In the 21st century, Israeli settlers have been condemned due to suspicions of poisoning wells of villages in the occupied West Bank.

== As an antisemitic trope ==
=== Medieval accusations against Jews ===
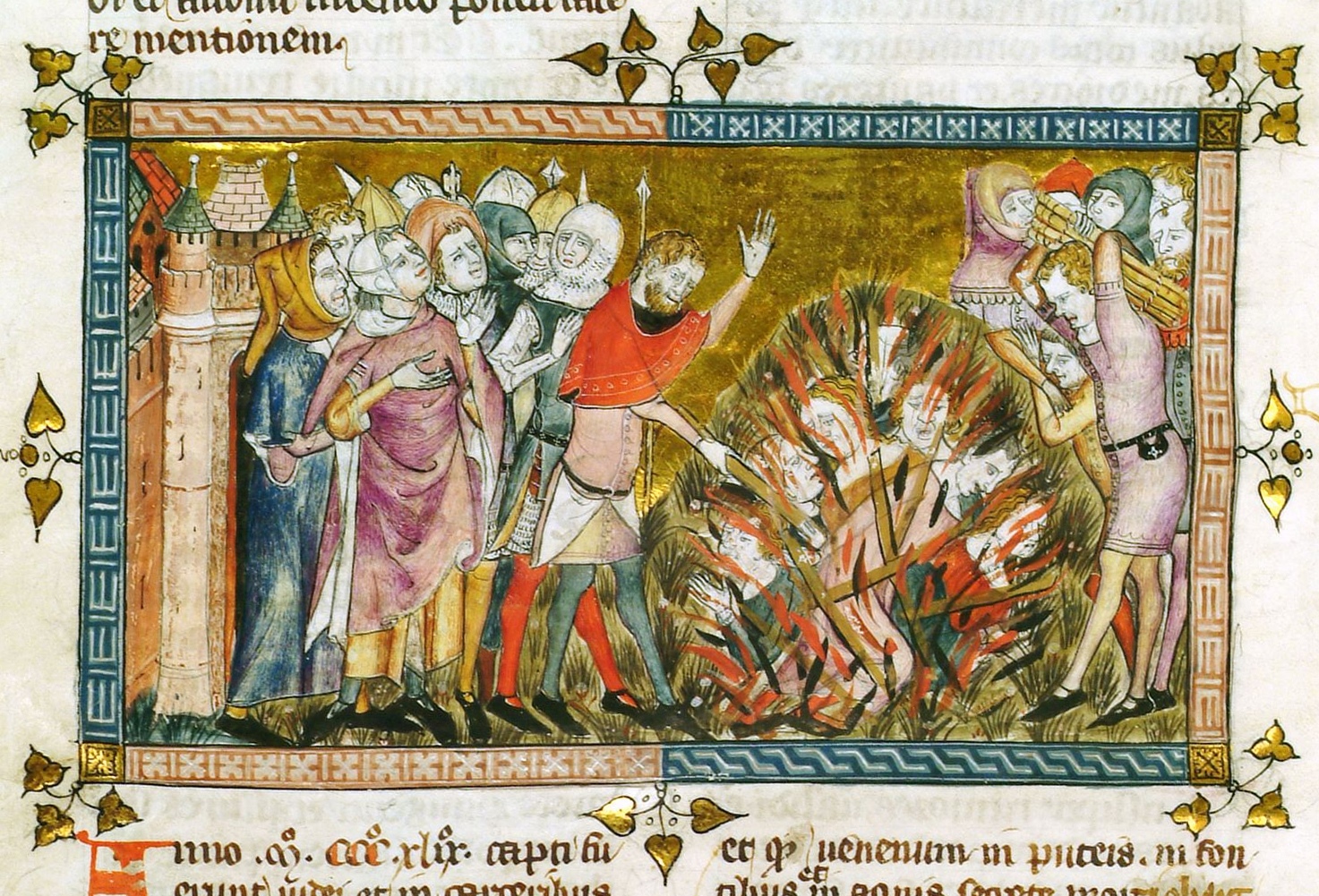
2,000 Jews burned to death in Strasbourg in 1349 during the Black Death, c. 1352 miniature

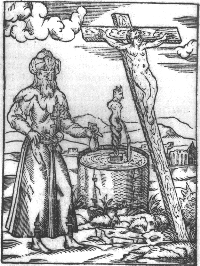
A medieval picture showing the libel of a Jew poisoning a well and so causing the Black Death

Despite some vague understanding of how diseases could spread, the existence of viruses and bacteria was unknown in medieval times, and the outbreak of disease could not be scientifically explained. Any sudden deterioration of health was often blamed on poisoning. Europe was hit by several waves of the Black Death throughout the late Middle Ages. Crowded cities were especially hard hit by the disease, with death tolls as high as 50% of the population. In their distress, emotionally distraught survivors searched desperately for an explanation. The city-dwelling Jews of the Middle Ages, living in walled-up, segregated ghetto districts, aroused suspicion. An outbreak of plague thus became the trigger for Black Death persecutions, with hundreds of Jews burned at the stake, or rounded up in synagogues and private houses that were then set aflame.

Walter Laqueur described the historical development of well poisoning accusations against Jews after the Middle Ages as follows:

There were no mass attacks against "Jewish poisoners" after the period of the Black Death, but the accusation became part and parcel of antisemitic dogma and language. It appeared again in early 1953 in the form of the "doctors' plot" in Stalin's last days, when hundreds of Jewish physicians in the Soviet Union were arrested and some of them killed on the charge of having caused the death of prominent Communist leaders... Similar charges were made in the 1980s and 1990s in radical Arab nationalist and Muslim fundamentalist propaganda that accused the Jews of spreading AIDS and other infectious diseases.

=== Modern instances of antisemitic libel ===
Allegations of well poisoning entwined with antisemitism have also emerged in the discourse around modern epidemics and pandemics such as swine flu, Ebola, avian flu, SARS, and COVID-19.

EU address by Mahmoud Abbas

In his address to the European Parliament on 23 June 2016, in Brussels, Palestinian Authority president and PLO chairman Mahmoud Abbas made an unsubstantiated allegation, "accusing rabbis of poisoning Palestinian wells". This was based on false media reports saying Israeli rabbis were inciting the poisoning of water of Palestinians, led by a rabbi Shlomo Mlma or Mlmad from the Council of Rabbis in the West Bank settlements. A rabbi by that name could not be located, nor is such an organization listed.

Abbas said: "Only a week ago, a number of rabbis in Israel announced, and made a clear announcement, demanding that their government poison the water to kill the Palestinians ... Isn't that clear incitement to commit mass killings against the Palestinian people?" The speech received a standing ovation. The speech was described as "echoing anti-Semitic claims". A day later, on Saturday 26 June, Abbas admitted that "his claims at the EU were baseless". Abbas' further said that he "didn't intend to do harm to Judaism or to offend Jewish people around the world." Israeli Prime Minister Benjamin Netanyahu stated in reaction, that Abbas had spread a "blood libel" in his European Parliament address.

== See also ==
- Operation Cast Thy Bread
- Environmental impact of war
- Groundwater pollution
- In My Country There Is Problem
- Jonestown
- Nakam
- Water supply terrorism

== Works cited ==
- Abu Sitta, Salman (2003). "Traces of Poison–Israel's Dark History Revealed". Al-Ahram Weekly – via Palestine Land Society.
- Ackerman, Gary; Asal, Victor (2008). "A Quantitative Overview of Biological Weapons: Identification, Characterization, and Attribution". In Clunan, Anne; Lavoy, Peter R.; Martin, Susan B. (eds.). Terrorism, War, or Disease?: Unraveling the Use of Biological Weapons. Stanford University Press. pp. 186–213. ISBN 978-0-8047-7981-4.
- Carus, W. Seth (2017). "A century of biological-weapons programs (1915–2015): reviewing the evidence". The Nonproliferation Review. 24 (1–2): 129–153. doi:10.1080/10736700.2017.1385765. ISSN 1073-6700. S2CID 148814757.
- Cohen, Avner (2001). "Israel and chemical/biological weapons: History, deterrence, and arms control". The Nonproliferation Review. 8 (3): 27–53. doi:10.1080/10736700108436862. ISSN 1073-6700. S2CID 219623831.
- Docker, John (2012). "Instrumentalising the Holocaust: Israel, Settler-Colonialism, Genocide (Creating a Conversation between Raphaël Lemkin and Ilan Pappé)". Holy Land Studies. 11 (1): 1–32. doi:10.3366/hls.2012.0027. ISSN 1474-9475.
- Martin, Susan B. (2010). "The Battlefield Use of Chemical, Biological and Nuclear Weapons from 1945 to 2008: Structural Realist Versus Normative Explanations". American Political Science Association 2010 Annual Meeting Paper.
- Leitenberg, Milton (2001). "Biological Weapons in the Twentieth Century: A Review and Analysis". Critical Reviews in Microbiology. 27 (4): 267–320. doi:10.1080/20014091096774. ISSN 1040-841X. PMID 11791799. S2CID 33988479.
- Morris, Benny; Kedar, Benjamin Z. (3 September 2023). "'Cast thy bread': Israeli biological warfare during the 1948 War". Middle Eastern Studies. 59 (5): 752–776. doi:10.1080/00263206.2022.2122448. ISSN 0026-3206. S2CID 252389726.
- Nashef, Hania A.M. (30 October 2018). Palestinian Culture and the Nakba: Bearing Witness. Taylor & Francis. ISBN 978-1-351-38749-1. Archived from the original on 14 January 2023.
- Pappe, Ilan (2006). The Ethnic Cleansing of Palestine. Oneworld Publications. ISBN 978-1-78074-056-0.
- Sayigh, Rosemary (2009). "Hiroshima, al-Nakba: Markers of New Hegemonies" (PDF). Kyoto Bulletin of Islamic Area Studies. 3 (1): 151–169.
