= The Armenians: A Story of Survival =

2001 PBS documentary

The Armenians: A Story of Survival is a 2001 PBS documentary film exploring the history of Armenians from the 4th century to the present. The movie was made to commemorate 1700 years since the Armenians established the first and earliest Christian nation to exist. The main focus of the documentary is how the Armenians have managed to survive, remember, and acknowledge their complex history.

It was written and directed by Andrew Goldberg (who also directed The Armenian Genocide in 2006) and narrated by Olympia Dukakis. Goldberg interviewed various scholars, survivors, then-incumbent President of Armenia Robert Kocharyan, and the head of the Armenian Church, Catholicos Karekin II.

== Plot Summary ==
The documentary opens with Armenia's early invasions by neighboring Muslim countries following the spread of Islam in the Middle East, leaving Armenia as a Christian society surrounded by Muslim states. This later evolved into the fusion of the Ottoman Empire, where Armenians, Greeks, Jews, and other minority groups were awarded their own communities with sets of rules and independently established authority. This era was marked by cultural interactions between the Ottoman Armenians and Muslim Turks that highlighted degrees of religious tolerance, acceptability, and, oftentimes, prosperity amongst the Armenian population. As the Ottoman Empire began to decline drastically, so did its treatment of Armenians. Fearing that the Ottoman Armenians would join their Russian enemies after the Turks launched a military campaign against Russia, the Ottoman government launched deportation campaigns that initiated the mass murder of around 600,000-1.5 million people, known as the Armenian genocide. As a result of this catastrophic event, Armenians have struggled to rebuild their lives in the diaspora.

== Reception ==
Sarkis Sarkissian, a member of Goldberg's Two Cats Production Company, wrote that rather than creating a greater rift over genocide, Goldberg attributed many Armenians as being helpful towards the filming process and, more so, supported the idea of their history being documented with no interference. Presenting the whole history of Armenia to wider audiences would help to combat genocide denial..

Mitchell Peters, a Staff Writer for the Armenian Studies Program at California State University, Fresno praised the emotion and nature of story-telling depicted in the film, making it a film for Armenians to reflect their culture on and non-Armenians to gain historical knowledge from.

Through the praise and satisfaction of telling the story of Armenians, the documentary was awarded the CINE Golden Eagle Award in 2002 and the St. Joachim and Anne Humanitarian Award in 2003.
