= The Armenian Genocide =

The Armenian Genocide can refer to:

- The general topic of the Armenian genocide
- The 2006 PBS documentary titled The Armenian Genocide
