= A Yiddish World Remembered =

- Directed by: Andrew Goldberg
- Narrated by: Elliott Gould
- Release date: 2002
- Running time: 60 min.
- Language: English

A Yiddish World Remembered is a 2002 Emmy-award-winning documentary by Andrew Goldberg that uses archival photographs, never-before-seen archival videos, and survivor testimony to reconstruct the Jewish communities of Eastern Europe, which were destroyed by the Holocaust. Oscar nominated actor Elliott Gould narrates.

== Summary ==
Long before the Holocaust, antisemitism threatened Eastern European Jews. Many Jews immigrated to the region after having been expelled from Western Europe during the 15th and 16th centuries, and their communities only became more concentrated when the Russian government confined them to the area, specifically the nations of modern-day Latvia, Lithuania, Poland, Belarus, Ukraine, Slovakia, and parts of northern Hungary.

Once they were settled, the Jews still weren't safe. A never-before-seen film shot in the 1920s reveals the aftermath of a pogrom, where Cossacks tore through Jewish neighborhoods raping, maiming, killing, and looting.

But terror and hostility unified the Jewish community by forcing them to rely on one another. Jews in a shtetl all chipped in to help care for the poor in their community.

The film explores the uniqueness of the Yiddish language. To prove the sting of a Yiddish insult, one survivor says, “May all your teeth fall out, and may one remain as a tooth ache.”

The survivors also talk about the Jewish dishes they enjoyed in their Eastern European homes. “Cherry pierogis are like a dream in my mind,” one survivor says.

They survivors all have nothing but praise for their mothers--balebustes (amazing housewives), who kept the family running. “She didn’t have to go to places to exercise,” one survivor says of his mother, “a machine couldn’t do all that she did.”

== See also ==
- Jewish diaspora
- List of Hasidic dynasties
- List of shtetls and shtots.
- History of the Jews in Russia and the Soviet Union
- History of the Jews in Bessarabia
- History of the Jews in Carpathian Ruthenia
- History of the Jews in Poland
- Luboml: My Heart Remembers
