= Anti-Semitism in the 21st Century: The Resurgence =

2007 documentary film directed by Andrew Goldberg

- Written by: Andrew Goldberg
- Directed by: Andrew Goldberg
- Starring: David Ignatius, Natan Sharansky, Rashid Khalidi, Tony Judt, Hisham Ahmed, Bernard Lewis
- Narrated by: Judy Woodruff
- Country of origin: United States
- Original language: English

Production
- Producer: Andrew Goldberg
- Running time: 60 minutes

Original release
- Network: PBS
- Release: January 8, 2007

Anti-Semitism in the 21st Century: The Resurgence is a documentary film that first aired on PBS on January 8, 2007. It was directed, produced, and written by Andrew Goldberg, and hosted by Judy Woodruff. The film examines the roots of modern antisemitism and why it flourished at the time of its release. The program explores why attacks on Jews in Europe have more than doubled since the 1990s, and its connections to the Arab–Israeli conflict.

The purpose of the program is to explore the origins of antisemitism and why it has surged in recent times. It mainly focuses on antisemitism in the Muslim world and its connections to the Israeli–Palestinian conflict. It explores the history of Islamic antisemitism from pre-Zionism as well as how it has grown since the creation of Israel. The film also explores the similarities between modern Muslim antisemitism and antisemitism in Europe before World War II.

The New York Times noted that the film covered how Hitler promised the Amin al-Husseini, the Grand Mufti of Jerusalem, that he would "remove the Jews from Palestine". The film described how a 2003 Syrian-made television series Ash-Shatat promoted antisemitic tropes. The narrator refuted the common claim that Israel's occupation of the Golan Heights and the West Bank after 1967 brought Arab leaders to call for Israel's destruction, noting that such calls were commonplace "even before the occupation".

== See also ==
- Anti-Zionism
- New antisemitism
- Antisemitism during the Gaza war
- Timeline of antisemitism in the 21st century
- Timeline of antisemitism in the 20th century
- Antisemitism in Islam
