= Andrew Goldberg (director) =

American producer and director (born 1968)

- Born: June 26, 1968 (age 58); Evanston, Illinois, U.S.
- Occupations: Director, producer
- Years active: 2000–present
- Website: www.somuchfilm.com

Andrew Goldberg (born June 26, 1968) is an American documentary director and producer, and the founder of So Much Film, a New York City production company. Since 2000 he has directed and produced long-form documentaries and news programming for PBS, ABC News, MSNBC, CBS News, Fox News, among others. Much of his documentary work covers historical and contemporary political, social, and cultural issues. His films also focus on various communities in the United States, including those of Jews, immigrants, Armenians, LGBTQ Americans, veterans, and others. Some of his films include The Armenian Genocide (2006), which was narrated by Julianna Margulies and aired nationally on PBS; the immigrant portrait The Iranian Americans (2012); Viral: Antisemitism in Four Mutations (2020); and White with Fear (2024), on race and American politics, which was nominated for Best Documentary Screenplay by the Writers Guild of America. He won an Emmy Award for his 2002 documentary A Yiddish World Remembered.

Goldberg's production company, So Much Film, has also produced unscripted television for HGTV, including the series Building Roots.

== Early life ==
Goldberg was born in Evanston, Illinois, and grew up in Chicago in a Jewish family. His mother, Phyllis Magida (1936–2016), was the author of several books and a restaurant critic and food columnist for the Chicago Tribune. His father, Arnold Goldberg (1929–2020), was a supervising psychoanalyst at the Institute for Psychoanalysis. and was also the Cynthia Oudejans Harris Professor of Psychiatry at Rush Medical School in Chicago.

Goldberg's mother named him after the civil rights worker Andrew Goodman, who was killed in Mississippi.

He received a Bachelor of Arts in history from Northwestern University and a Master of Business Administration in marketing from the University of Chicago.

== Career ==
=== Early films ===
A Yiddish World Remembered (2002) examines Jewish life in Eastern Europe before the Holocaust as recounted by surviving eyewitnesses. The film was hosted by the Oscar-nominated actor Elliott Gould and was commissioned, funded, and distributed by PBS. It won a New York Emmy Award for Outstanding Historical/Cultural Programming in 2003.

In 2004, Walter Cronkite hosted Goldberg's film Proud to Serve, which explores the life and culture of the U.S. Army through the personal stories of veterans. It premiered nationally on American Public Television.

=== The Armenian Genocide and antisemitism documentaries ===
Goldberg's 2006 film The Armenian Genocide examines the Armenian genocide during World War I. Broadcast nationally on PBS, it features interviews with Samantha Power and Peter Balakian, is narrated by Julianna Margulies, and includes historical narration by Ed Harris, Natalie Portman, Laura Linney, Jared Leto, and Orlando Bloom, among others.

Anti-Semitism in the 21st Century: The Resurgence aired on PBS in January 2007. Hosted by Judy Woodruff, the film surveys antisemitism in the Christian and Muslim worlds and traces its history in Europe up to the present day.

Goldberg's film Jerusalem: Center of the World aired nationally on PBS on April 1, 2009. Narrated by Ray Suarez, the two-hour film traces some 4,000 years of the city's history and its significance to the three major monotheistic religions.

Out in America (2011) profiles the lives of LGBT Americans across the country, from prominent figures to everyday citizens. It premiered nationally on PBS in June 2011.

The Iranian Americans (2012) chronicles the experiences of Iranians who emigrated to the United States following Ayatollah Khomeini's rise to power after the 1979 revolution. It premiered on PBS on December 18, 2012.

=== Viral: Antisemitism in Four Mutations ===
Viral: Antisemitism in Four Mutations received a limited theatrical release in February 2020 and made its television premiere on PBS on May 26, 2020. Written, produced, and directed by Goldberg and produced and edited by Diana Robinson, the film examines rising antisemitism through four country-specific segments set in the United States, Hungary, the United Kingdom, and France. Among its subjects are the 2018 Tree of Life synagogue shooting in Pittsburgh, anti-immigrant rhetoric directed at George Soros in Hungary, allegations of antisemitism in the British Labour Party under Jeremy Corbyn, and attacks against Jews in France. Interviewees include former U.S. president Bill Clinton, former British prime minister Tony Blair, the historian Deborah Lipstadt, and the journalists Fareed Zakaria and George Will; the film is narrated in part by Julianna Margulies.

=== White with Fear ===
White with Fear (2024) examines how some American conservative politicians, operatives, and media figures have used appeals to racial fear and white grievance as a political strategy over several decades. Written, produced, and directed by Goldberg, the film traces this strategy from Richard Nixon's 1968 "law and order" presidential campaign through later events including the September 11 attacks, subsequent presidential elections, and the January 6 United States Capitol attack. It features interviews with figures from across the political spectrum, including Hillary Clinton, Steve Bannon, former Fox News reporter Carl Cameron, The Lincoln Project co-founder Stuart Stevens, Representative Jamie Raskin, Rick Gates, and former Breitbart writer Katie McHugh. Goldberg has said the project grew out of debates about race in the United States that followed the murder of George Floyd in 2020.

The film premiered at the Chelsea Film Festival in New York in October 2024 and had limited theatrical runs in New York and Los Angeles before a video-on-demand release on June 3, 2025. It later aired as a PBS prime-time special on March 24, 2026. White with Fear was nominated for Best Documentary Screenplay at the 2026 Writers Guild of America Awards.

=== Other work ===
Beyond his documentary work, Goldberg has created and executive-produced unscripted television series. Through his company, So Much Film, he made the HGTV series Kitchen Cousins, Cousins on Call, and Building Roots (2022), and The Artisan's Kitchen for the Magnolia Network. He has also produced segments for CBS News Sunday Morning and National Public Radio, written and produced television commercials, and worked in live television.

== Recognition and awards ==
- New York Festivals World Medal, International TV Programming, 2000
- NETA Award for Historical Documentary, 2000
- CINE Golden Eagle for Outstanding Historical Programming, 2002
- New York Emmy Award for Outstanding Historical/Cultural Programming, 2003 (A Yiddish World Remembered)
- CINE Golden Eagle, 2004
- Writers Guild of America Award nomination, Best Documentary Screenplay, 2026 (White with Fear)

== Filmography ==
- The Armenian Americans (2000)
- The Armenians, A Story of Survival (2001)
- A Yiddish World Remembered (2002)
- Images of The Armenian Spirit (2003)
- They Came to America (2003)
- Proud to Serve: The Men and Women of the U.S. Army (2004)
- The Armenian Genocide (2006)
- Anti-Semitism in the 21st Century: The Resurgence (2007)
- The Jewish People: A Story of Survival (2008)
- Jerusalem: Center of the World (2009)
- Out in America (2011)
- The Iranian Americans (2012)
- The Jewish Journey: America (2015)
- Viral: Antisemitism in Four Mutations (2020)
- Armenia, My Home (2024)
- White with Fear (2024)
