= Olaf Blaschke =

German historian

Olaf Blaschke (born 29 December 1963) is a German historian. His research has focused on the modern and contemporary periods. Several (though not all) of his more substantial publications have involved the Roman Catholic church.

== Life ==
Blaschke was born in Bielefeld, a substantial manufacturing city located between Dortmund and Hanover. He undertook his first university level studies at Bielefeld University, concluding in 1991. During this period he achieved a Master of Arts degree and passed both levels of the national teaching qualification.

In 1996 he received his doctorate from Bielefeld for a work (subsequently published as a book) on Catholicism and Antisemitism in imperial Germany. After that he worked as a research assistant with Lutz Raphael at the University of Trier. Since 2005 Blaschke has been Project Leader in the Society Excellence Dependencies and Social Networks cluster. The project investigates the networks of Catholic churches and Catholicism researchers in the German Federal Republic. His habilitation (qualification) followed in 2006, based on a piece of work entitled "Publishers make History. Comparisons between Germany and Britain of the Book Market for Historical publications since 1945".

In 2007, and again from 2008 till 2012, Blaschke took over the teaching chair in Modern History at Trier, deputising for Andreas Gestrich. In 2012 he became teaching professor in modern and contemporary history at Heidelberg. Since the summer term of 2014 he has held a temporary professorship in nineteenth and twentieth century history, with particular focus on Historical Theory and Method, at the University of Münster.

Blaschke also has an academic presence outside Germany. During 2001/2002, supported by a Feodor Lynen Bursary from the Humboldt Foundation, he spent a year in Cambridge as a visiting scholar, during which time he held a visiting fellowship at St Catharine's College. The central location of the college, close to the old headquarters of the Cambridge University Press, was appropriate to the work he was undertaking – subsequently written up for his habilitation – on the changing relationship between publishers and academic authors between 1945 and 1980. Subsequently, in 2003, he became a stipendiate of the German Historical Institute London. This was followed in 2004/2005 with a year in southern Sweden as a guest professor at Lund University.

== Works ==
- Blaschke, Olaf (1997). Katholizismus und Antisemitismus im Deutschen Kaiserreich (in German). Göttingen: Vandenhoeck & Ruprecht. ISBN 3-525-35785-0. OCLC 38112891.
- Blaschke, Olaf (2010). Verleger machen Geschichte : Buchhandel und Historiker seit 1945 im deutsch-britischen Vergleich (in German). Göttingen: Wallstein. ISBN 978-3-8353-0757-5. OCLC 699856561.
- Blaschke, Olaf (2014). Die Kirchen und der Nationalsozialismus (in German). Stuttgart. ISBN 978-3-15-019211-5. OCLC 865721805.
- Berg, Matthias; Blaschke, Olaf; Sabrow, Martin; Thijs, Krijn; Thiel, Jens (2018). Die versammelte Zunft Historikerverband und Historikertage in Deutschland 1893–2000 Band 1 (in German). Göttingen. ISBN 978-3-8353-3294-2. OCLC 1055874271.
