= Avner Falk =

Israeli clinical psychologist and author

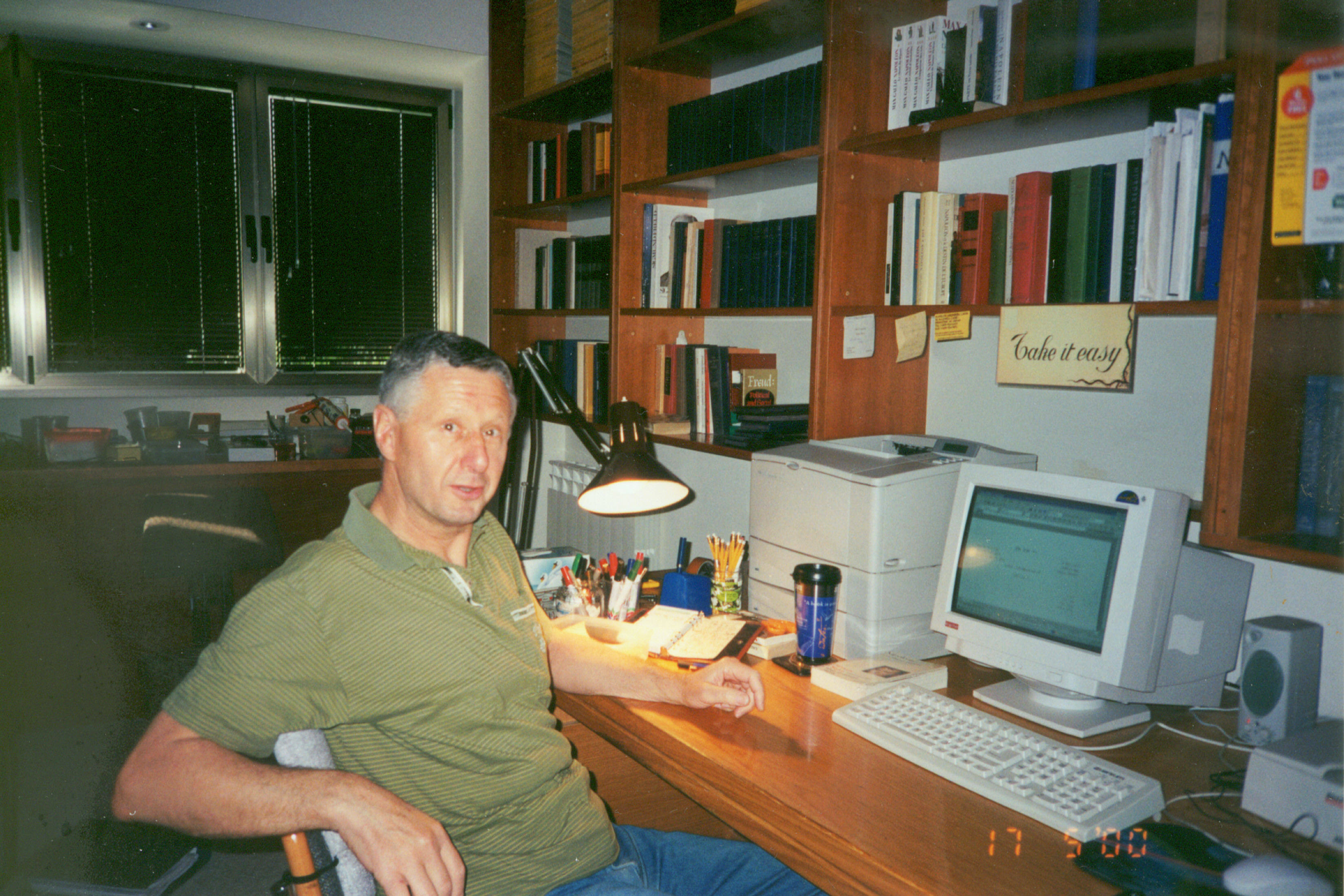

Avner Falk (Hebrew: אבנר פלק; born 1943) is an Israeli clinical psychologist and author. Falk has written psychoanalytic studies of Jewish and Israeli leaders, Jewish history, the Arab–Israeli conflict, antisemitism and Islamic terrorism.

== Biography ==
Avner Falk grew up in Tel Aviv and studied psychology and clinical psychology at the Hebrew University of Jerusalem (1960–1966) and at Washington University in St. Louis (1966–1970) where he received his Ph.D. in 1970. He returned to Israel in 1971 and worked as a clinical psychologist and psychotherapist in Jerusalem until 1995. He has published psychoanalytic biographies of Moshe Dayan, David Ben-Gurion, Theodor Herzl, Napoleon and Barack Obama. In 2005, his book Fratricide in the Holy Land: A Psychoanalytic View of the Arab-Israeli Conflict (2004) won the Outstanding Academic Title award from the American Library Association's Choice magazine.

In July 2010 Falk was contacted by Hans-Joachim Lang, a Holocaust historian and journalist in the German university town of Tübingen, whose city government had just published the existence in its museum of a wooden Torah disc from Zgierz, the hometown of Falk's maternal family, which had been in its possession since 1994. It turned out that the disc was a relic from a Torah scroll that Falk's Polish-Jewish maternal grandfather, Jozef Cwi Szpiro (1880–1941), had donated to his Zgierz synagogue in 1927 in memory of his deceased parents, and that some time after 1939 came into the possession of Otto Michel (1903–1993), a well-known Tübingen university theologian, a former Nazi and SA member, who after the Second World War and the Holocaust became a Jewish Studies pioneer in Tübingen, and whose widow had given it to the city museum. Since then, Falk has been writing a psychohistorical book, which has also become a detective story, about when and how this relic of his grandfather's Torah scroll came into Michel's possession. Michel himself had said nothing about his Nazi past in his autobiography of 1989 and had apparently told no one about how he had come by the wooden Torah disc. In November 2011 Falk received this relic of his grandfather's Torah scroll from the mayor of Tübingen, Boris Palmer (born 1971), in a public ceremony in Tübingen’s city hall, at which Falk delivered a German-language lecture on his findings entitled "Die Verneinung der Vergangenheit: Die Geschichte einer Thorarolle" ("The Denial of the Past: The Story of a Torah Scroll").

== Awards and critical acclaim ==
1987 Resident Scholar, Rockefeller Foundation Study and Conference Center, Bellagio, Italy

1997 Fellow of the International Napoleonic Society

1999 Featured Scholar, Clio's Psyche

2006 Outstanding Academic Title award for Fratricide in the Holy Land from the American Library Association's Choice magazine

== Published works ==
Books

1985 משה דיין: האיש והאגדה. ביוגרפיה פסיכואנליטית [Moshe Dayan, the Man and the Myth: a Psychoanalytic Biography]. Jerusalem: Cana. Tel Aviv: Maariv Library.

1987 דוד מלך ישראל: ביוגרפיה פסיכואנליטית של דוד בן-גוריון [David King of Israel: a Psychoanalytic Biography of David Ben-Gurion]. Tel Aviv: Tammuz Publishing.

1993 Herzl, King of the Jews: a Psychoanalytic Biography of Theodor Herzl. Lanham, Maryland: University Press of America

1996 A Psychoanalytic History of the Jews. Madison, New Jersey: Fairleigh Dickinson University Press. Cranbury, New Jersey & London: Associated University Presses

2004 Fratricide in the Holy Land: A Psychoanalytic View of the Arab-Israeli Conflict. Madison, Wisconsin: University of Wisconsin Press.

2007 Napoleon Against Himself: A Psychobiography. Charlottesville, Virginia: Pitchstone Publishing.

2008 Antisemitism: A History and Psychoanalysis of Contemporary Hatred. Westport, Connecticut: Praeger.

2008 Islamic Terror: Conscious and Unconscious Motives. Westport, Connecticut: Praeger.

2010 Franks and Saracens: Reality and Fantasy in the Crusades. London: Karnac Books

2010 The Riddle of Barack Obama: A Psychobiography. Westport, Connecticut: Praeger

2018 Agnon’s Story: A Psychoanalytic Biography of S. Y. Agnon, Leiden: Brill

2024 Franks and Saracens: A Psychoanalytic Study of the Crusades, Revised Edition, London: Routledge.
