= The Armenian Genocide (film) =

- Theatrical release poster
- Written by: Andrew Goldberg
- Directed by: Andrew Goldberg
- Country of origin: United States
- Original language: English

Production
- Producers: Andrew Goldberg; Oregon Public Broadcasting
- Running time: 60 minutes

Original release
- Network: PBS
- Release: April 17, 2006

The Armenian Genocide is a 2006 television documentary film exploring the Ottoman Empire killings of more than one million Armenians during World War I. The documentary was broadcast by most 348 PBS affiliate stations on April 17, 2006.

Because of the controversial nature of the subject in Turkey, PBS attempted to give both sides a voice and produced a four expert panel discussion to be aired immediately afterwards. However, due to an intense lobbying effort by Armenian groups and some members of Congress, the follow-up panel discussion was cancelled on a third of those stations broadcasting the documentary over concerns of offending human rights groups and the descendants of Armenian genocide survivors.

Produced in conjunction with Oregon Public Broadcasting, it was written and directed by Andrew Goldberg (who also directed The Armenians: A Story of Survival) and narrated by Hollywood celebrities Orlando Bloom, Ed Harris, Laura Linney, Jared Leto, Julianna Margulies, Paul Rudd and Natalie Portman.

== See also ==
- Armenian genocide in culture
- List of American films of 2006
