= Gauntlet (glove) =

Hand and wrist armour

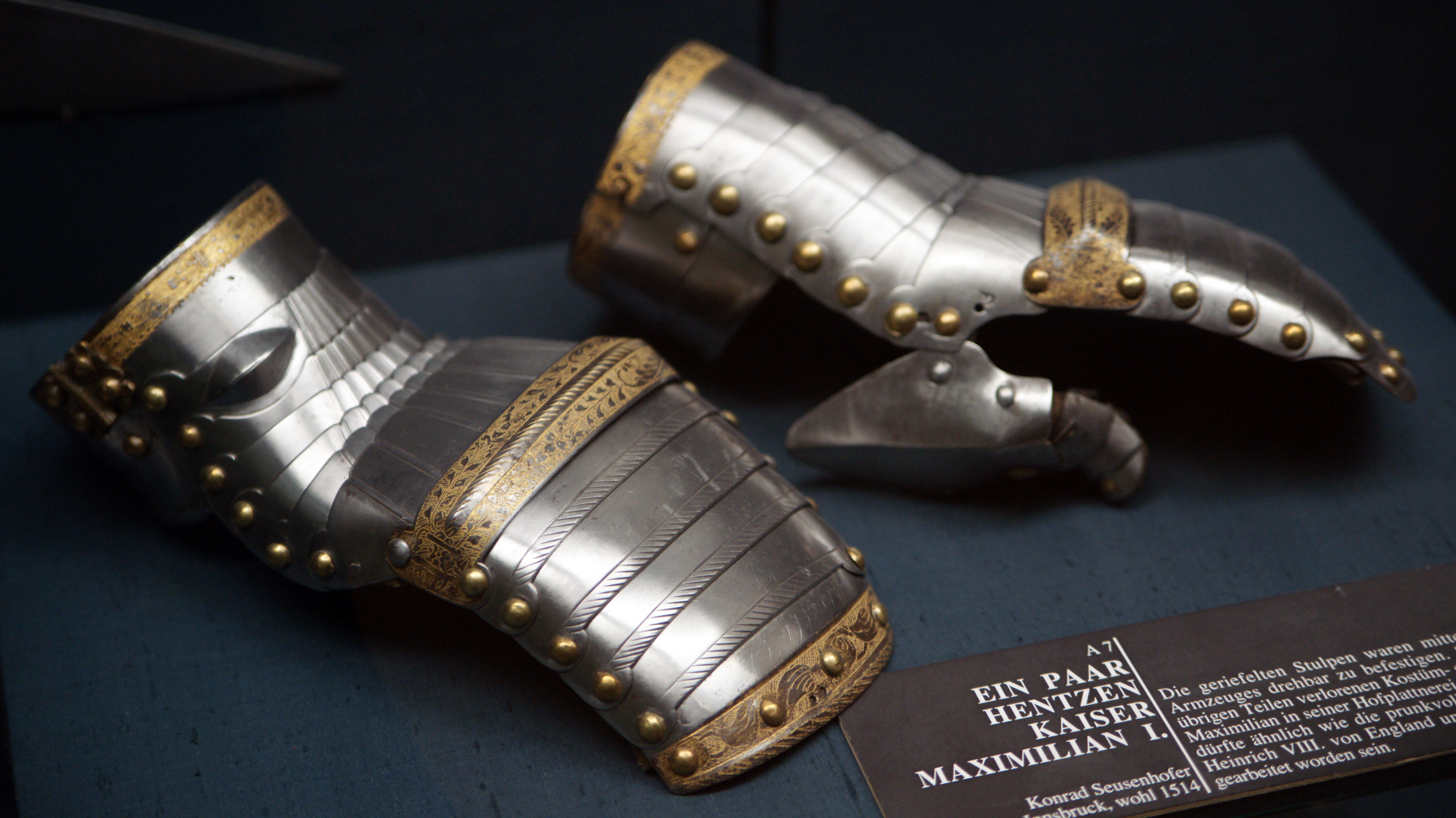
Almain rivet gauntlets of Emperor Maximilian I, c. 1514. Museum of Fine Arts (Kunsthistorisches Museum), Vienna

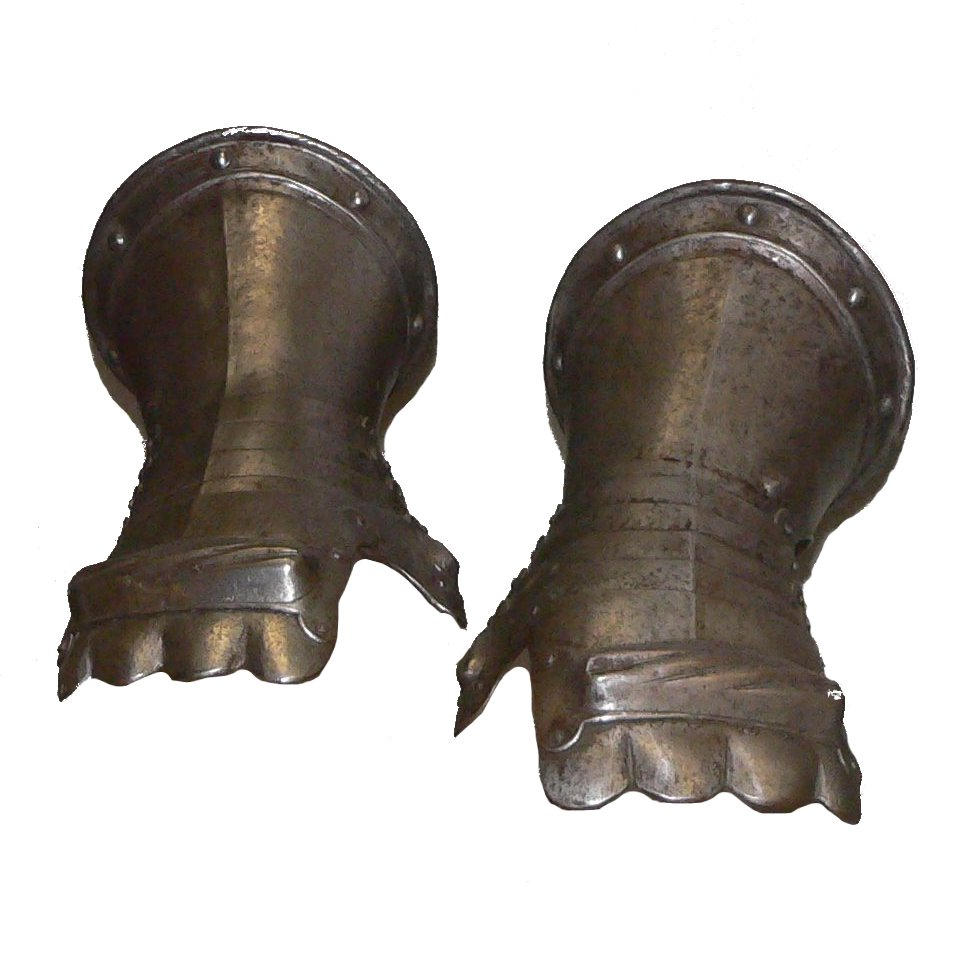
Pair of gauntlets, Germany, late 16th century

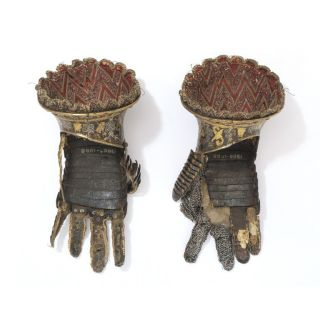
Gauntlets, about 1614. V&A Museum no. 1386&A-1888

A gauntlet (also spelled gantlet) is a type of glove that protects the hand and wrist of a combatant.

Gauntlets, which cover the hands, wrists, and sometimes forearms, are not to be confused with bracers, which cover the wrists and forearms but not the hands; bracers are common in medieval and fantasy cosplay.

== Types ==
=== Armour ===
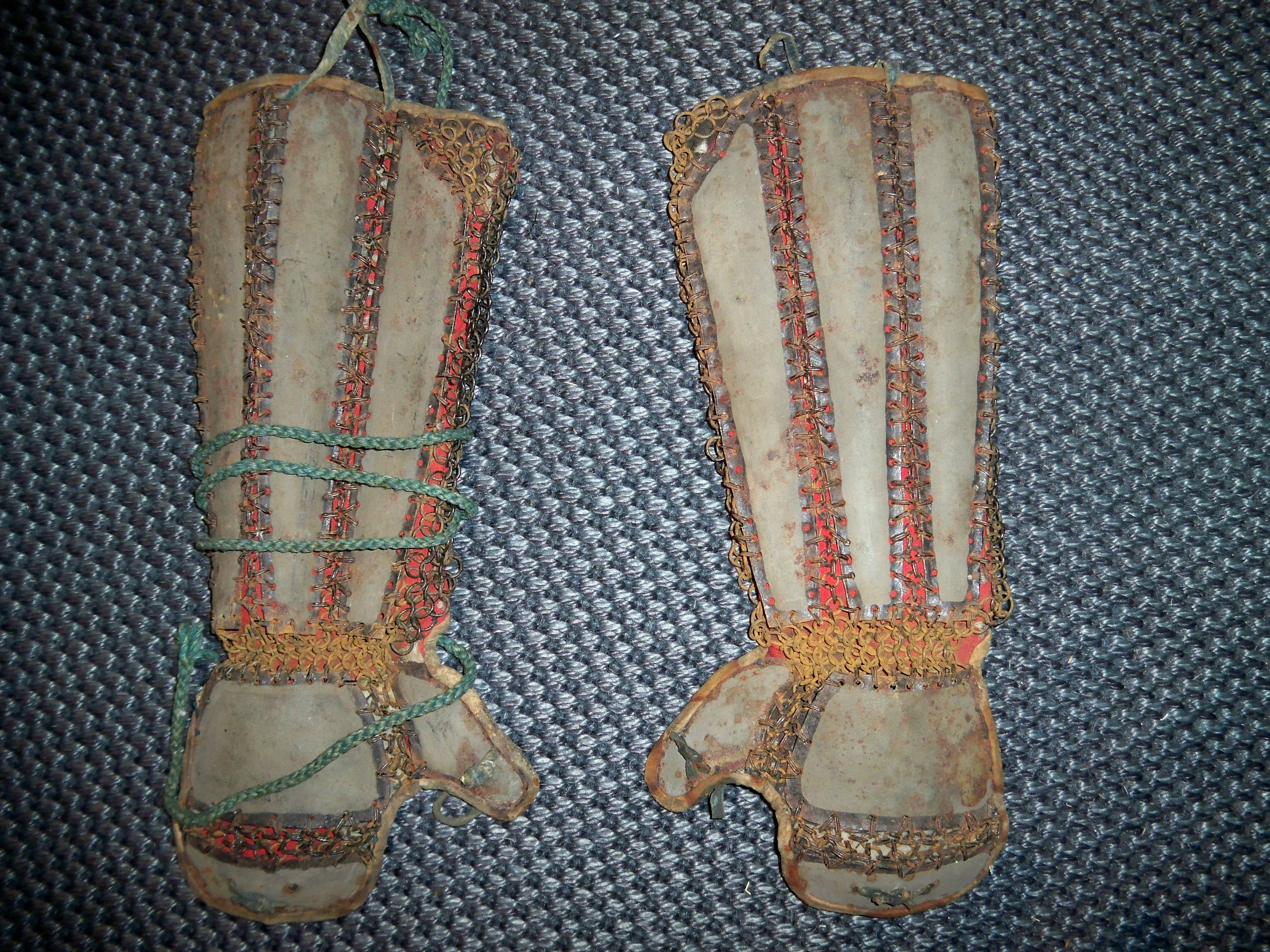
Japanese (samurai) Edo period gauntlets (han kote).

Beginning in the 11th century, European soldiers and knights relied on chain mail for protection of their bodies, and chain armor "shirts" with wide sleeves that hung to the elbow were common. However, it wasn't until the 12th century that chain mail shirts with longer, narrower sleeves began to be worn, and these on occasion had chain mail mittens or "muffs" resembling fingerless gloves and with a pocket for the thumb (though some of these did have complete fingers as well). These attached at the lower edge of the sleeve, and protected the wearer's hands from cuts and lacerations during combat but offered no protection against crushing blows. It wasn't until the early 14th century that armorers began to design fully articulated plate armor: along with this development of the use of plates as a means of protecting the body from blows was the development of hand protection in the form of gauntlets made of overlapping plates of steel. These were created both in the fingerless "mitten" style (which offered plate armor protection and allowed the fingers to share heat but limited the wearer's ability to move those fingers) as well as the fully fingered "glove" style (which though still ungainly and less comfortable in cold weather, permitted full use of all of the fingers).

A variety of gauntlet called a "demi-gauntlet" or "demi-gaunt" also came into use around this time. A demi-gaunt is a type of plate armour gauntlet that only protects the back of the hand and the wrist: demi-gaunts are worn with gloves made from chain mail or padded leather. The advantages of the demi-gaunt are that it allows better dexterity and is lighter than a full gauntlet, but the disadvantage is that the fingers are not as well protected.

In a 2021-2022 archeological excavation a well-preserved and nearly-intact 14th-century gauntlet was discovered near Switzerland's Kyburg Castle.

=== Contemporary protective gauntlets ===
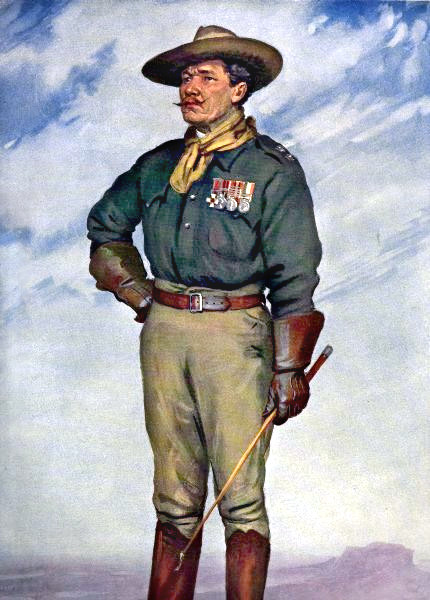
Daniel Patrick Driscoll DSO, member of the Legion of Frontiersmen, wearing brown leather gauntlets. Vanity Fair caricature 15 February 1911

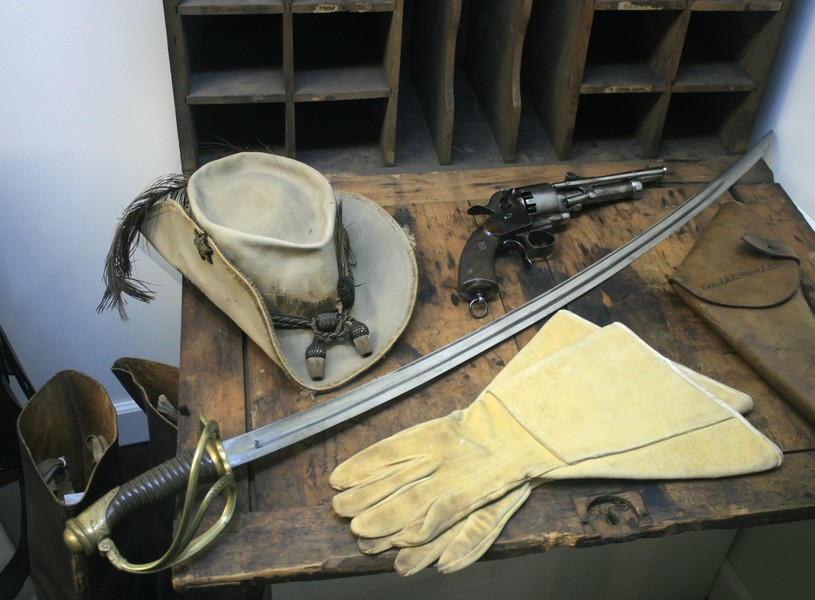
Hat, sword, LeMat Revolver and gauntlets of Major general J. E. B. Stuart (Museum of the Confederacy, in Richmond, Virginia)

Modern protective gloves called "gauntlets" continue to be worn by metal workers and welders when handling hot or molten metals or in contexts where sparks are common. These gauntlets no longer sport the metal plates of the originals, but instead are highly insulating against heat. Similar varieties of gauntlet are worn by automotive technicians to protect their hands when handling car components, and meat and fishery butchers often wear chain mail gauntlets to protect their hands from the sharp edges of knives. Motorcyclists wear gauntlets made of leather to protect their hands from abrasion during an accident, and snowmobile drivers wear fingerless gauntlets made of nylon to protect their hands from wind and cold temperatures while driving their vehicles. Falconers wear leather gauntlets to protect their hands from the sharp claws of the birds of prey that they handle, and lastly, modern competitors in fencing, particularly those competing with the épée, routinely wear fingered gauntlets to protect their hands from possible cuts and puncture wounds from their opponents' weapons.

=== As clothing ===
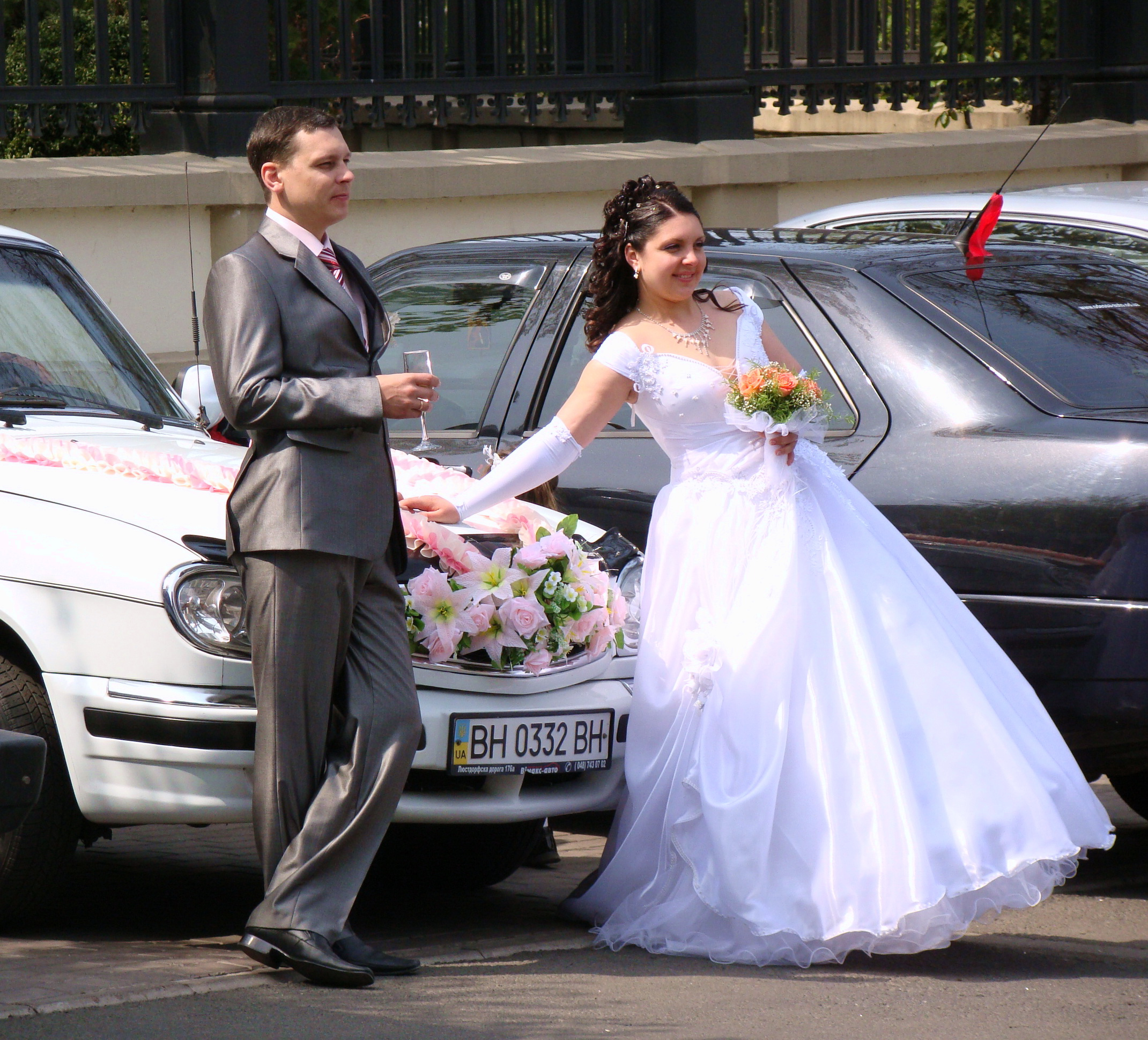
Bride wearing fingerless gauntlets, 2009

In Western women's fashion, a gauntlet can refer to an extended cuff with little or no hand covering. Such gauntlets are sometimes worn as elements of an evening gown or by brides at weddings.

=== Religious ===
In the Roman Catholic Church, the full-fingered gloves traditionally worn by the pope or other bishops are also known as gauntlets or episcopal gloves, though their use has largely been relaxed since Paul VI.

== "Throwing down the gauntlet" ==
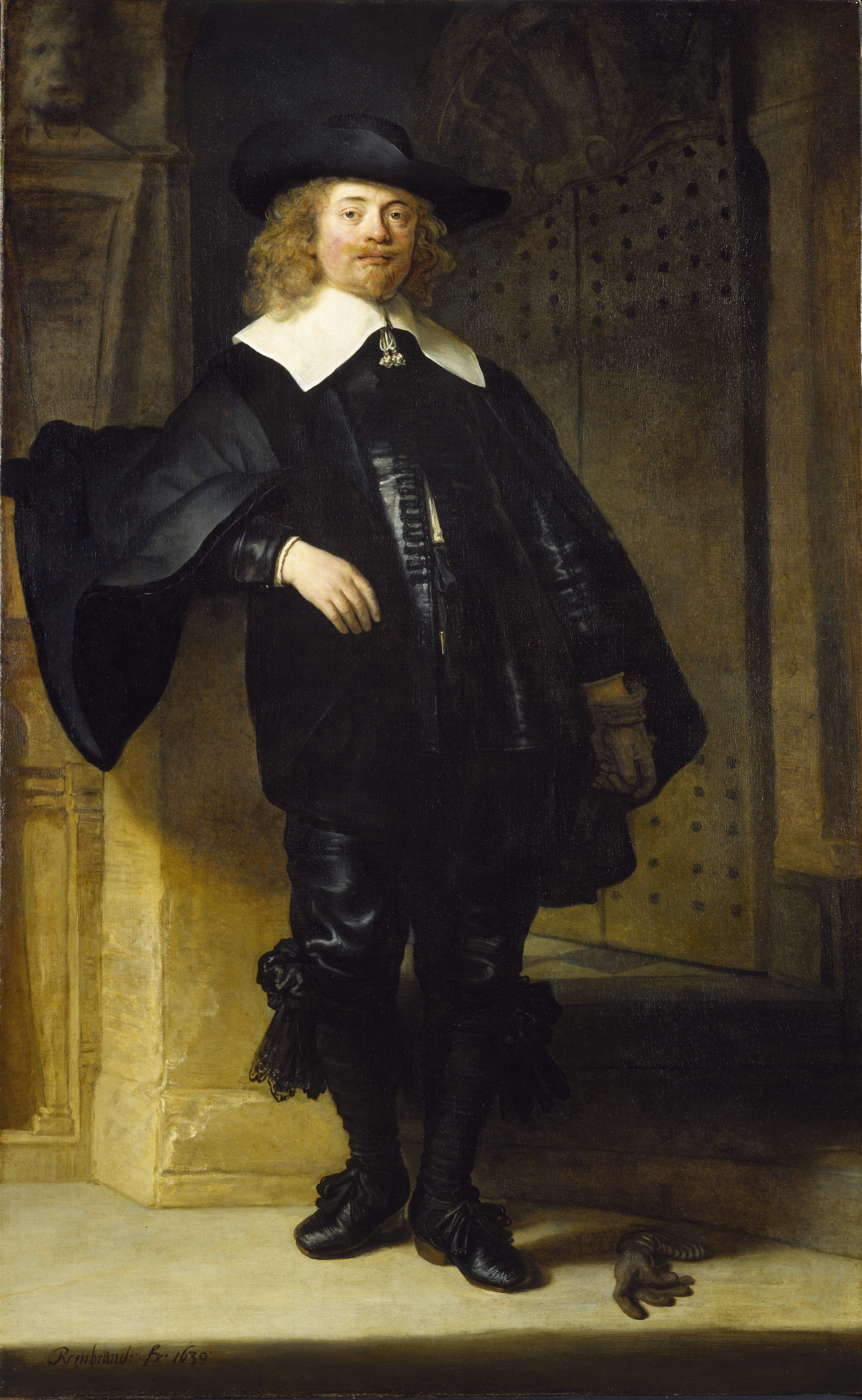
Portrait of Andries de Graeff (with a gauntlet in front of him), painting by Rembrandt in 1639

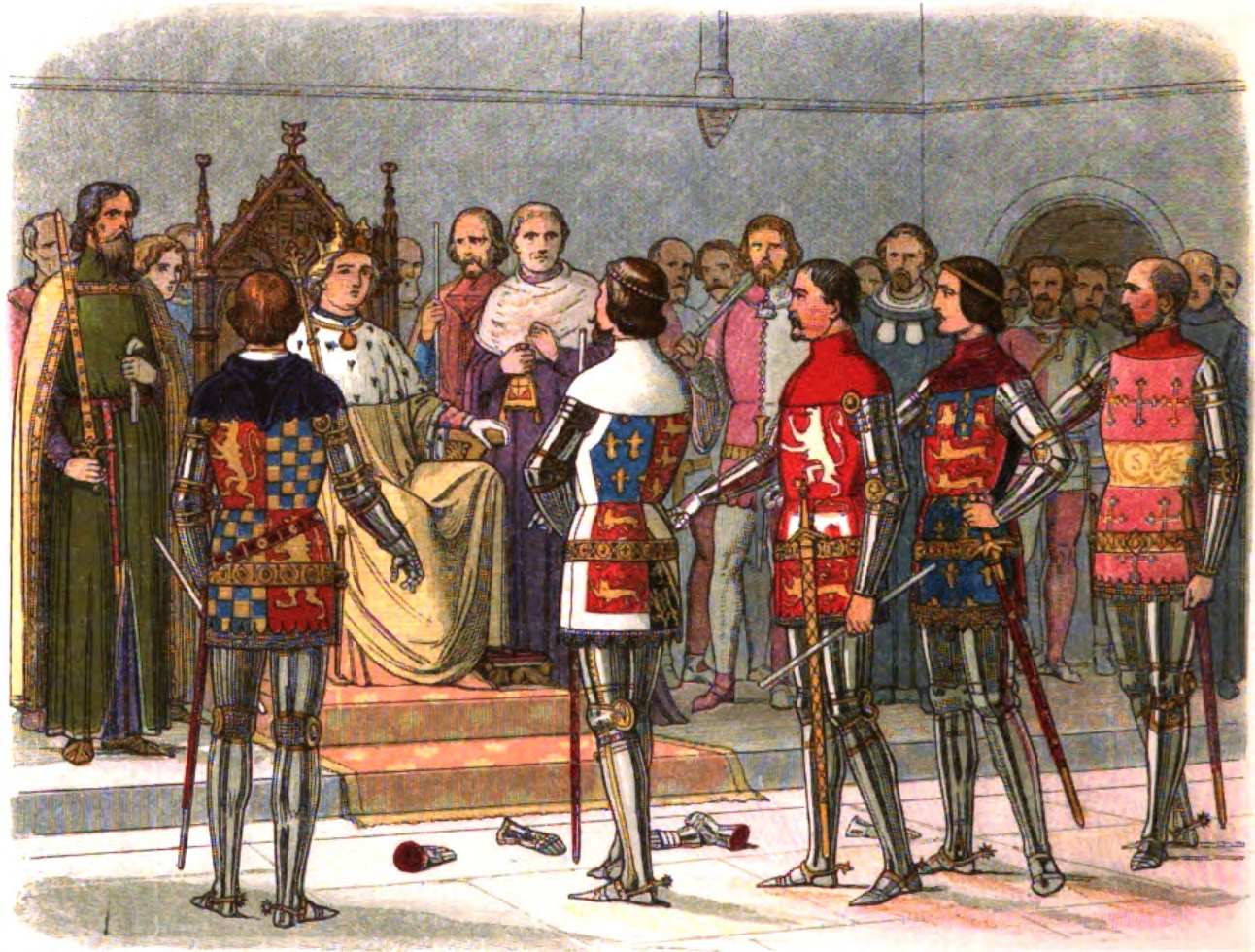
The Lords Appellant throw down their gauntlets and demand Richard II let them prove by arms the justice for their rebellion

The practice of throwing a gauntlet in response to a challenge has its origins in antiquity. In Book 5 of the Aeneid, Entelus responds to the challenge of the boxer Dares by throwing his caestus (boxing glove, or gauntlet) into the boxing ring.

To "throw down the gauntlet" is to issue a challenge. A gauntlet-wearing knight would challenge a fellow knight or enemy to a duel by throwing one of his gauntlets on the ground. The opponent would pick up the gauntlet to accept the challenge. The phrase is associated particularly with the action of the King's Champion, which officer's role was from medieval times to act as champion for the King at his coronation, in the unlikely event that someone challenged the new King's title to the throne.
