= Battle of Bukoba =

WWI Battle

- Part of the East African Campaign of World War I
Date	21–23 June 1915
Location	Bukoba, Lake Victoria, German East Africa 1°20′0″S 31°49′0″E
Result	British victory: British capture Bukoba

Belligerents
German Empire: German East Africa	British Empire

Commanders and leaders
(German Empire) Maj. Willibald von Stuemer (German Empire) Eberhard Gudowius	(United Kingdom of Great Britain and Ireland) Gen. Stewart (United Kingdom of Great Britain and Ireland) Col. Daniel Patrick Driscoll

Units involved
Schutztruppe: 7th Feldkompanie	British Army: Loyal North Lancashire Regiment; 25th Frontiersmen; 3rd KAR; 29th Punjabis

Strength
200+	1,500

Casualties and losses
14 killed 34 wounded	150 killed & wounded
- Location within Tanzania Battle of Bukoba (Africa)

The Battle of Bukoba was the first victory for Entente forces in German East Africa, coming after the disastrous battles of Tanga and Jassin. The British objective was the destruction of the Bukoba wireless station. Due to Bukoba's location on the shore of Lake Victoria, it was decided that the raid should take the form of an amphibious assault.

== Battle ==
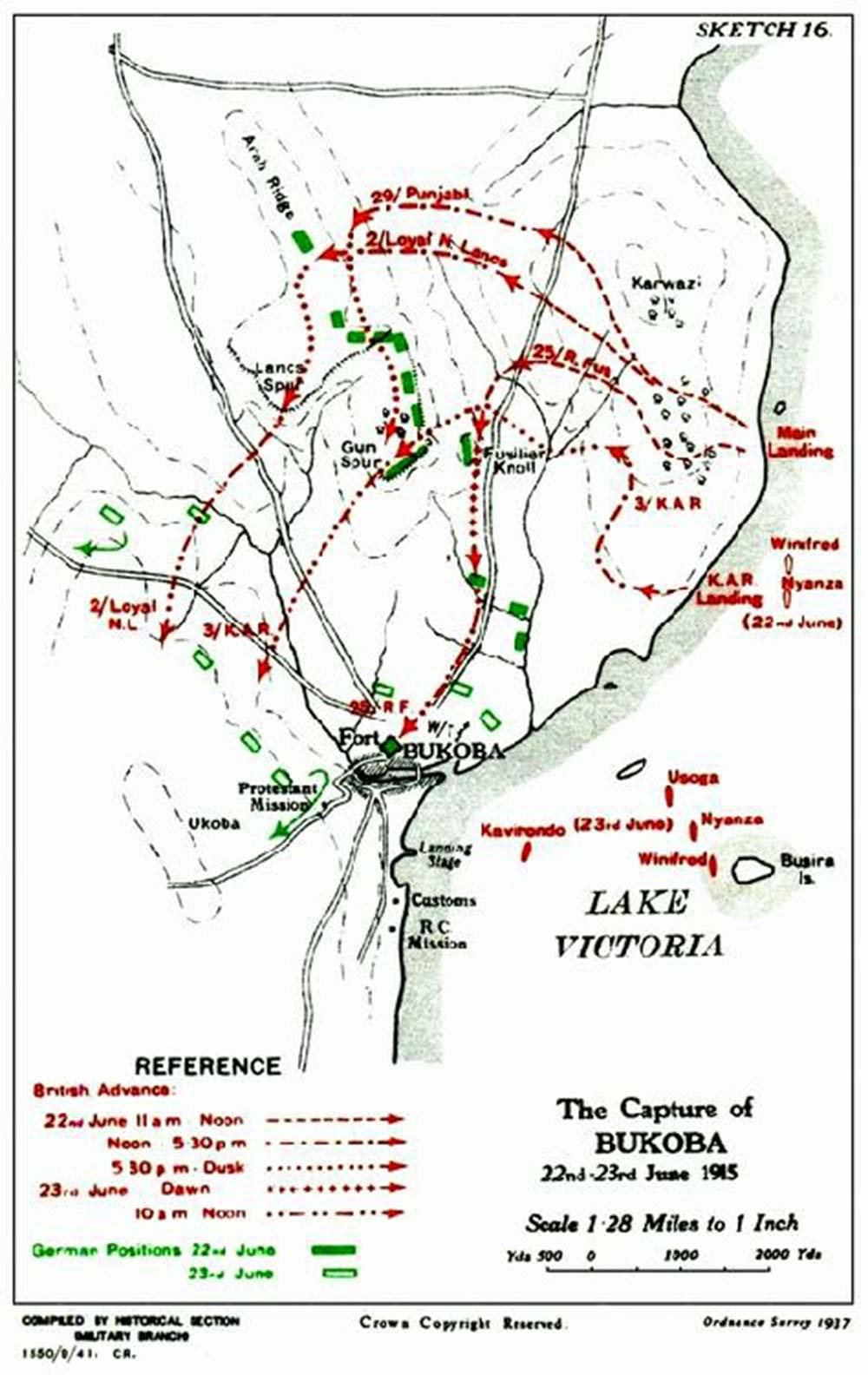
Map of the battle of Bukoba

The raid was launched from Kisumu in British East Africa on 21 June 1915. Amongst the units chosen for the attack were the Loyal North Lancashire Regiment and the 25th (Frontiersmen) Battalion, Royal Fusiliers, more commonly known by their nickname the 25th 'Frontiersmen'. This unusual unit had been created by Colonel Daniel Patrick Driscoll as an irregular skirmish force shaped by his experiences during the Second Boer War, and drawn largely from his peacetime paramilitary group, the Legion of Frontiersmen. A number of big game hunters were recruited to the force by Driscoll—most notably Frederick Selous, who was 64 when he joined and who died in action at the age of 65.

Upon reaching the objective at Bukoba the attackers were accidentally landed in a large swamp and were pinned down by fierce rifle and machine gun fire from the German positions under the command of Eberhard Gudowius. Finally managing to escape the swamp, the British force was then stalled by snipers. The attack continued for a further two days in the town; however, casualties were light on both sides. The Frontiersmen took the town on 23 June. An Australian member of the unit, Lieutenant Wilbur Dartnell, climbed to the top of the town hall and removed the German Imperial Ensign from the flagpole as a symbolic gesture of victory.

== Aftermath ==
The German fortress and wireless station in Bukoba had been destroyed during the battle. Additionally, British forces captured hundreds of German rifles and 32,000 rounds of ammunition. After the battle, the 25th Battalion sacked the deserted town, leading to them being nicknamed the "Boozaliers". During the sack, every house with ammunition found inside was burnt to the ground. Von Stuemer did not authorise his men to return to Bukoba until the following day, where they discovered that local Africans had also taken part in the sack and responded by summarily executing a chief named Ntale. The 25th Battalion was subsequently reassigned to border duties in British East Africa, which its members interpreted as punishment for their misbehaviour after the battle.

The aim of the raid, the destruction of the wireless station, was counterproductive for the British as it deprived them of the possibility of intercepting German transmissions. Bukoba was subsequently abandoned by British forces.

=== Wilbur Dartnell ===
After the battle, the 25th Battalion was ordered to guard the Uganda Railway between Nairobi and Mombasa, which was coming under heavy attack from German forces. During this period Wilbur Dartnell was posthumously awarded the Victoria Cross for an action which took place near Maktau on 3 September 1915.

The citation for Dartnell's VC

On 3 September 1915, near Maktau, Kenya, during a mounted infantry engagement, the enemy were so close that it was impossible to get the more severely wounded away. Lieutenant Dartnell, who was himself being carried away wounded in the leg, seeing the situation, and knowing that the enemy's black troops murdered the wounded, insisted on being left behind, in the hope of being able to save the lives of other wounded men. He gave his own life in a gallant attempt to save others.
