= Wilbur Dartnell =

Soldier, Victoria Cross recipient

Wilbur Dartnell VC
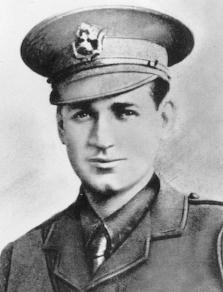
- Lieutenant Wilbur Dartnell in 1915
- Born: William Thomas Dartnell; 6 April 1885; Collingwood, Australia
- Died: 3 September 1915 (aged 30); Maktau, British East Africa
- Burial place: Commonwealth War Grave Cemetery, Voi
- Spouse: Elizabeth Edith Smyth (m. 1907)
- Military career
- Allegiance: Australia; United Kingdom
- Branch: Australian Army; British Army
- Service years: 1900–1902; 1906; 1915
- Rank: Lieutenant
- Units: Victorian Mounted Rifles (1900–1902); 25th (Frontiersmen) Battalion, Royal Fusiliers (1915)
- Conflicts: Second Boer War; Bambatha Rebellion; First World War; East African Campaign; Battle of Bukoba
- Awards: Victoria Cross; Mentioned in Despatches

William Thomas Dartnell, VC (6 April 1885 – 3 September 1915), also known as Wilbur Taylor Dartnell, was an Australian-born soldier, actor and a recipient of the Victoria Cross, the highest award for gallantry in the face of the enemy that can be awarded to British and Commonwealth forces. Born in Melbourne, he served in the Second Boer War as a teenager and later in the Bambatha Rebellion of 1906. He married, managed his own business and worked as a professional actor before immigrating to South Africa in 1912 or 1913.

Dartnell offered his services to the British Army on the outbreak of the First World War, and was commissioned into the 25th (Frontiersmen) Battalion, Royal Fusiliers in February 1915. He fought in the East African Campaign and was mentioned in despatches for the Battle of Bukoba, where he had stormed the German-held town hall, pulled down the German flag and replaced it with the Union Jack. On 3 September 1915, after his company had been ambushed and despite being wounded, Dartnell voluntarily stayed behind in an attempt to save the lives of wounded men as the remainder of the British force retired from the scene. Dartnell was killed in the attempt, but in recognition of his determination and sacrifice he was posthumously awarded the Victoria Cross.

== Early life ==
William Thomas Dartnell was born in the Melbourne suburb of Collingwood on 6 April 1885 to Henry Dartnell, an English-born fruiterer, and his Australian wife Rose Ann (née Hanley). (Note: There is a slight discrepancy between sources regarding Dartnell's place of birth. Several place it at Collingwood, while others record the neighbouring suburb of Fitzroy. This article uses Collingwood as it is the location noted in Dartnell's Australian Dictionary of Biography entry.) He was brought up in Melbourne and, after leaving school, became an actor. In 1900, at the age of 15, Dartnell joined the Victorian Mounted Rifles, a part-time colonial militia unit. The regiment was mobilised as the 5th Victorian (Mounted Rifles) Contingent in early 1901 for service in the Second Boer War, and embarked for South Africa on 15 February. Arriving in Port Elizabeth the following month, Dartnell saw service in the Cape Colony and Orange Free State over the next twelve months and was wounded on 6 April—his 16th birthday. The Mounted Rifles returned to Australia in March 1902, and Dartnell was demobilised soon thereafter. He later returned to South Africa, and served as part of Royston's Horse during the Bambatha Rebellion in Natal in 1906. For his service in these two campaigns Dartnell was issued the Queen's South Africa Medal with "Cape Colony" and "Orange Free State" clasps, the King's South Africa Medal with the clasps "South Africa 1901" and "South Africa 1902", and the Natal Native Rebellion Medal with "1906" clasp.

After he returned to Australia, Dartnell married Elizabeth Edith Smyth on 15 April 1907 at Holt's Matrimonial Agency on Queen Street, Melbourne. They settled in Fitzroy, and had a daughter in 1908. Little is known about Dartnell's life over the next few years, though it is thought that he managed his own business and worked as an actor until 1912 or 1913, when he again departed for South Africa. Elizabeth and their daughter remained in Victoria, while Dartnell established himself in East London, a coastal city in the Cape Province. He found employment with the Standard Printing Company, and was a regular contributor to their Saturday newspaper, the Weekly Standard. During this period, he started using the name Wilbur Taylor Dartnell and, according to historian Gerald Gliddon, became engaged to another woman, a Mabel Evans.

== First World War ==
After the outbreak of the First World War, Dartnell organised and chaired a meeting of Australians in East London who were willing to serve the British Empire. He cabled the War Office with a list of interested names (including his own), offered their services and requested passage to England in order to enlist. The request was evidently approved, as the group embarked for Britain in late September 1914. Using his assumed name, Dartnell joined the Legion of Frontiersmen and was subsequently commissioned as a temporary second lieutenant in the 25th (Frontiersmen) Battalion, Royal Fusiliers on 12 February 1915. As the "Frontiersmen" designation may suggest, the 25th Battalion "included men of various ages and with strange experience from all quarters of the globe", according to the regimental history. The battalion had been specifically raised to operate from British East Africa against Germany's neighbouring colonial possessions, and was reputedly the only British unit "sent on active service during the war without preliminary training". The 25th embarked from Plymouth for Mombasa on 10 April, less than two months after it had been raised. Dartnell had spent the intervening time stationed in Swaythling, and had made a number of trips to Belgium ferrying drafts of artillery horses to the Western Front.

The 25th Battalion arrived in Mombasa on 4 May, and was immediately dispatched to Kajiado to defend the local section of the Uganda Railway from German raiding parties. Being a strategic rail line, it had been subject to frequent guerrilla-style attacks since the declaration of war. In June, Dartnell took part in the attack on the German fort and wireless station at Bukoba; the base for German raids on the Ugandan frontier. The assault party, numbering approximately 400, had had to sail across Lake Victoria and scale a "cliff-like incline" before they reached the outskirts of Bukoba to commence their attack on 21 June. The British and German forces wrested for control of the town for two days before the raiding party was able to seize the wireless station and town hall. In the final assault, Dartnell had been the first to enter the German-held town hall, and had hauled down the German flag to replace it with the Union Jack. Dartnell's actions were later recognised with a mention in despatches. He was also reportedly recommended for the Distinguished Service Order for his performance in the battle, but this was not awarded. He was, however, promoted to temporary lieutenant on 25 July.

=== Victoria Cross ===
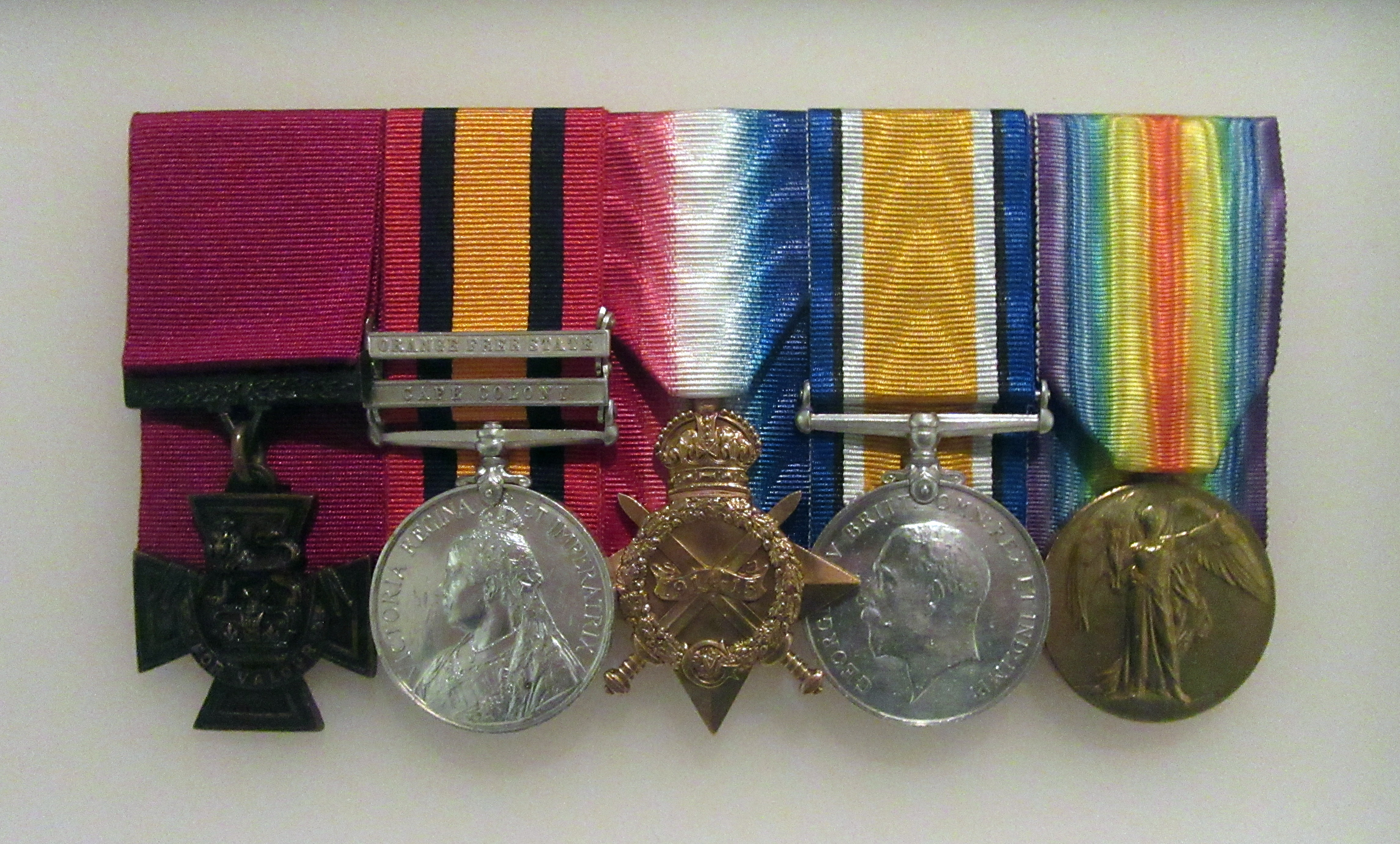
Dartnell's medals on display at the Australian War Memorial, Canberra

Shortly after the victory at Bukoba, the 25th Battalion moved to Voi where a military railway was being constructed for an allied advance into German East Africa. The battalion was employed in protection duties during this time, while two mounted infantry companies were formed in August by drawing upon the unit and the 2nd Battalion, Loyal North Lancashire Regiment to patrol the frontier around Maktau, 40 kilometres (25 mi) to Voi's east. Dartnell was assigned the command of a section within one of the companies.

On 3 September, word came through that a German raiding party was in the vicinity of Maktau. A counter force of 117 men was raised from Dartnell's company with Captain John Woodruffe in command, and sent to intercept the German troops. The British force, however, was ambushed by a German party approximately 200 strong, which included a number of native Askari soldiers. Casualties were high, and the situation soon descended into chaos. Woodruffe, by this time badly wounded and concerned that his men were becoming surrounded, ordered that the wounded be quickly withdrawn so that the remainder of the force could retire. However, given the intensity of the firefight and the limited resources available, the grievously wounded could not be moved. Dartnell had been wounded in the leg and was being carried away to safety when he realised the situation. Fearing what the Askari would do to the British wounded, he demanded to remain and fight. Though twice instructed to leave, Dartnell refused and gave the order for his men to abandon him. Dartnell was last seen firing on the German troops, who were within 25 metres (27 yd) of his position. When his body was recovered several hours later, it was surrounded by seven dead German soldiers.

== Legacy ==
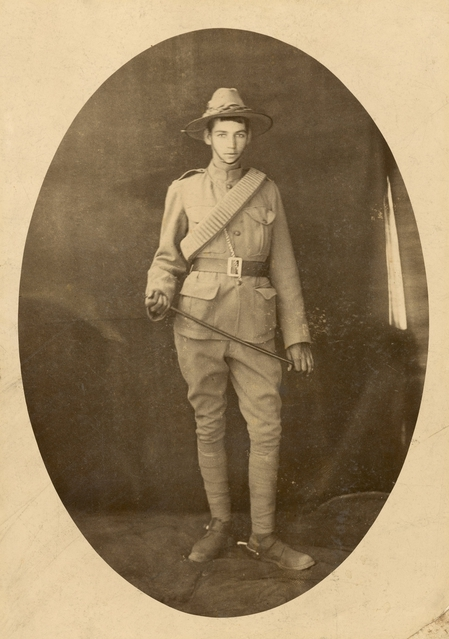
William Dartnell, a teenage private in the Victorian Mounted Rifles, in 1900

Dartnell's determination and sacrifice during his last battle was posthumously recognised with the award of the Victoria Cross (VC). (Note: Dartnell was also posthumously issued the 1914–15 Star, British War Medal, and Victory Medal for his service in the First World War.) The announcement and accompanying citation for the medal was published in a supplement to the London Gazette on 23 December 1915, reading:

War Office, 23rd December 1915.

His Majesty the KING has been graciously pleased to award the Victoria Cross to the undermentioned Officers: —

Temporary Lieutenant Wilbur Dartnell, late 25th (Service) Battalion (Frontiersmen), The Royal Fusiliers (City of London Regiment).

For most conspicuous bravery near Maktau (East Africa) on 3rd September, 1915.

During a mounted infantry engagement the enemy got within a few yards of our men, and it was found impossible to get the more severely wounded away. Lieutenant Dartnell, who was himself being carried away wounded in the leg, seeing the situation, and knowing that the enemy's black troops murdered the wounded, insisted on being left behind in the hopes of being able to save the lives of the other wounded men.

He gave his own life in the gallant attempt to save others.

Dartnell was one of four personnel to receive the VC in the East African Campaign. (Note: The other three were John Butler, William Bloomfield and Frederick Booth.) He and seven of the other British troops killed in the ambush were initially buried at Maktau Military Cemetery, but were later reinterred in the Commonwealth War Grave Cemetery at Voi. His military effects were sold off in October and the proceeds sent to his fiancée Mabel, whom Dartnell had named in his will but the funds were later claimed by his widow. Elizabeth Dartnell received her husband's VC from Sir Ronald Munro Ferguson, the Governor-General of Australia, in a private ceremony at Government House, Melbourne on 7 October 1916. Sir Arthur Stanley, the Governor of Victoria, and Sir Edmund Barton, a justice of the High Court and a former Prime Minister of Australia, were also in attendance. Elizabeth, who was living with her daughter in the Melbourne suburb of Murrumbeena at the time, later named her house "Maktau" after the place of her husband's actions and death, and was later invited to the VC centenary celebrations in London in 1956.

Dartnell's status as a professional actor was not forgotten. Several newspaper reports after his death postulated whether his VC was the first awarded to an actor, and he is commemorated on a plaque in the Theatre Royal, Drury Lane. Dartnell Street in Canberra is also named for him, while the German flag he captured at Bukoba is in the collection of the Royal Fusiliers headquarters in London. In 1981 Dartnell's VC and other medals were sold at a Sotheby's auction to Spink & Son for A$24,000. The auction house held the medals for little more than two years before auctioning them off again in 1983 for A$36,000. The buyer donated the set to the Australian War Memorial, where they are displayed in the Hall of Valour.

== Notes ==
Footnotes

Citations
