= Zurich massacre =

1349 antisemitic massacre in Switzerland

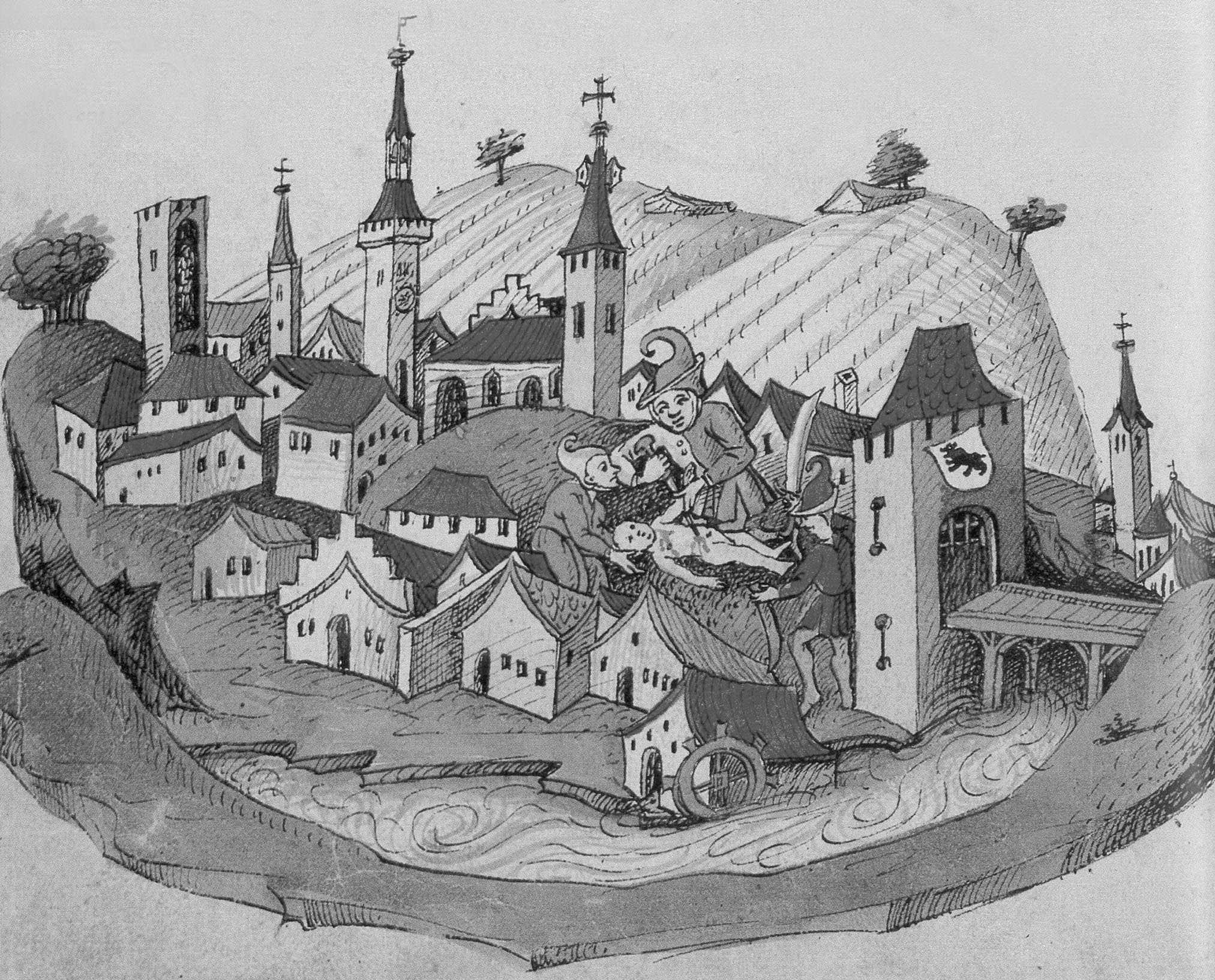
- Jews allegedly killing a Christian child, from Benedikt Tschachtlan’s Berner Chronik (1470)
- Date: February 21, 1349
- Location: Zurich, Switzerland; 47°22′28″N 08°32′28″E
- Cause: Antisemitism (Alleged murder of Zur Wyden's son; alleged well poisoning)
- Casualties: about 60 (?)

The Zurich massacre was an antisemitic episode in Zurich, Switzerland, which occurred in 1349. The incident was caused by antisemitism in the city due to the alleged murder of the son of a Zurich man, and fueled by the subsequent accusations of well poisoning. This event took place in the frame of the widespread persecution of Jews during the Black Death, in which the Jews were accused of spreading the bubonic plague (known as Black Death).

== Background ==
The persecution of the Jews in Zurich seems to be connected with the disappearance of a young boy. The son of Zurich man Zur Wyden from a family of shoemakers, about four years old, was murdered, and the Jews were accused of the murder. He was buried by his murderers in the Wolfbach brook. A boy named Walther von Wyl treading the water on stilts found the dead body some time later. The Jews supposedly killed him with nails, as he was "pushed [hammered] to death" (zu tod gestumpft). They had taken his blood and then had buried him in the stream.

The accused Jews were brought to court. Those declared guilty were burned to death, while their supposed accomplices were banished from Zurich.

Because of lack of contemporary chronicles reporting the story of the murder of the child (which is first mentioned in written sources roughly two hundred years after the event) some modern historians doubt its veracity.

== The Massacre ==
Shortly after the Zur Wyden's case was over, the Zurich Jews were accused of well poisoning. As a result, the city council ordered the Jews to be burned to death. They were executed on a religious holiday, on Saturday, 21 February 1349. The Jews were locked inside a house, which was then set on fire.

From the birth of God 1349 [years] the Jews of Zurich were burned on St. Matthias's eve (Do von Gots geburt 1349 do brand man die Juden Zúrich an sant. Mathis abend)

Apparently, some Jews fled to the nearby Kyburg Castle. They hoped to find protection here, but were nonetheless killed in the Kyburg massacre, in which 330 Jews were burned in the fortress. The Zurich Jewish community numbered around 400, and most of them were killed. The property of the Jews was then stolen. Mayor Rudolf Brun for example took possession of the house of a certain Moses. The surviving Jewish women and children were allowed to keep property; however, any surviving Jew was banished. Meanwhile, all debts owed to the Jews were voided. The value of property stolen from the Jews in Zurich is thought to have been significant.

== Date of the event ==
The best source dates the event on evening of 23 February 1349 without giving further details. One source reports that the Jewish community of the city had been locked up in a house to be killed by burning them. Another source dates the event on 21 February.

== Aftermath ==
In spite of the 1349 massacre, the Jews came back to Zurich as early as 1352. Thereupon expulsion orders were issued in 1425, 1435, 1436. The multiple number of these edicts may indicate they weren't strictly observed. However, in 1624 the Jews were finally completely expelled, after the execution of Eiron (Aaron) of Lengnau, who had been accused of blasphemy.

== See also ==
- History of the Jews in Switzerland
- List of massacres in Switzerland
- Martyrdom in Judaism
