= John Shiwak =

Newfoundland Regiment soldier

John Shiwak (1889 – November 21, 1917) was a Newfoundland sniper during the First World War. He was a member of the Newfoundland Regiment and noted as one of the best snipers in the British forces during the war.

Shiwak, an Inuk, lived at Cul-de-Sac, a small community near his birthplace of Rigolet, at the entrance to Lake Melville. According to family lore, the family name was changed from Sikoak, an Inuit word meaning newly formed ice, by Harry Paddon of the Grenfell Mission to Shiwak. He was a hunter in the far interior of Labrador and also of the Labrador Sea near his hometown, where he learned to handle a rifle.

Shiwak had joined the Legion of Frontiersmen, a paramilitary organization that had been founded in Great Britain in 1905 and had set up operations in Newfoundland in 1911. In 1915 Shiwak left Rigolet for St. John's and enlisted in the Newfoundland Regiment on July 24. During his time in the war his superiors recognised his abilities as a sharp shooter and, on April 16, 1917, he was promoted to Lance Corporal. On November 21, 1917, he and six fellow soldiers were killed by a shell at Masnières.

Capt R.H. Tait provided the following details about John Shiwak's death in a letter written on February 12, 1918 : "I was present on the morning of Nov. 21st when the above NCO was killed. We had taken part of the village (Masnières) in the attack on the 20th, and remained in our consolidated positions on that night. The next day we were ordered to take up a position on the other end of the village and act as counter attacking battalion if required. We assembled in the Sucrerie and, having formed up, proceeded along the canal bank toward another sugar factory where Batt’n HQ was to be located. The enemy at the time were shelling the bank and one shell burst right in the middle of our column and killed seven, amongst whom was L/C Shiwak, and wounded about ten others. Shiwak was buried that afternoon in the village of Masnières and close to the spot where he fell. His loss was keenly felt by the whole Regiment as he was a great favourite with all ranks, an excellent scout and observer, and a thoroughly good and reliable fellow in every way. Shiwak will long be remembered by all who knew him."

In 2014, a new residential wing at Memorial University of Newfoundland was named Shiwak Hall in his honour.

On June 30, 2023, a commemorative plaque honoring Shiwak was unveiled in Masnières, France.

== See also ==
- List of people of Newfoundland and Labrador
- List of communities in Newfoundland and Labrador
