= 210th Battalion (Frontiersmen), CEF =

The 210th (Frontiersmen) Battalion, CEF was a unit in the Canadian Expeditionary Force during the First World War. Based in Moose Jaw, Saskatchewan, the unit was raised by the local Legion of Frontiersmen in early 1916 in that city and surrounding district. After sailing to England in April 1917, the battalion was absorbed into the 19th Reserve Battalion on April 22, 1917. The 210th (Frontiersmen) Battalion, CEF had one Commanding Officer: Lieut-Col. W. E. Seaborn. The Battalion was awarded the Battle Honour "Honour of the Great War".
