= Kryburg gauntlet =

Archeological discovery in Switzerland

The Kyburg gauntlet is a medieval iron glove discovered near Switzerland's Kyburg Castle during a 2021-2022 archeological excavation.

== Discovery ==
Demolition work was planned near Kyburg Castle, about 20 miles north of Zurich; the castle was near a medieval town and the planned work threatened any artifacts that might be present on the site. Excavation to preserve any artifacts present was carried out in late 2021 and early 2022. One of the major finds was the gauntlet.

A medieval-era weaving cellar and multiple other artifacts, including over 50 iron pieces, were also found during the excavation. The gauntlet was found within the remains of the weaving cellar, leading archeologists to believe a blacksmith was working in the area before a fire destroyed the weaving cellar.

== Description ==
The right hand gauntlet was almost complete. Portions of a left hand gauntlet were also recovered. The gauntlet has four finger-folds. Side rivets allowed the gauntlet to be a flexible glove. It is made of iron and was likely attached to an interior textile or leather glove.

Because the gauntlet shows evidence of creation by a skilled craftsman, and such armor was expensive, the gauntlet probably belonged to a member of the nobility or another person of high status.

== Importance ==
According to Zurich Cantonal Archaeology, most other gauntlets recovered have been from later periods; only five others from this period are known to exist from Swiss excavations, and all are fragmentary.

== Exhibition ==
Kyburg Castle planned a permanent display of a copy of the gauntlet and a reconstruction of what it would have looked like when it was made starting in late March of 2024 and a three-week display of the original starting in September of 2024.
