= Francis Morphet Twisleton =

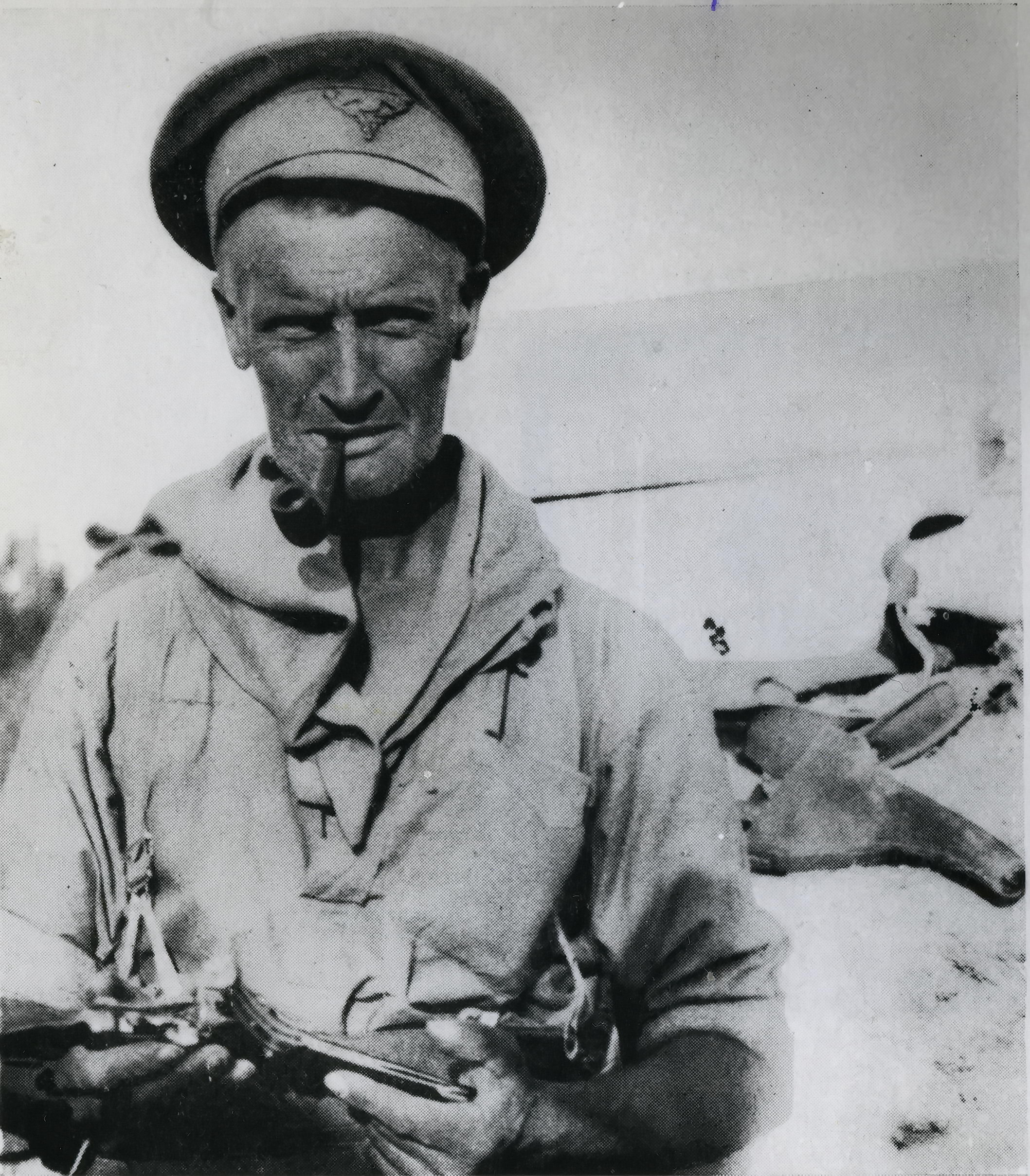
- Twisleton at Gallipoli, August 1915
- Born: 17 February 1873; Settle, Yorkshire, England
- Died: 15 November 1917 (aged 44) (DOW); Ayun Kara, Palestine
- Military career
- Allegiance: New Zealand
- Branch: New Zealand Military Forces
- Rank: Major
- Conflicts: Second Boer War; First World War; Gallipoli Campaign; Western Front; Sinai and Palestine campaign
- Awards: Military Cross
- Other work: Farmer, author

Francis Morphet Twisleton (17 February 1873 – 15 November 1917) was a New Zealand soldier who served in the Boer War and the First World War and became well known for his writings of soldiering life.

Born in England, he and his brother emigrated to New Zealand in 1895 and worked as farm labourers. In 1900, he joined the New Zealand military to serve in South Africa during the Boer War. He wrote extensively of life as a soldier and many of his letters were published in newspapers. After his service ended, he began farming and also was active in the Legion of Frontiersmen, eventually becoming its New Zealand commandant. During the First World War, he served at Gallipoli, on the Western Front, and in Palestine. He died of wounds received in an action in Palestine.

== Early life ==
Francis Morphet Twisleton, known as Frank, was born on 17 February 1873, in Settle, Yorkshire, England to a farmer and his wife. After completing his education, he went farming in Yorkshire. In 1895, he emigrated to New Zealand with his brother Thomas and worked his way around the country as a farm labourer.

== Boer War ==
In January 1900, he joined the Second New Zealand Contingent, which was being raised for service in the Boer War. He arrived in South Africa the following month. Thomas followed him to South Africa as part of the Fourth New Zealand Contingent but was killed in action in 1901. Frank served as a mounted soldier in the country until May 1901. He wrote home regularly and his letters were published in a number of newspapers in New Zealand. Following his return to New Zealand, these letters formed the basis of a book, entitled With the New Zealanders at the front: a story of twelve months' campaigning in South Africa. In the book, he commented extensively on the competence of British Army officers as well as the treatment of soldiers.

== Interwar period ==
Twisleton based himself near Gisborne and took up farming. In 1905, he married Emily Mary Speedy, and the couple would go on to have two daughters. In 1911 he became involved with the Legion of Frontiersmen, an organisation which found favour with many veterans from the Boer War like Twisleton. It was run along military lines with imperialist sympathies with an aim to provide men with military skills should they be required for service in the British Empire. Twisleton was involved in organising and training of a squadron of horsemen for the Legion's Poverty Bay branch. He eventually was appointed the New Zealand commandant of the Legion.

== First World War ==
After the Legion's offer of the services of two squadrons of horsemen was rejected by the New Zealand government following the outbreak of the First World War, Twisleton enlisted in the New Zealand Expeditionary Force. He was assigned to the Otago Mounted Rifles Regiment, with which he landed at Gallipoli nearly a month after the Landing at Anzac Cove on 25 April 1915. As a lieutenant, he continued his letter–writing habits of the Boer War, regularly describing life in the trenches in correspondence home. As with his previous writing, British officers were often the subject of criticism. He was awarded the Military Cross for his services during the Gallipoli Campaign, which saw him involved in the Battle of Hill 60. He was also mentioned in despatches. He became ill with dysentery and was evacuated from Gallipoli in September 1915.

After recovering his health, Twisleton was posted to the New Zealand Pioneer Battalion, which was a mainly Māori unit but with a company drawn from the Otago Mounted Rifles. Promoted to captain, Twisleton served with the battalion on the Western Front from March 1916 to August 1917. His wife and daughters had moved to England and he was able to regularly see them when on leave. In October 1917 he was transferred to the Auckland Mounted Rifles Regiment, which was serving in the Palestine Theatre of Operations and shortly afterwards was promoted to major and given command of a squadron of horsemen. On 14 November 1917, he was involved in the Battle of Ayun Kara and was severely wounded. He died of his wounds the next day. He is buried at Ramleh War Cemetery, in Israel.

After Twisleton's death, the Legion of Frontiersmen recognised his services with the Pioneer Axe, its highest award. His widow was made an honorary lieutenant of the Legion.
