= Kyburg massacre =

1349 antisemitic massacre in Switzerland

Coordinates: 47.4585°N 8.7435°E

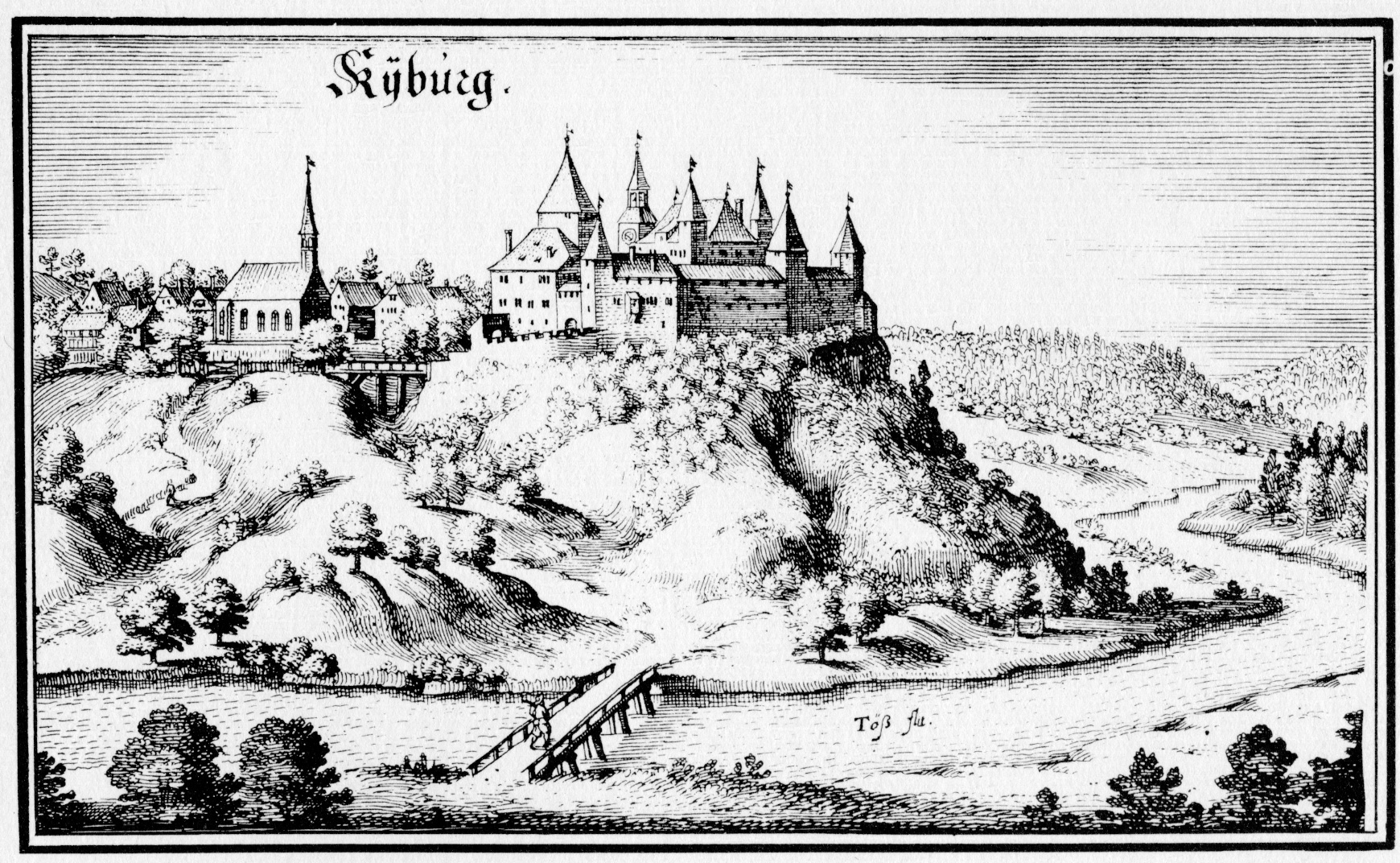
- Kyburg Castle in a 1642 engraving
- Date: September 18, 1349
- Location: Kyburg castle, Kyburg, Zurich
- Cause: Anti-Semitism (Alleged well poisoning)
- Deaths: 330 Jews

The Kyburg massacre was an anti-Semitic episode in Kyburg near Winterthur, present-day Switzerland, which occurred in 1349. Jews had sought refuge in the castle of Kyburg from the surrounding cities of Winterthur and Diessenhofen, as well as from all towns under the hegemony of the Duke of Austria. They had probably started to gather there in November 1348, when the first Black Death persecutions started. Probably pressured by the other Imperial cities, Albert II, Duke of Austria eventually ordered the Jews to be put to death by burning.

On 18 September 1349, 330 Jews were burned in the fortress. The Kyburg massacre was one of the deadliest massacres of Jews in Swiss areas.

== Background ==
Following the start of the Black Death persecutions, many Jews of Switzerland sought refuge at the Kyburg castle, where they probably started to gather since November 1348. They came from the surrounding cities of Diessenhofen and Winterthur, plus all the towns ruled by the Duke of Austria, "who protected them" (Alliis oppidis ducis Austrie qui ipsos defendebat). It is also possible that some Zurich Jews, survivors of the Zurich massacre (February 1349), made it to the fortress. Included among the towns from which the Jews gathered here is Aarau, in Aargau.

== The Massacre ==
There seems to have been pressure placed on Albert to kill the Jews in the fortress, coming from the other Imperial cities, who had already exterminated their own Jews. The Duke, who was also protecting the Jews in Pfirt and Alsace beside those gathered at Kyburg, was apparently told to burn the Jews himself, or else the cities would burn them on their own. Seeing the inevitable fate of the Jews, but fearing the cities would gain more autonomy if he didn't burn the Jews himself, the Duke decided to order the burning of the Jews in Kyburg. Augusta Steinberg observed that the Duke "wanted to maintain the authority over his own lands and play the executioner". In September of 1349, the Duke finally caved in and ordered the Jews to be burned (Sed dux per suis iudices madavit eos cremari).

On 18 September 1349, 330 Jews who had taken refuge in the castle were burned within the fortress.
