= 25th (Frontiersmen) Battalion, Royal Fusiliers =

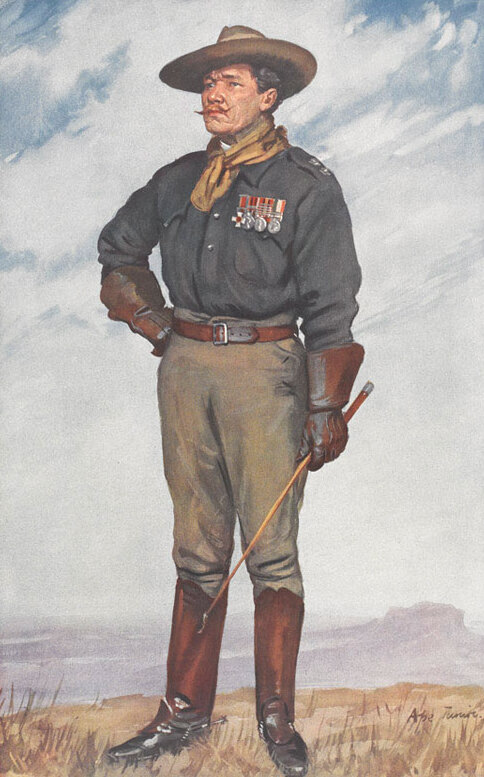
Lieutenant-colonel Daniel Patrick Driscoll, who raised the battalion

The 25th (Frontiersmen) Battalion, Royal Fusiliers was an infantry battalion of the British Army's Royal Fusiliers which was active during World War I. It was raised by the Legion of Frontiersmen. It served in the African Theatre of the war from 1915 to 1918, centered mostly in the area around Lake Tanganyika, British East African and German East African territory.

The battalion was largely composed of older men who hailed from diverse backgrounds and varied occupations, some of whom were Boer War veterans. Amongst these occupations were English big-game hunters, a British millionaire, several American cowboys, a Scottish light-house keeper, a naturalist, a circus clown, an Arctic explorer, an opera singer, a photographer, and a lion tamer. There were also French Foreign Legionaries and Russians (reportedly prison escapees from Siberia).

The unit was formed on 12 February 1915 by Lieutenant-colonel Daniel Patrick Driscoll, who was, at that time, fifty-five years of age, well above that of an average soldier. Another noted serving officer (and eventually the Second in Command of the battalion) was Frederick Courteney Selous, a veteran of various small African wars and skirmishes, a big-game hunter and friend of Theodore Roosevelt. Selous had previously hunted with Roosevelt during his famed 1909 African safari. Selous is also known for having served as the inspiration for Sir H. Rider Haggard to create his fictional Allan Quatermain character, a 19th-century African explorer and hunter of big-game beasts. Selous was later killed in action with the unit, shot through the mouth by a German sniper in January 1917.

The unit gained the nickname "Old and the Bold", due to its members' ages, their veteran status, and reputation for endurance and daring against the enemy, even though the majority of volunteers were young men. The battalion was disbanded on 19 June 1918. The exploits of "The Old and the Bold" were later the loose basis of The Young Indiana Jones Chronicles episode "The Phantom Train of Doom" (German East Africa, November 1916). Veteran Raiders of the Lost Ark actor Paul Freeman portrayed Selous as an adventurous, cunning, yet decisive commander.
