= Kyburg (castle) =

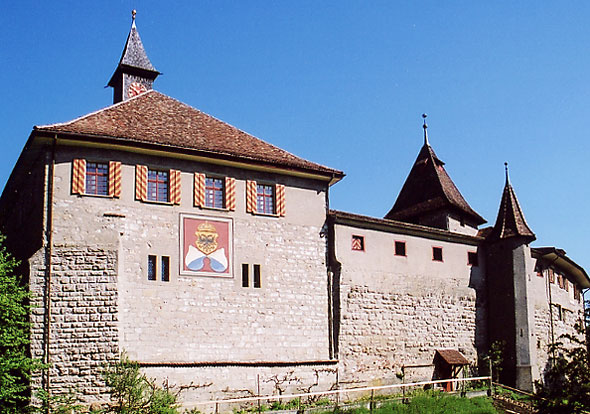
- Schloss Kyburg

- Location within Canton of Zurich Location within Switzerland

General information
- Classification: Swiss heritage site of national significance
- Location: 8314 Kyburg, Switzerland
- Coordinates: 47.458384°N 8.743380°E
- Construction started: c. 1030
- Completed: c. 1530

Website
- www.schlosskyburg.ch

Kyburg Castle (German: Schloss Kyburg) is a castle in Switzerland, overlooking the Töss river about 3 km south-east of Winterthur, in Kyburg municipality, canton of Zürich. It is a Swiss heritage site of national significance.

== History ==
The first fortification at this site was likely built in the second half of the 10th century by the counts of Winterthur. It is first mentioned in 1027 under the name of Chuigeburg ("cows-fort"), which name points to an original use as a refuge castle for livestock. The modern spelling Kyburg first occurs in the 1230s (other spellings of the 11th to 13th century include Chiuburch, Cogiburk, Kuiburc, Chuͦweburg, Chyburc, Qwiburg, Kiburc, Chiburg, Kibor, Kyburc, Kiburg).

The early castle was destroyed in 1028 or 1030 by emperor Conrad II. It was rebuilt and soon became the center of the county of Kyburg which was formed in 1053 as a possession of the counts of Dillingen. In 1079, during the Investiture Controversy, the castle was attacked and partially destroyed by Abbot Ulrich II of St. Gall. By 1096, the counts of Dillingen included a count of Kyburg as one of their titles. By 1180, the counts of Kyburg emerged as a cadet line of the Dillingen family. They rose to be the most important noble family in the Swiss Plateau beside the Habsburg and the House of Savoy by the 13th century.

After the death of the last count in 1264, Rudolph of Habsburg claimed the inheritance for his family. With one interruption, the Imperial Regalia of the Holy Roman Empire were kept in the castle between 1273 and 1322.

In 1349, 330 Jews were burned within the fortress. This was one of the deadliest pogroms in Swiss areas.

The core of the extant castle originates in the 13th century, with the addition of substantial parts in the course of the 13th and 14th centuries. It is among the largest surviving medieval castle complexes in Switzerland, consisting of a bergfried and palas with additional residential and economic buildings and a chapel, all connected by a ring wall enclosing a large courtyard.

In 1424, the city of Zürich bought the county, and the castle became the seat of the reeve. The dilapidated castle was substantially renovated at this time. The chapel has substantial late Gothic frescoes commissioned by Zürich. Substantial changes to the structure were made under reeve Hans Rudolf Lavater during 1527/8. Further changes were made to the structure in the early modern period.

The castle was plundered by the local populace in 1798, but it was again used as an administrative seat from 1803 until 1831, when it was sold by auction to one Franz Heinrich Hirzel of Winterthur who intended to use it as a quarry. To prevent its destruction, the castle was bought by the exiled Polish count Alexander Sobansky (1799–1861) in 1835. Sobansky resided in the castle for the next 30 years. In 1865 the castle was opened as a "Castle and Art Museum" by Matthäus Pfau. Under the next owner, Eduard Bodmer, the museum remained open. In 1917, the Canton of Zurich bought the castle back. The castle has been run by the Verein Museum Schloss Kyburg since 1999.

In 2021–2022, a 14th-century gauntlet was discovered near Kyberg during an archeological excavation.

== Events ==
Every summer the Kyburgiade, an international chamber music festival, takes place in the inner courtyard of the castle.

== Castle site ==
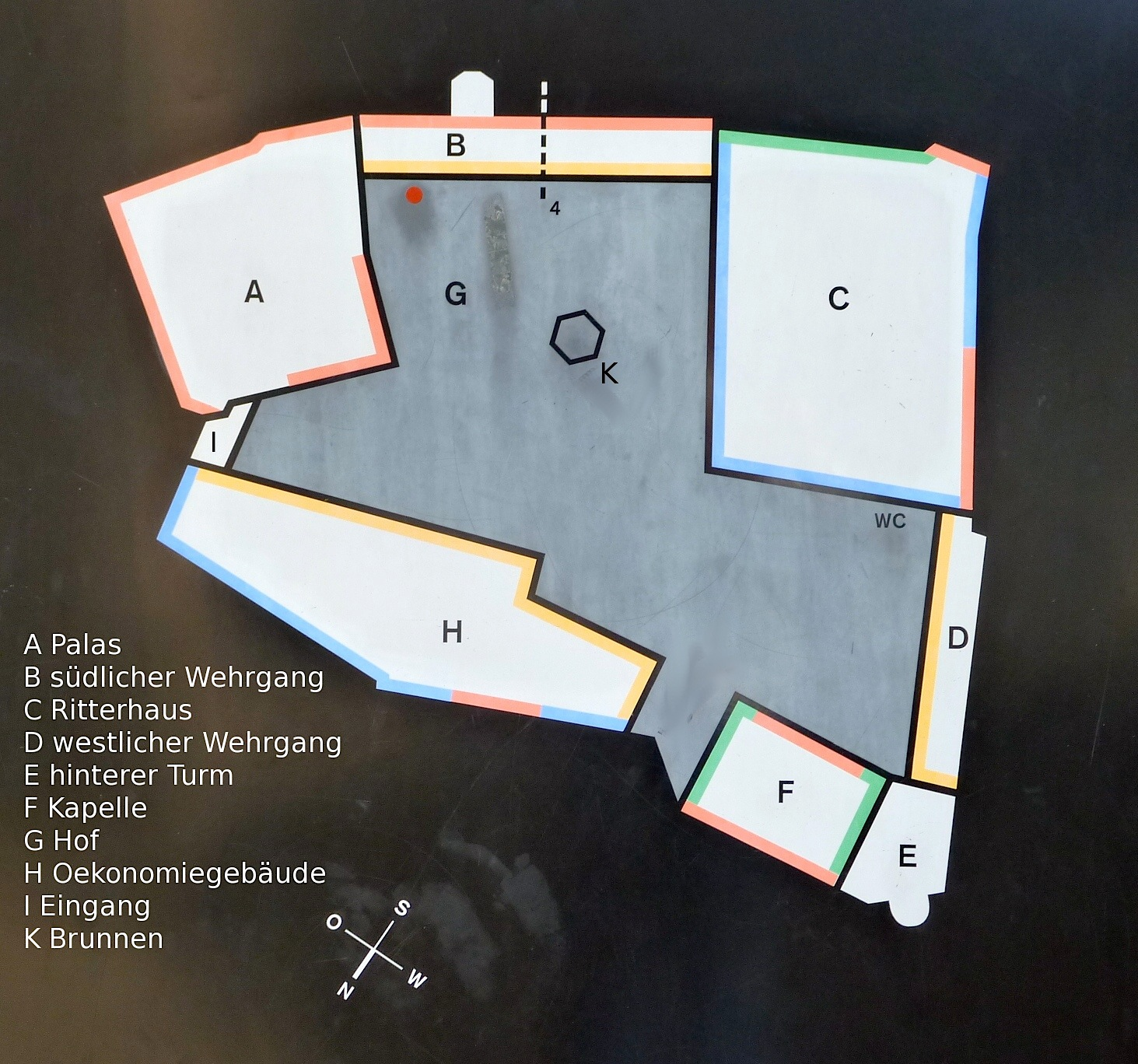
Plan of the castle, North is toward left bottom. A - Palas; B - South Wall; C - Knights' Hall; D - West Wall; E - Far Tower; F - Chapel; G - Courtyard; H - Barn and Stable; I - Entrance; K - Well

The castle forms an irregular quadrangle with a single courtyard atop a steep hill above the Töss valley. South of the castle, between the medieval neck ditches, is the French formal garden which was designed in 1700 by Caspar Schwarzenbach. The entrance to the castle is through the outer gate located on the north-east corner. The gate house was rebuilt in 1579-80 and decorated with coats of arms by Christoph and Josias Murer. A zwinger, or narrow, defensive passage, leads from the outer gate to the inner gate. A walkway goes over the zwinger and connects the palas, or great hall, with the Willenturm (Willen tower) on the north corner of the castle. The inner gate is protected by the bergfried, which was built in 1424 with the addition of a roof in 1444.

== Gallery ==
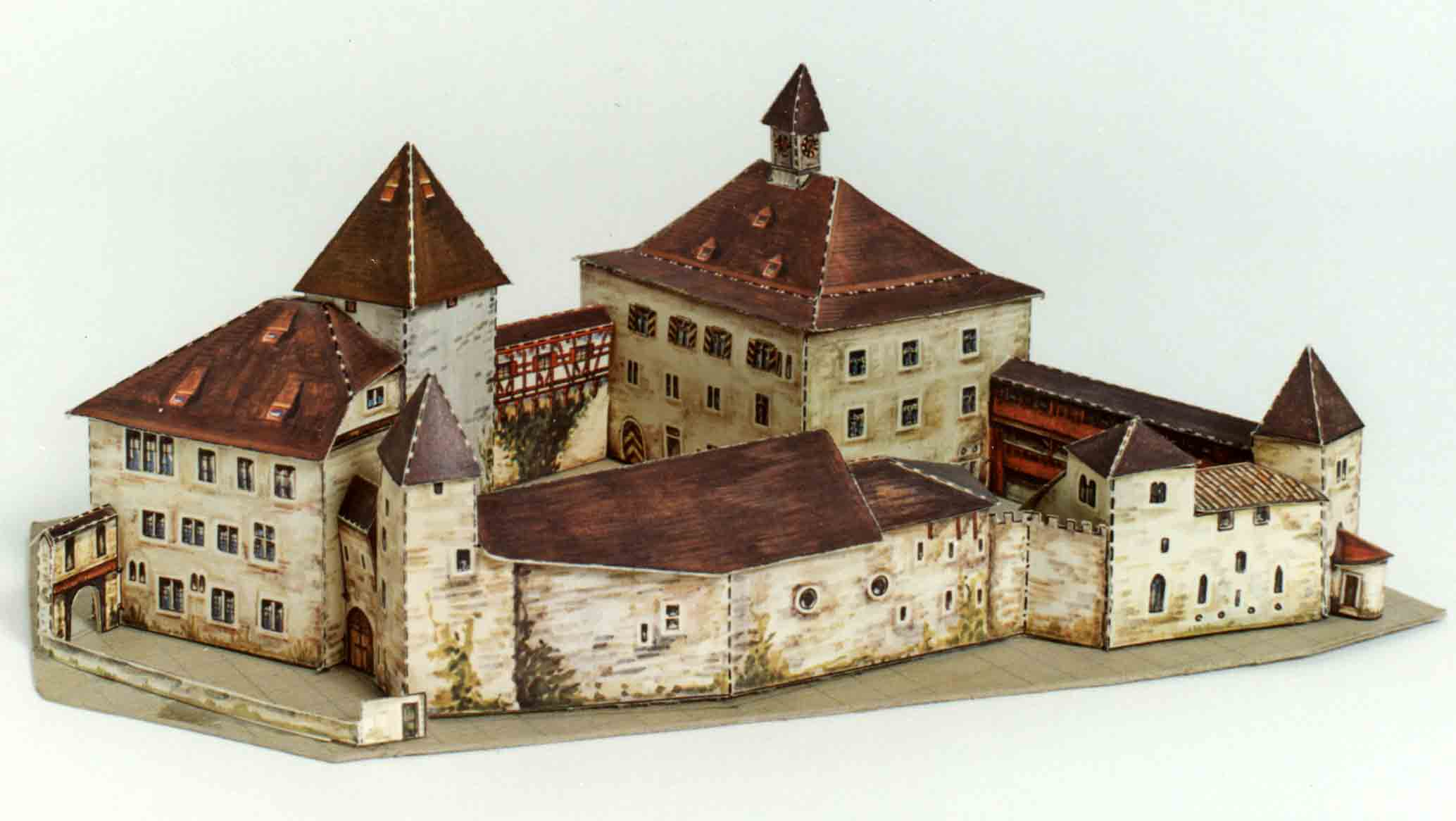
Cardboard model (Modellbogen) of the castle

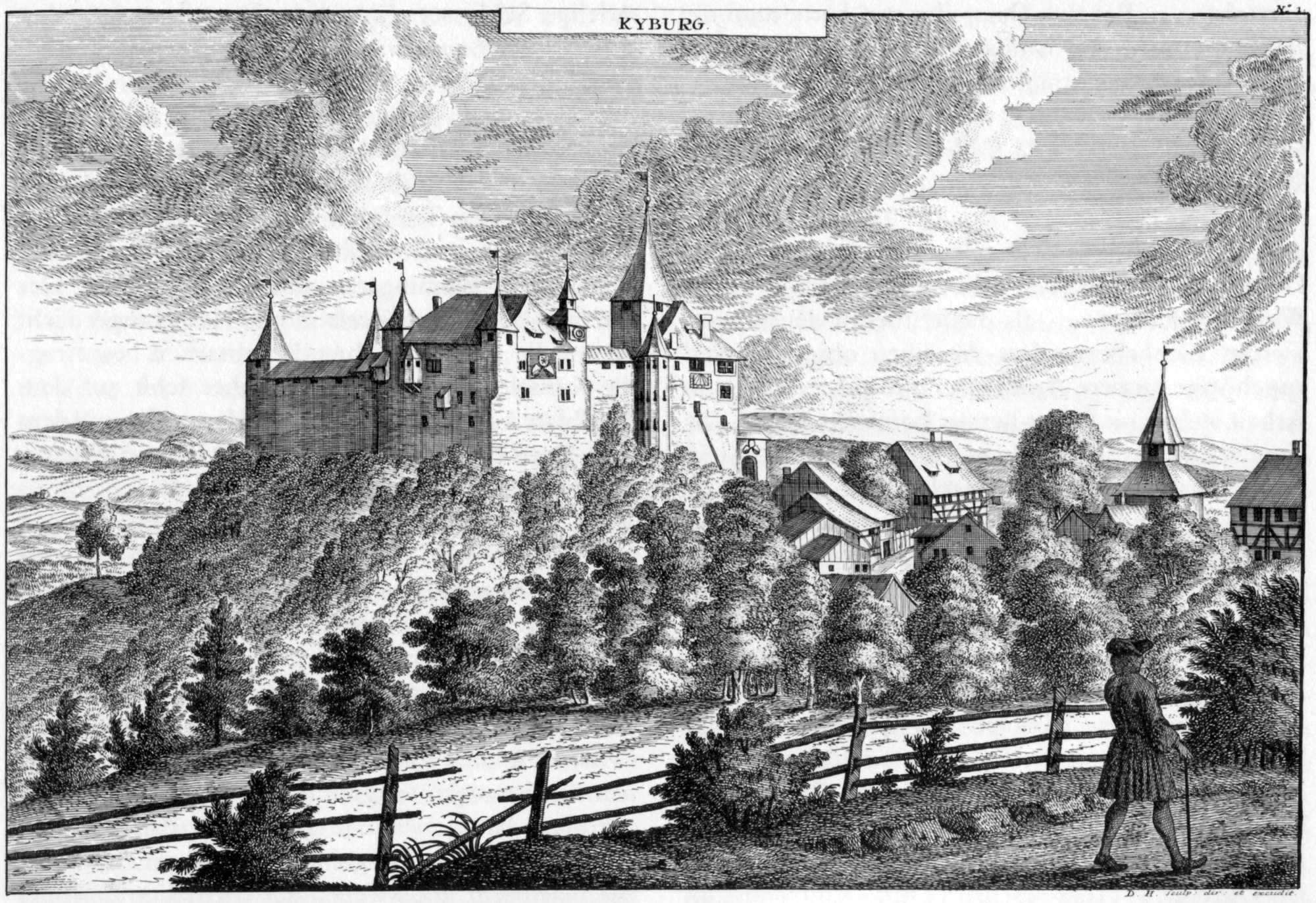
Kyburg in 1740

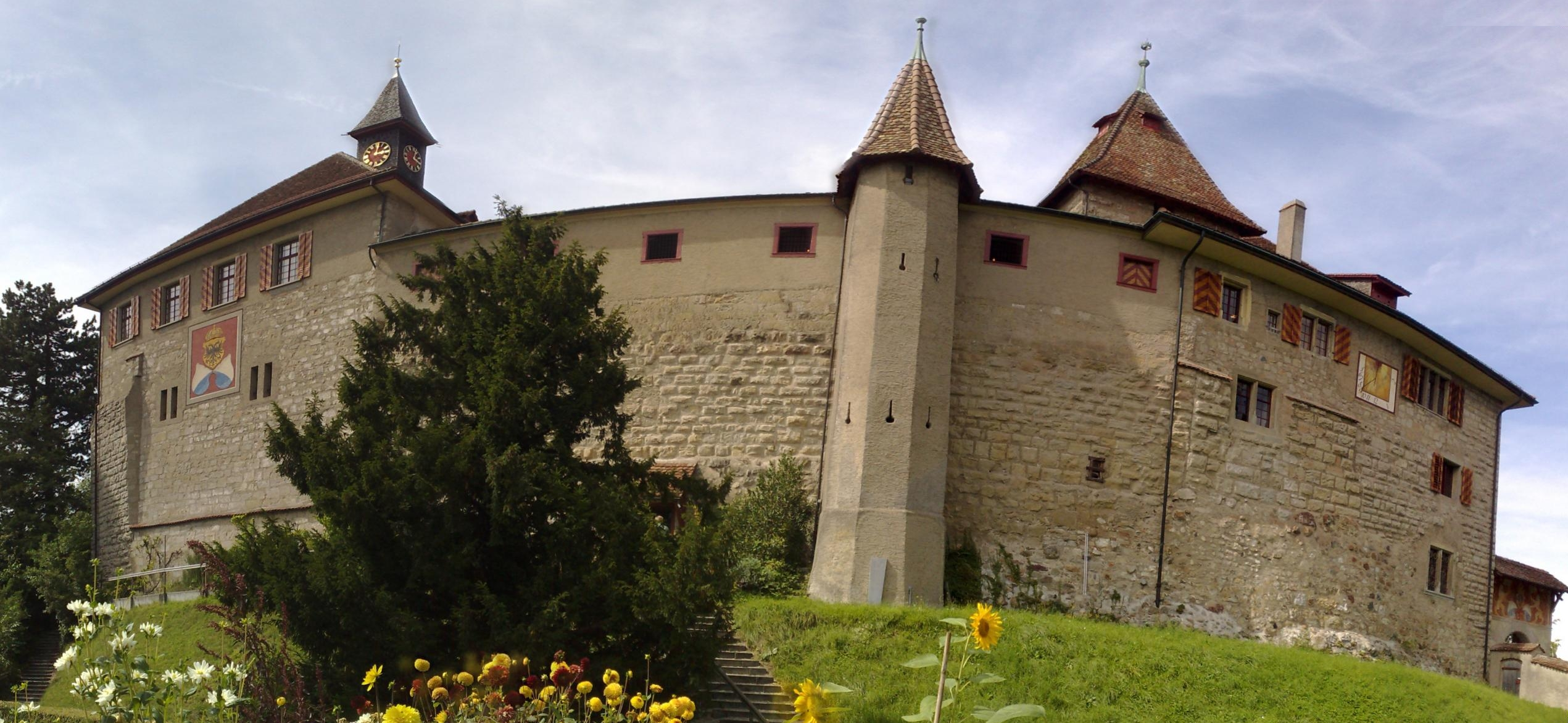
Panoramic view

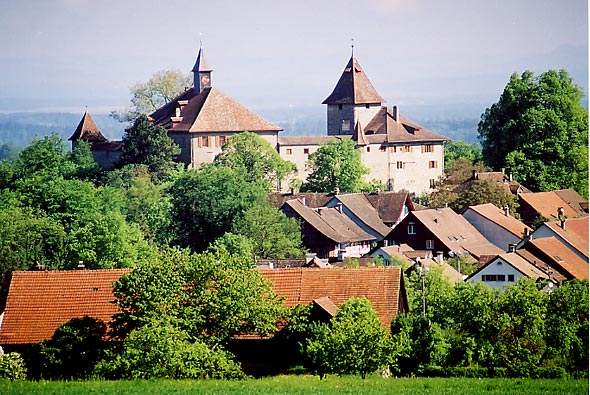
General view

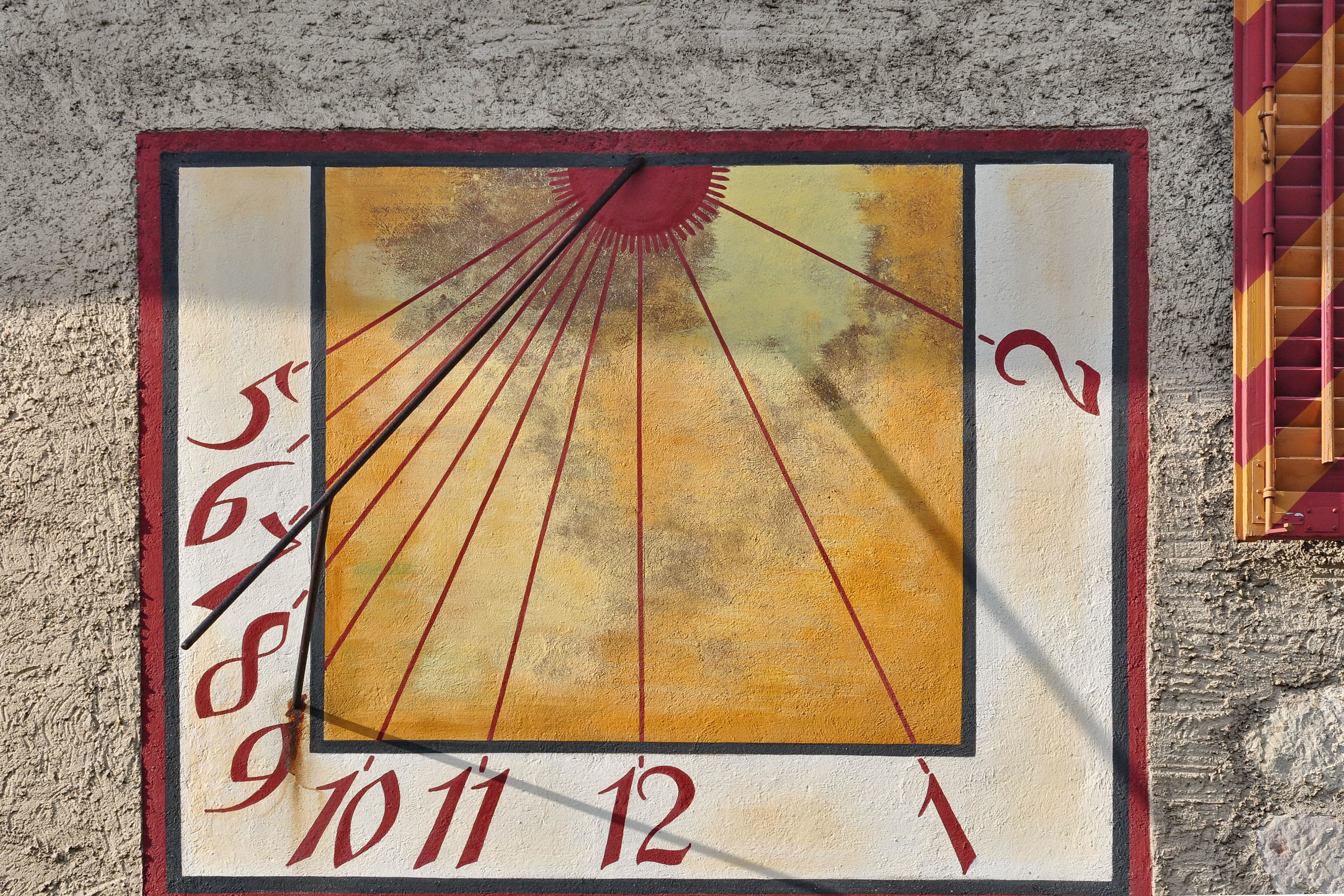
Sundial

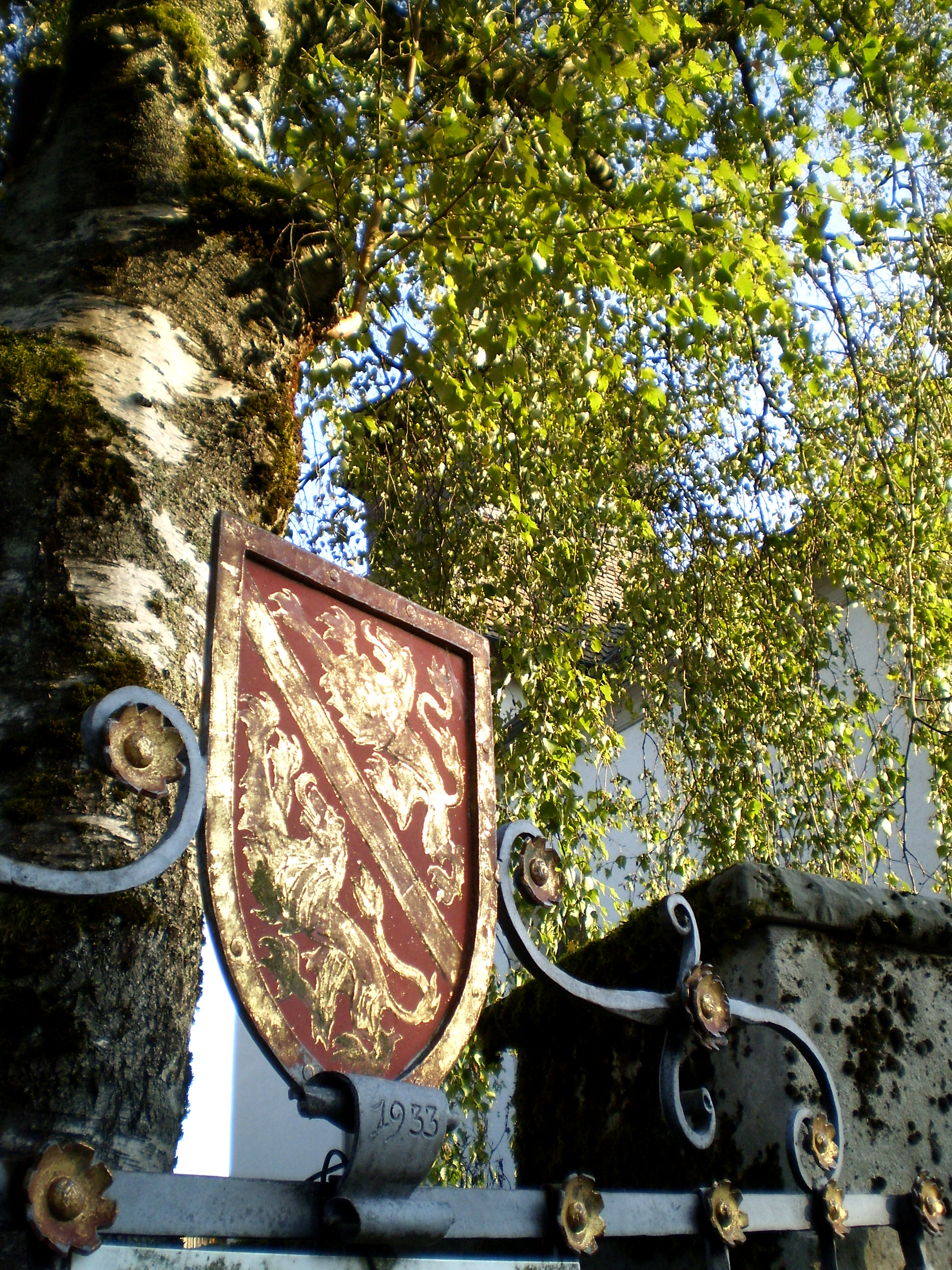
Coat of arms

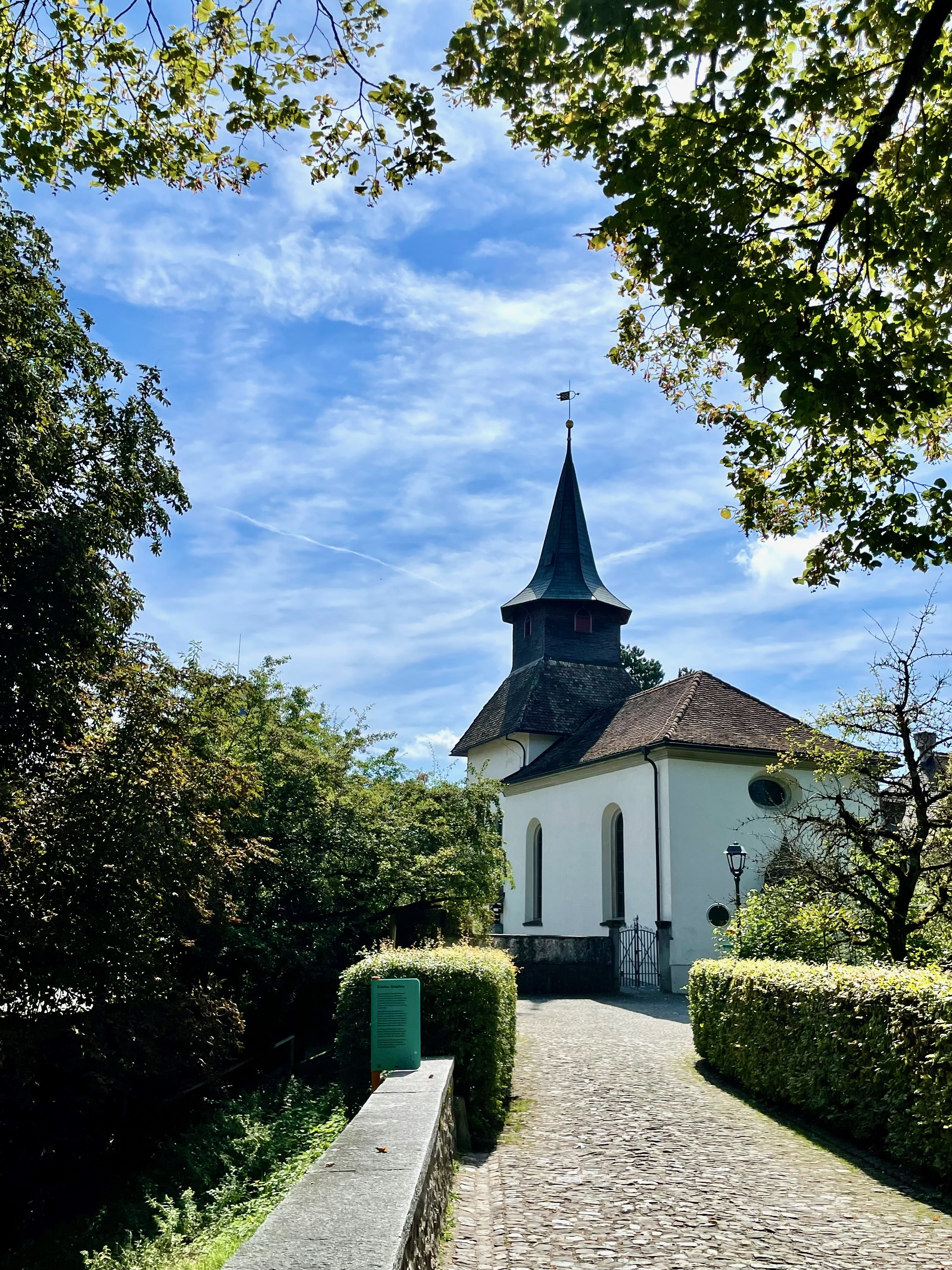
Village church seen from castle entrance

== See also ==
- List of castles in Switzerland
