= Daniel Patrick Driscoll =

British army officer (1862–1934)

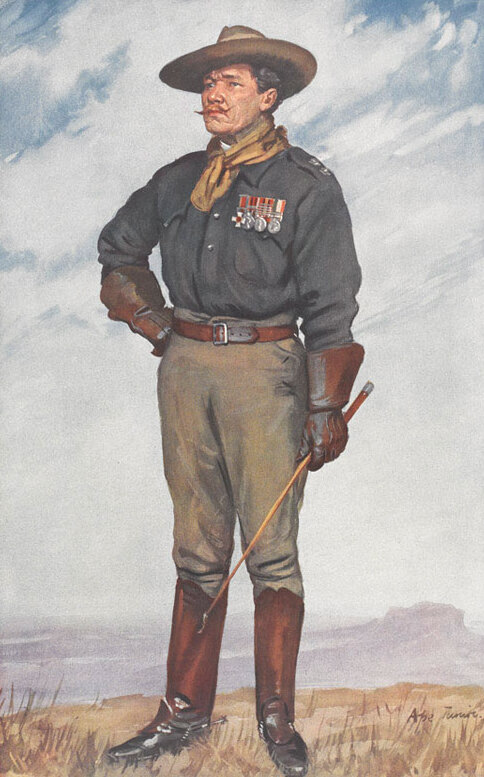
Caricature of Driscoll by "Ape Junior" published in Vanity Fair on 15 February 1911

Lieutenant-Colonel Daniel Patrick Driscoll DSO CMG (11 May 1862 – 6 August 1934) was a British Army officer who was awarded many military honours for his combat service in Burma, the Union of South Africa, and German East Africa in the First World War.

Driscoll served in the Merchant Navy from 1879 to 1882. He served in the Third Anglo-Burmese War. During the Second Boer War, Driscoll was a captain and later a lieutenant-colonel in command of the Driscoll Scouts, a reconnaissance unit that he formed despite some official opposition. For his combat service from 1900 to 1902 he was honoured with despatches twice, Queen's Medal with four clasps, King's medal with two clasps, and D.S.O. in 1900. Driscoll stayed in South Africa until after the end of the Second Boer War, and in November 1902 left Port Natal on the SS Ortona bound for Rangoon, British India.

At the start of the First World War, Driscoll wrote to the War Office with a suggestion for guerrilla warfare behind the German lines. In February 1915 he formed the 25th Battalion of the Royal Fusiliers with many recruits from the Legion of Frontiersmen.

Lieutenant Colonel Daniel Driscoll volunteered the service of his unit of a hundred Frontiersmen, envisaging their employment on the Western Front as behind-the-lines raiders. The offer was rejected and Driscoll took his Frontiermen to fight the Germans in their East Africa colony where they distinguished themselves in bush fighting. After the war, Driscoll retired to Kenya, where he died in 1934.

Driscoll was awarded the Croix de Guerre in May 1917 and appointed Companion of the Order of St Michael and St George (CMG) in March 1919.

In 1918 at the end of WWI he returned to his old job as Commandant General of Legion of Frontiersman, but resigned after becoming disillusioned with the way the organization was being run. In 1919 he sailed on the SS Durham Castle for Kenya where he became a Soldier Settler. He purchased a Coffee farm and subsequently became a District Commissioner.

On 9 June 1880 in Calcutta, he married Isabella Marchall; their marriage produced several children.
