= Legion of Frontiersmen =

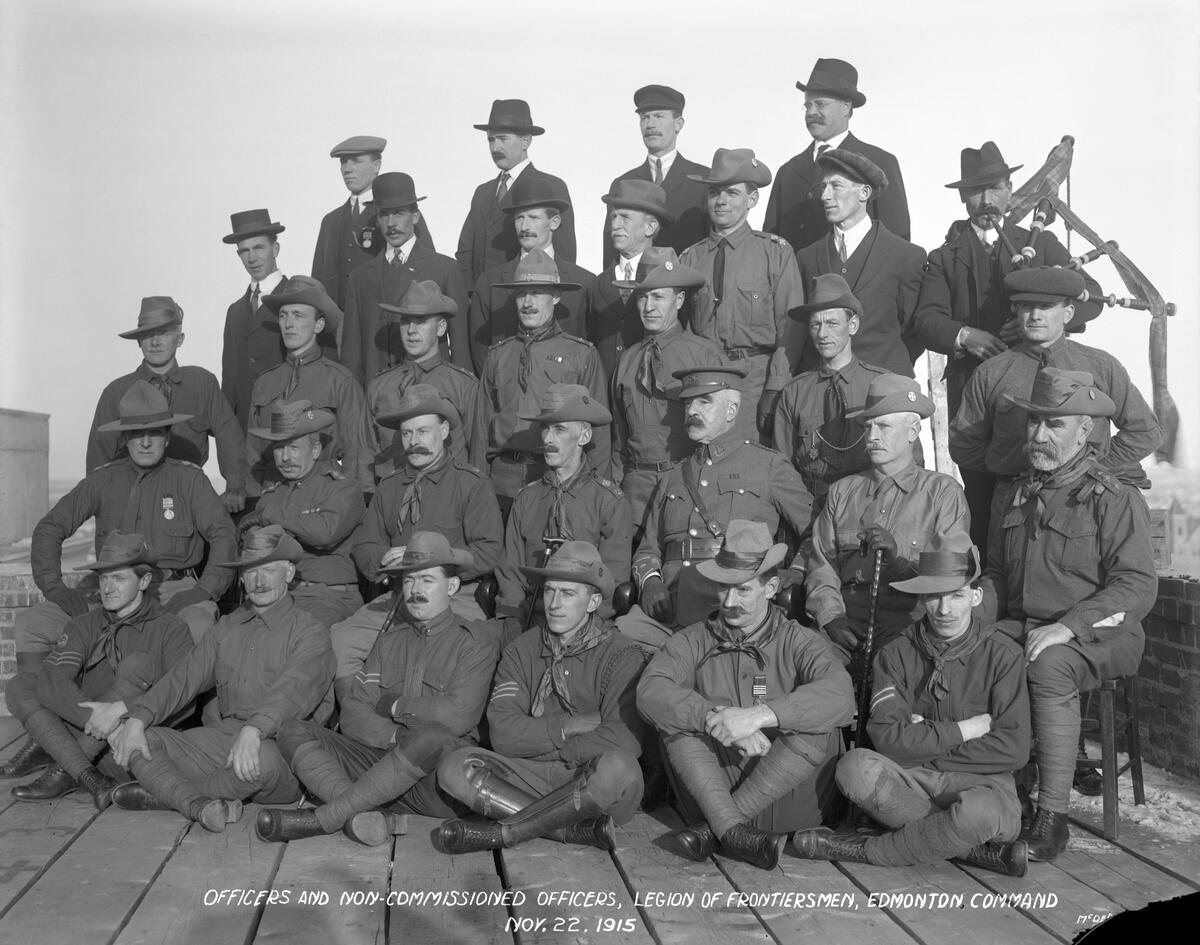
- Legion of Frontiersmen, Edmonton, Alberta, 1915
- Active: 1905–present
- Country: Commonwealth realms
- Role: Nationalist group
- Motto: God Guard Thee

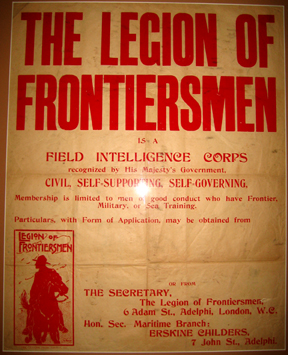
A Recruiting Poster, London; the contact was Erskine Childers

The Legion of Frontiersmen is a civilian nationalist paramilitary organisation formed in Britain in 1905 by Roger Pocock, a former North-West Mounted Police constable and Boer War veteran. Prompted by fears of an impending invasion of Britain and the Empire, the organisation was founded to be a field intelligence corps that would watch over and protect the boundaries of the Empire. Headquartered in London, the Legion of Frontiersmen formed branches throughout the Empire to prepare enlistees for war and foster vigilance in peacetime. Despite their efforts, the Legion never achieved significant official recognition, in part because many Commonwealth nations' laws prohibit militia groups.

Casualties in the First World War devastated the Legion of Frontiersmen, and except for a brief resurgence in the interwar period, a series of schisms and sectarianism prevented attempts to reinvigorate the movement. In the late 1930s, the Legion of Frontiersmen in Canada was formally affiliated with the Royal Canadian Mounted Police, but after a schism split within the Canadian Frontiersmen, the RCMP severed formal ties. Various Legion of Frontiersmen groups still exist throughout the Commonwealth, but as a whole, it has been unable to define its niche post World War II; especially because the organisation generally refuses to provide information about its activities to prospective applicants.

== First World War ==
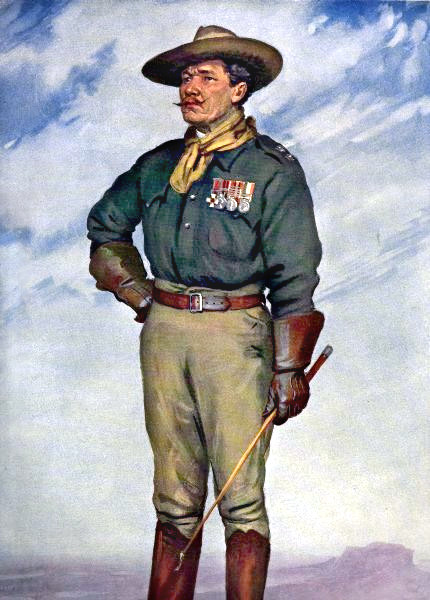
Colonel Daniel Patrick Driscoll DSO, Vanity Fair caricature 15 February 1911. Driscoll later raised the 25th Battalion, Royal Fusiliers from Frontiersmen

During the First World War, the Legion of Frontiersmen helped raise and fill the ranks of the Princess Patricia's Canadian Light Infantry, the 19th Alberta Dragoons, the 49th Battalion - Canadian Expeditionary Force (today's Loyal Edmonton Regiment), the 210th Battalion (Frontiersmen), - Canadian Expeditionary Force, the 25th (Frontiersmen) Battalion, Royal Fusiliers, and the Newfoundland Regiment. Despite the nature of the organisation, many of its members had no military experience and were probably no better (or worse) than other recruits to other wartime raised units.

== Uniforms ==
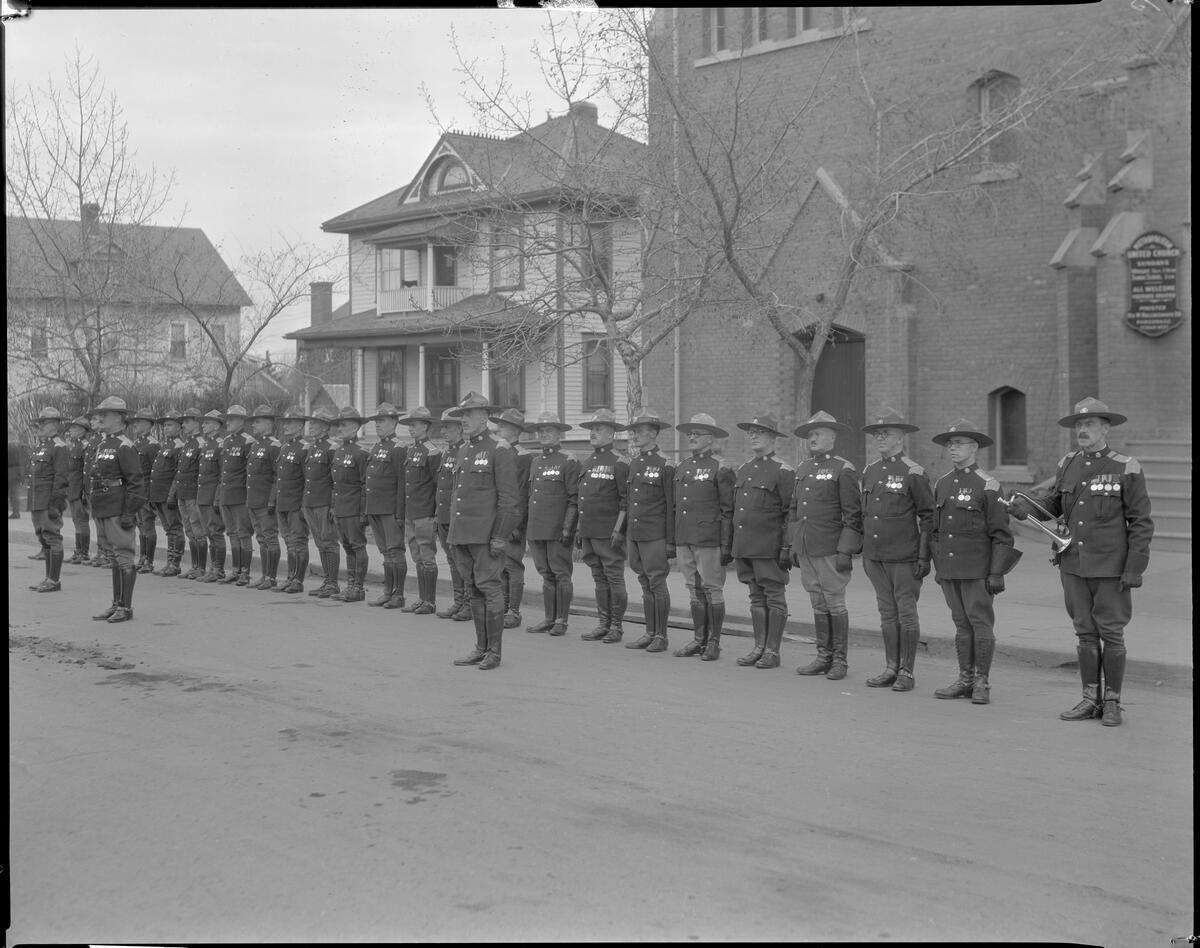
Edmonton Command, 1930

The earliest official description of an authorized uniform for a Canadian unit is noted in The Frontiersman, (December 1912, page 223) describing Vernon and Okanagan Command's uniform as follows: "Shirt Tunic – To be of substantial material, colour navy blue; leather buttons; nickel shoulder chains. Breeches or (Trousers) – Any shade of khaki. Footwear – Brown leather; any combination that affords cover as high as the calves. Headdress – Straight brim Stetson, any shade of brown, with leather band and regimental crest and monogram. Accessories – Brown leather fringed gauntlets; silk blue and white "bird's-eye" neckerchief; regulation LF holster."

== Decorations ==
Branches of the legion, in different parts of the Commonwealth award medals within their units and occasionally to external branches, commands, or units. The Australian Division awards a decoration called the "Australian Medal of Merit" and within the organisation has used the post nominal letters AMM. On occasion, such medal names and use of post nominal letters has caused controversy.

== Members ==
- Patrick William Forbes
- William Le Queux
- Basil Lubbock
- Roger Pocock
- Ethel Pritchard
- Charles G. D. Roberts
- John Shiwak
- Francis Morphet Twisleton
- Arthur Owen Vaughan
- Joseph Conrad
- Ernest Shackleton

== Sources ==
- Christopher M. Andrew, Secret Service: The Making of the British Intelligence Community. London: Trafalgar Square, 1985. ISBN 978-0-340-40430-0
- Robert H. MacDonald, Sons of the Empire: The Frontier and the Boy Scout Movement, 1890–1918. Toronto: University of Toronto Press, 1993. ISBN 978-0-8020-2843-3
- John Fisher. Gentleman Spies: intelligence agents in the British Empire and beyond. Stroud, UK: Sutton, 2002. ISBN 0-7509-2698-8
- Geoffrey A. Pocock. One Hundred Years of the Legion of Frontiersmen. Chichester, UK: Phillimore, 2004. ISBN 978-1-86077-282-5
