= Overview of gun laws by nation =

Regulations on arms and ammunition

Gun laws and policies, collectively referred to as firearms regulation or gun control, regulate the manufacture, sale, transfer, possession, modification, and use of small arms by civilians. Laws of some countries may afford civilians a right to keep and bear arms, and have more liberal gun laws than neighboring jurisdictions. Gun control typically restricts access to certain categories of firearms and limits the categories of persons who may be granted permission to access firearms. There may be separate licenses for hunting, sport shooting, self-defense, collecting, and concealed carry, each with different sets of requirements, privileges, and responsibilities.

Gun laws are usually justified by a legislature's intent to curb the usage of small arms in crime, and to this end they frequently target types of arms identified in crimes and shootings, such as handguns and other types of concealable firearms. Semi-automatic rifle designs which are derived from service rifles, sometimes colloquially referred to as assault rifles, often face additional scrutiny from lawmakers. Persons restricted from legal access to firearms may include those below a certain age or those with a criminal record. Firearms licenses to purchase or possess may be denied to those defined as most at risk of harming or murdering themselves or others, persons with a history of domestic violence, alcohol use disorder or substance use disorder, mental illness, depression, or those who have attempted suicide. Those applying for a firearm license may need to demonstrate competence by completing a gun safety course and/or show provisions for a secure location to store weapons.

The legislation which restricts small arms may also restrict other weapons, such as explosives, crossbows, swords, electroshock weapons, air guns, and pepper spray. It may also restrict firearm accessories, notably high-capacity magazines, sound suppressors, and devices such as auto sears, which enable fully automatic fire. There may be restrictions on the quantity or types of ammunition purchased, with certain types prohibited. Due to the global scope of this article, detailed coverage cannot be provided on all these matters; the article will instead attempt to briefly summarize each country's weapon laws in regard to small arms use and ownership by civilians.

== Vocabulary and terminology ==
Firearms are not defined the same way in each country.

Some terms are used in several countries in the context of gun laws. These include the following:

- shall-issue: granting of a required permit or license is subject only to the applicant's meeting determinate criteria laid out in the law; the granting authority has no discretion in the awarding of licenses.
- may-issue: granting of a required permit or license is partially at the discretion of local authorities. Some jurisdictions may provide administrative and legal avenues for an applicant to appeal a permit denial, while others may not.
- no-issue: granting of a required permit or license is forbidden, or, at most, allowed only in certain very limited circumstances.

Gun laws might be classified by countries according to some specific common characteristics:

- Yemen does not require any permit or any license for the acquisition or selling of any types of firearms, including fully automatic firearms.
- Most U.S. states do not require any permit or any license for the acquisition or selling of most types of firearms, meaning they're sold over the counter and no license is required for buying a great number of firearms. Citizens (excluding prohibited persons in the latter case) may freely buy them from licensed and state authorized dealers or suppliers.
- Some countries including Austria, Liechtenstein, Philippines, and Switzerland are partially licensed, meaning that any non-prohibited citizen may buy repeating rifles and break-action shotguns from licensed dealers and a permit is required only for handguns and semi-automatic firearms.
- Some countries allow firearm ownership without good reason or with a simple declaration of reason. For example, in Austria, while the law requires an applicant to have good reason to acquire a license for a handgun, self-defense at home is accepted as a good reason. Canada and New Zealand do not require good reason for applicants' acquisition of most types of long guns, although they require it for restricted weapons like handguns.
- Some countries require an applicant to show good reason to secure a firearm license. In some, like Poland and Malta, the list of good reasons and conditions that must be met is explicitly stated in the law. In others, like Kenya and the United Kingdom, the law does not specify what constitutes a good reason and leaves it at the discretion of authorities, but good or legitimate reasons for obtaining a firearm are hunting, sport shooting, collecting, and self defense.
- In some countries, like China, Japan, Venezuela and Myanmar, only people that are abled and trained and are meeting narrow conditions are allowed to own firearms, and few licenses are issued.
- In some countries, including Cambodia, Eritrea, and the Solomon Islands, private ownership of firearms by civilians is completely prohibited. There may be exceptions for private security companies, militias and paramilitary groups.

== Firearms license ==
A firearms license (also known as a gun license; or licence in British English) is a license or permit issued by a government authority (typically by the police) of a jurisdiction, that allows the licensee to buy, own, possess, or carry a firearm, often subject to a number of conditions or restrictions, especially with regard to storage requirements or the completion of a firearms safety course, as well as background checks, etc. Firearms licenses are not required in all jurisdictions. Additionally, some countries or states may require by law a "permit-to-purchase" in order to buy handguns or firearms. A licence may also be required to buy ammunition.

The permit or license scope varies according to what firearm(s) or activity(s) it allows the holder to legally do with the firearm. Some jurisdictions may require a firearm license to own a firearm, to engage in hunting, target shooting or collecting, or to carry a concealed firearm, or operate a business (such as being a gun dealer or a gunsmith). Some jurisdictions may require separate licenses for rifles, shotguns or handguns.

The requirement to have a firearm license is usually in addition to a requirement for firearm registration. For example, gun laws in Australia require firearms to be registered by serial number to the owner, who holds a firearm licence.

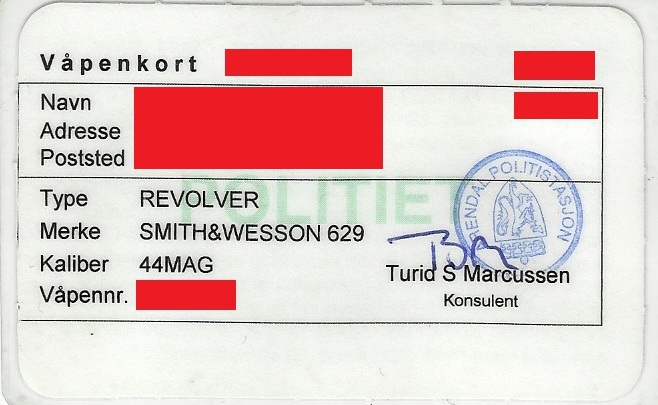
A Norwegian firearms license for a .44 Magnum revolver, with name and address of the owner, as well as firearm type, brand, caliber and serial number

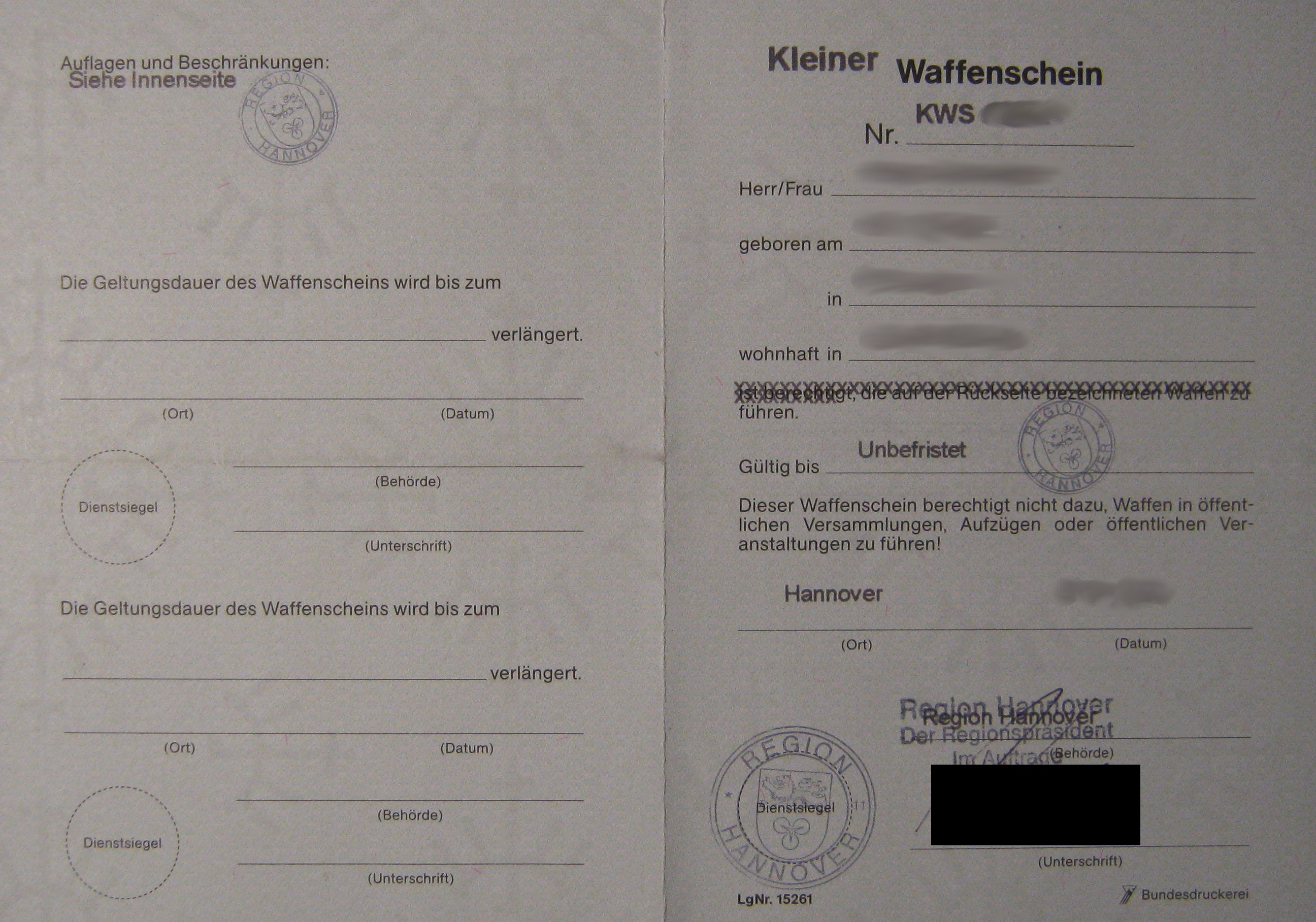
A German firearms license

== Comparison ==
This section uses the expressions shall issue and may issue which are partly specific to and defined by the US system of firearm regulations.

=== Maps ===
Possession of long guns by country:

No permit required for semi-automatic long guns
Partially licensed – repeating long guns permitless, semi-automatic with permit
Allowed with permit – no good reason required or simple declaration of reason^{1}
Allowed with permit – good reason (like sport shooting license or proving danger to life required). ^{1}
Prohibited with exceptions or prohibited in practice – few licenses are issued
Prohibited – Civilians are banned from obtaining long guns
.
Different rules regarding shotguns and rifles
^{1}Some countries in these categories may place additional restrictions or ban semi-automatic long guns.

Notes:

- Map describes policy regarding obtaining new firearms regardless of whether firearms that were produced before the ban were grandfathered.

Possession of handguns by country:

No permit required – Permits or licenses are not required to obtain handguns.
Allowed with permit – no good reason required or simple declaration of reason
Allowed with permit – good reason (like sport shooting license or proving danger to life) required
Prohibited with exceptions or prohibited in practice – few licenses are issued
Prohibited – Civilians are banned from obtaining handguns.

Notes:

- Map describes policy regarding obtaining new firearms regardless of whether firearms that were produced before the ban were grandfathered.

=== Table ===
Gun laws worldwide
Region	Good reason		Permitted types of firearms				Carrying firearms		Magazine capacity limits (Note: P – pistol, S – shotgun, R – rifle, CF – centerfire, RF – rimfire, SA – semi-automatic, LG – long guns e.g: SACFR: semi-automatic centerfire rifle)	Free of registration	Max penalty (years)
Region	Good reason required?	Personal protection	Long guns (exc. semi- and full-auto)	Handguns	Semi-automatic rifles	Fully automatic firearms	Open carry	Concealed carry	Magazine capacity limits	Free of registration	Max penalty (years)
Independent countries
Afghanistan (Note: Afghanistan: Law on Firearms, Ammunitions and Explosives, 2005)	Not for shotguns and antique firearms	Restricted	Yes – shall issue	Restricted	Restricted	Private security companies	Private security companies	Restricted	No	No	
Albania (Note: Albania: Law on Weapons, 2014)	Yes – hunting and sport shooting	Proof of threat to life required	Yes – shall issue	Self-defense permits	Yes – shall issue	No	No	Self-defense permits	3 (S,R)	No	
Algeria	Yes – hunting (restricted)	No	Shotguns and air rifles only	No	No	No	Yes	No (Note: While there is no explicit ban on concealed carry, ban on handguns makes it prohibited in practice.)	No	Yes	
Andorra (Note: Andorra: Decree on Possession of Firearms, 1989 (in Catalan))	No (with exceptions) Exceptions ISSF-approved pistols require membership in sport shooting organization	Yes – home defense	Shotguns – permitless, other under license	Yes – shall issue		No	Yes	Justification required	No	Yes	
Angola	Private security companies only		Restricted	Restricted	Restricted	No	Restricted	Restricted	None	Yes	
Antigua and Barbuda (Note: Antigua and Barbuda: Firearms Act, 1973)	Yes – unspecified (Note: Law requires good reason without stipulating what constitutes a good reason)		Yes – may issue	Yes – may issue	Yes – may issue	No	Maybe (Note: While law does not specifically address open carry it may be not allowed in practice and prosecuted under other laws such as causing panic in public)	Yes – may issue		No	5
Argentina	Yes – collecting, sport shooting, hunting	Yes – shall issue	Yes – shall issue			No	Proof of threat to life required – rarely granted	Proof of threat to life required – rarely granted	No	No	Three years; six for prohibited weapons
Armenia (Note: Armenia: Law on Weapons, 1998 (in Armenian))	Not for shotguns Rifles Five years of shotgun ownership required for rifles	Yes (shotguns only)	Yes – under license	No	Yes – under license	No	No	No		No	
Australia	Yes – see table	No	May issue – shall issue in practice (Note: Around 95% of firearm applications granted.)	May issue – restricted	May issue – restricted	May issue - restricted in some states, otherwise No	No	No	Varies internally (Note: Category A and B licences - Depends on the state or territory for rifles and shotguns, except for lever-action shotguns, which are limited to a five round capacity. Category C licences - Rifles are limited to a ten round capacity and shotguns are limited to a five round capacity. Category D licences - None Category H licences - The genuine reason of sport/target shooting is limited to a ten round capacity, otherwise there is no limit.)	No	Determined by the courts (Note: Up to life imprisonment if caught using it for murder.)
Austria (EU) (Note: Austria: "Waffengesetz, 1996" (in German). 2019. Archived from the original on 25 October 2013.)	Simple declaration of reason (hunting, sport shooting, collection)	Some firearms permitless Most firearms shall issue	With background check Repeating, revolving and break-action rifles and break-action shotguns Shall-issue Repeating shotguns Restricted Pump-action shotguns	Yes – shall issue	Yes – shall issue	May issue – restricted (special federal permit required) (Note: In practice only granted to approved collectors, authorized experts, special licensed gunsmiths or similar persons, otherwise rarely issued)	Same as in case of concealed carry (Note: Must be carried in a way without public nuisance, unusual in civil clothing) Exceptions Permitless for members of traditional rifle clubs during ceremonial occasions and preparatory exercise for such occasions	May issue - restricted (Note: General population - must prove existence of genuine threat, wide discretion of deciding authority, restricted may issue Security personnel (police personal, military police personal or prison guard personal, even after retirement) - shall issue; Private Security (armored car drivers, bodyguards or similar security staff, private investigators, supervisory hunters and similar persons) - permissive may issue Taxi drivers - permissive or restrictive may issue depending on region)	10 (SACF); 20 (P)	Weapons made before 1871 and most black powder weapons	2
Azerbaijan	Not for shotguns Required for rifles Membership in hunting organization for at least five years required for rifles	No	Yes – under license	No	No	No		No		No	
Bahrain (Note: Bahrain: Firearms, Weapons and Ammunition Law, 1976 (in Arabic))	At discretion of authorities		Yes – may issue	Yes – may issue	Yes – may issue	No	No	No		No	15
Bangladesh	None except self-defense accepted	Justification required – restricted	Up to one	Up to one	No	No	No	Restricted		No	
Barbados (Note: Barbados: Firearms Act, 1998)	Yes – unspecified		Yes – may issue	Yes – may issue	Yes – may issue	Yes – may issue	Yes – may issue	Yes – may issue		No	5
Bahamas (Note: Bahamas: Firearms Act, 2001)	Yes – unspecified		Yes – may issue	Yes – may issue	Yes – under license	May issue – restricted	Maybe	Yes – may issue		No	7
Belarus (Note: Belaurs: Law on Weapons (in Russian))	Yes – hunting and sport shooting	No	Yes – under license	No	Yes – under license	No	No	No	10 (S,R)		
Belgium (EU) (Note: Belgium: Law on Weapons, 2006 (in Dutch))	Yes – collection, hunting, sport shooting	Justification required	Yes – shall issue	Yes – shall issue	Yes – shall issue	Yes – may issue		May issue – restricted	20 (P); 10 (R,S)	No	
Belize (Note: Belize: Firearms Act, 2000)	Yes – unspecified		Yes – may issue			No	Maybe	Yes – may issue		No	
Benin (Note: Benin: Law on Firearms (in French). – Article 18)	High social standing required		Restricted	Restricted	Restricted	No	No	No		No	
Bhutan (Note: Bhutan: Firearms and Ammunition Act, 1990)	Yes		May issue – restricted							No	
Bolivia (Note: Bolivia: Law on Control of firearms, ammunition, explosives and other related materials, 2013 (in Spanish))	Yes – hunting and sport shooting (membership in organization required)	Rarely issued	Yes – under license	Yes – under license	Yes – under license	No		Self-defense permits	None	No	
Bosnia and Herzegovina		Yes – may issue	Yes – may issue	Yes – may issue			Yes – may issue	Yes – may issue		No	
Botswana (Note: Botswana: Arms and Ammunition Act)	Yes – unspecified		May issue – no issue in practice (Note: 0.7% of firearms applications accepted)	No (moratorium since 1990) (Note: No new licenses are issued but licenses issued before ban are still valid)	May issue – no issue in practice	No	No	No		No	10
Brazil	Yes – sport shooting, collecting, hunting	Proof of threat to life required	Yes – shall issue		Yes – shall issue	No	No	May issue – restricted	No	No	3 years; 6 for restricted weapons
Brunei	Total ban	No	No	No	No	No	No	No	—N/a	No	
Bulgaria (EU) (Note: Bulgaria: Law on Weapons, 2010 (in Bulgarian).)	Yes Acceptable reasons are self-defense, hunting, sport shooting and "self-protection" (e.g. of business properties)	Justification required In theory, the law seems to hint at "simple declaration of reason". In practice, the local police chief has the final say and may reject your request regardless of your reasoning. The rejection can be appealed in court.	Yes – may issue Forbidden for self-defense. Allowed and usually granted for hunting and sport shooting.	Yes – may issue Allowed for self-defense. Allowed and usually granted for hunting and sport shooting. Also includes SBRs.	Yes – may issue Forbidden for self-defense. Allowed and usually granted for hunting and sport shooting.	No		Yes - may issue	20 (P); 10 (R,S)	No	
Burkina Faso	No new licenses since February 2020	No	No	No	No	No	No	No	—N/a	No	
Burundi	Yes – sport shooting, hunting	Proof of threat to life required	Yes – may issue			No	Maybe	Proof of threat to life required		No	10
Cambodia	Total ban	No	No	No	No	No	No	No	—N/a	No	2
Cameroon	At discretion of authorities		Yes – may issue. Sale banned in Ambazonia regions.			No	Yes – may issue	Yes – may issue		No	
Canada (Note: Canada: Firearms Act, 1995)	Not for non-restricted firearms Required for restricted firearms Target shooting or collector required for restricted	May issue – restricted	Yes – shall issue (Note: 99.7% of firearm license applications granted)	No pre-2022 owners grandfathered	Yes – Most models are restricted or prohibited	No pre-1978 owners grandfathered	Non-Restricted in rural public land only Restricted otherwise may issue – Restricted (Note: Storage, Display, Transportation and Handling of Firearms by Individuals Regulations § 10)	May issue – Highly Restricted	10 (P); 5 (SACFR); No (other)	non-restricted only	10
Cape Verde	Yes – unspecified	Yes – may issue	Yes – may issue	Yes – may issue	Yes – may issue	No	No	Yes – may issue		No	
Central African Republic	Only members of parliament (de jure)		Officially prohibited for civilians (widely unenforced)								
Chad	At discretion of authorities		Rarely issued	Rarely issued	Rarely issued	No					5
Chile	Yes – hunting, sport shooting, collecting (for more than two firearms)	Yes (up to two)	Yes – may issue	Yes – may issue		No	May issue – restricted	May issue – restricted	None (self defense licenses) (Note: limited to 100 rounds of each registered firearm. Hunting and sports licenses limited to 2000 rounds, 3000 for those with a transport license for each registered firearm. All ammunition sales must be registered.)	No	10
China (excl. Hong Kong and Macau)	Hunting – restricted	No	May issue – restricted	No	No	No	No	No	—N/a	No	7
Colombia (Note: Colombia: DECRETO 2535, 1993 (in Spanish))	Yes – sport shooting and collecting	Justification required (interpretation varies by region)	Yes – may issue	Yes – may issue		May issue – restricted	Moratorium in place with narrow exceptions	Moratorium in place with narrow exceptions		No	
Comoros	Total ban	No	No	No	No	No	No	No	—N/a	No	
Costa Rica (Note: Costa Rica: Weapons and Explosives Law)	Yes – sport shooting, collection, hunting (for more than 3 firearms)	Yes – shall issue (up to 3)	Yes – shall issue	Yes – shall issue	Yes – shall issue	No	No	Yes – shall issue	None (RF); Yes (CF)	No	
Croatia (EU) (Note: Croatia: "Law on Procurement and Possession of Weapons by Citizens". zakon.hr (in Croatian). 2020. Archived from the original on 6 December 2023.)	Yes – hunting and sport shooting	Proof of threat to life required	Yes – shall issue (Note: Around 93% of firearm license applications granted)		Yes – shall issue	No	No	Yes – may issue	20 (P); 10 (R,S)	No	60 days
Cuba (Note: Cuba: Law on Arms and Ammunition, 2008 (in Spanish))	Yes – hunting, sport shooting and collecting	Restricted	Yes – under license	Yes – under license	Yes – under license	No	No	Restricted		No	
Cyprus (EU) (Note: Cyprus: Law on Firearms and Other Weapons, 2004 (in Greek))	No	Yes – shotguns only	Yes – shotguns only (Note: Due to reserve military, many people have G3A3/G3A4.)	No	No	No	May issue – restricted	No	10 (S)	No	
Czech Republic (EU) (Note: Czech Republic: Act No. 119/2002 Coll., on Firearms and Ammunition, 2001 (in Czech))	Simple declaration of reason	Yes – shall issue	Yes – shall issue Permitless for category C-I and D firearms			May issue – restricted (Note: Subject to may issue police permit ("exemption") – private citizens only for collecting purposes, rarely issued)	Specific circumstances only General public: Allowed within context of activity that includes shooting or similar handling of firearms and when commonly considered appropriate, e.g. hunting, reenactment, biathlon, etc. Service purposes: Municipal Police and Czech National Bank Security while on-duty (unlike State Police, these are considered civilians)	Yes – shall issue Permitless for category C-I and D firearms	Shall issue exemption, Only for SACF: 10 (LG); 20 (P) (Note: Otherwise forbidden magazines with higher capacity are subject to shall issue police permit ("exemption") – for variety of reasons incl. self defense, sport, etc.)	Weapons made before 1890 (Note: All "Category D" weapons as defined by Act No. 119/2002 Coll. are not registered)	2 (8 in special cases) (Note: Special cases specified by penal code, include committing the crime of illicit firearm possession as part of organized group, in "large extent" (many firearms) or during state of war or other emergency)
DR Congo	Yes – hunting and sport shooting	Yes – may issue	Yes – may issue	Yes – may issue	Yes – may issue	No	Yes – may issue	Yes – may issue		No	10
Congo (Note: Congo: Ordinance No. 62/24, 1962 (in French))	Yes – hunting	Yes – may issue	Yes – may issue	Yes – may issue (up to one)	Yes – may issue	No	Restricted	Restricted		Yes	5
Denmark (EU) (excl. Greenland and Faroe Islands)	Yes – hunting and sport shooting	No	Yes – may issue	Yes		No	No	No	20 (P); 2 (SAR - No restriction for sporting rifles or rimfire cartridges); No (Other)	Only shotguns pre 2001	1 (minimum)
Djibouti	May issue – restricted		May issue – restricted								
Dominica (Note: Dominica: Firearms Act, 2011)	Yes – unspecified		Yes – may issue		Yes – may issue	No	Maybe	Yes – may issue		No	
Dominican Republic	New licenses rarely issued as a result of import ban		Shotguns only	Yes – under license	No	No	Yes – may issue	Yes – may issue		No	
Ecuador	Yes – hunting, sport shooting, collection	Yes (one handgun)	Yes (up to two firearms in total)			No	No	Restricted		No	
Egypt	Yes – unspecified		Yes – may issue				Maybe	Yes – may issue		No	up to life imprisonment
El Salvador		Yes – shall issue	Yes – shall issue	Yes – shall issue		No		Yes – shall issue		No	5
Eritrea	Total ban	No	No	No	No	No	No	No	—N/a	No	
Ethiopia (Note: Ethiopia: "Firearm Administration and Control Proclamation" (PDF). 2020. Archived (PDF) from the original on 17 January 2024.)	Yes – unspecified		Shotguns only	Yes – may issue	No	No	No	Yes – may issue		No	
Estonia (EU) (Note: Estonia: "Weapons Act". Riigiteataja.ee. Archived from the original on 4 December 2023. (in Estonian))	Yes – hunting, target shooting, collecting	Yes – shall issue	Yes – shall issue	Yes – shall issue	Yes – shall issue	Shall issue – members of Defence League off duty	No	Yes – shall issue (no bullet in chamber – except revolvers)	20 (P); 10 (R,S)	No	3
Equatorial Guinea	Yes – hunting		Shotguns only	No	No	No		No		No	
Fiji	All licenses suspended in 2000	No	No	No	No	No	No	No	—N/a	No	2–10
Finland (EU) (Note: Finland: Weapons Act, 1998)	Yes – hunting, sport shooting, collecting	No	Shall issue in practice (Note: 98% of firearm license applications granted)	Yes	Yes	May issue – restricted (Note: Special permit required, for collection, museum display, filming or other specified reason at discretion of authorities (section 44.))	No	No	RF & S: None; SACF: 20 (P), 10 (R); Exemptions: see tooltip. (Note: Gun licences that allow unrestricted magazines may (practically shall) be issued for sports shooters, reservists participating in voluntary national defence training etc.)	No	2
France (EU)	Yes – hunting and sport shooting	May issue – restricted	Yes – shall issue	Yes	Yes	No	No	May issue – restricted	20 (P); 30 (R)	No	7
Gabon (Note: Gabon: Decree no 00186/PR, 2017)		Yes – justification required	Rarely issued	Rarely issued				Rarely issued			
Gambia (Note: Gambia: "Arms and Ammunition Act, Gambia" (PDF). 1990. Archived from the original (PDF) on 10 November 2020.)	Yes – unspecified		Yes – may issue	Restricted	Restricted	No	Maybe	Yes – may issue		No	10
Georgia (country)	Yes – hunting and sport shooting	Yes (handguns only)	Yes – shall issue	Yes – shall issue	Yes – shall issue	No				No	
Germany (EU) (Note: Germany: Waffengesetz, 2002 (in German))	Yes – sport shooting, hunting, collecting (Note: While law does not specify "good reason" those are accepted in practice)	Proof of threat to life required – rarely granted	Yes – shall issue	Yes – shall issue	Yes – shall issue	No	Proof of threat to life required – Near no issue in practice	Proof of threat to life required – Near no issue in practice	20 (SACFP); 10 (SACFR, SACFS)	No	10
Ghana	Yes – hunting	Yes – shall issue	Yes – shotguns only	Yes – shall issue	No	No	No	Yes	No	No	
Greece (EU)	Yes – hunting and sport shooting	Proof of threat to life required	Yes	Yes		No	Yes	Yes	No	No	
Grenada (Note: Grenada: Firearms Act, 1968)	Yes – unspecified		Yes – may issue	Yes – may issue	Yes – may issue	No	Maybe	Yes – may issue		No	5
Guinea	Yes – hunting	Restricted	Restricted	Restricted	No	No	Long guns (all legal owners)	No	No	Yes (plans to establish registry)	
Guinea-Bissau	Total ban	No	No	No	No	No	No	No	—N/a	No	
Guyana (Note: Arms and Ammunition Act 7, 1996)	Yes – unspecified		Yes – may issue	Yes – may issue	Yes – may issue	May issue – restricted	Maybe	Yes – may issue		No	10
Guatemala (Note: Guatemala: Law on Arms and Ammunition, 2009 (in Spanish))	Not for possession	Yes – government approval required	Yes – shall issue	Yes	Yes – shall issue	No	No	Yes (with self-defense permit)		No	15
Haiti	Rarely issued since 2003		Restricted	Restricted	Restricted	No	No	Restricted		Yes	5
Honduras	No	Yes	Yes – shall issue	Yes	Yes – up to .303 caliber	No	No	No		No	10
Hungary (EU)	Yes – hunting, sport shooting, collecting	May issue – restricted	Yes – under license	Yes – under license		No	Professionals only	May issue – restricted	20 (P); 10 (R,S)	No	8
Iceland	Yes – hunting	No	Yes – may issue	Yes		May issue if related to the history of Iceland e.g. WW2	No	No		No	4
India (Note: India: Arms Act, 1959)	Yes – unspecified		Yes – may issue (Note: Around 50% of firearm license applications granted)	Yes – may issue	With Prohibited-bore license	No	No	Yes – may issue	Yes	No	up to life imprisonment
Indonesia	No	May issue – restricted	May issue – restricted	May issue – restricted		No		May issue – restricted		No	20 or death
Iraq	No	Yes – shall issue	Yes – shall issue		Yes – shall issue	Yes	Yes – shall issue	Yes – shall issue		No	
Iran	No	May issue – restricted	May issue – restricted				Maybe	May issue – restricted		No	
Ireland (EU) (Note: Ireland: Firearms Act, 1925)	Yes – hunting, sports shooting or pest control	Proof of threat to life required – rarely granted	Yes – may issue	.22lr and .177 only	rimfire - unrestricted, centrefire - restricted	No	No	No	Yes	No	7
Israel	Yes – hunting and sport shooting	May issue – specific reason needed	Yes – may issue (Note: Around 60% of firearm license applications granted)	May issue		No	May issue – specific reason needed	May issue – specific reason needed		No	10
Italy (EU)	Simple declaration of reason (possession only)	Yes (home defense)	Yes – shall issue	Yes (up to three)	Yes	No	No	Proof of threat to life required – rarely granted	20 (P); 10 (R,S)	No	1
Jamaica (Note: Jamaica: Firearms Act, 1967)	Yes – unspecified		Yes – may issue (Note: 89% of firearm license applications granted (2011–2013))	Yes – may issue		No	Maybe	Yes – may issue		No	
Ivory Coast (Note: Ivory Coast: Regulation of Weapons and Ammunition, 1999 (in French))	Yes – hunting and sport shooting (justification required)	Yes – justification required	Yes – may issue		Yes – may issue	No	No	Yes – justification required		No	
Japan	Yes – hunting or sport shooting	No	May issue – restricted	No	No	No	No	No		No	15
Jordan (Note: Jordan: Firearms and Ammunition Act, 1952 (in Arabic))	No	Yes – home defense	Yes – shall issue	Yes – shall issue	Yes – shall issue	With special permit	With special permit	With special permit			
Kazakhstan	Not for shotguns Rifles Three years of shotgun ownership and hunting license required	Yes (shotguns only)	Yes (up to four)	No	Yes – under license	No	Maybe	No		No	5
Kenya (Note: Kenya: Firearms Act, 2015)	Yes – unspecified		Yes – may issue	Yes – may issue	Yes, with exceptions Exceptions Military rifles and specifically 7.62 mm, 5.56 mm calibers are prohibited	No	No	Automatic in case of legal possession		No	15
Kiribati	Prohibited in practice	No	No	No	No	No	Maybe	No	—N/a	No	2–10
Kuwait		May issue – restricted	Yes – may issue	Restricted		No				No	
Kyrgyzstan (Note: Kyrgyzstan: Law on Weapons, 1991 (in Kyrgyz))	Not for shotguns Rifles Five years of shotgun ownership required	Yes (shotguns only)	Yes (up to four)	No	Yes – under license	No	No	No	10 (S,R)	No	
Laos	High social standing required		Restricted	Restricted	Restricted		No	No		No	10
Latvia (EU) (Note: Latvia: Law on The Handling of Weapons, 2002 (outdated, as of 2019))	Yes – hunting, sport shooting, collecting	Yes – shall issue (handguns and shotguns)	Yes – shall issue	Yes – shall issue	Yes – shall issue	No	No	Yes – shall issue	20 (P); 10 (R,S)	No	
Lebanon			May issue – restricted			No					
Lesotho (Note: Lesotho: Arms and Ammunition Act, 1996)	Yes – unspecified		Yes – shotguns only	Yes – revolvers only	No	No	Maybe			No	
Liberia (Note: Liberia: Firearms and Ammunition Control Act, 2015)	Yes – hunting	No	Single-shot shotguns	No	No	No	Maybe	No	—N/a	No	
Libya (Note: Libya: Law on arms, ammunition and explosives law, 1967)	At discretion of authorities		Yes – may issue	Yes – may issue	Yes – may issue	No	Yes – may issue	Yes – may issue	None		
Lithuania (EU) (Note: Lithuania: Law on the control of arms and ammunition, 2002)	Yes – hunting, sport shooting, collecting	Yes – shall issue (handguns and shotguns)	Yes – shall issue	Yes – shall issue	Yes – shall issue	Depends General Public: No. Privately owned firearms of members of Lithuanian Armed Forces, Lithuanian National Defence Volunteer Forces, Lithuanian Riflemen's Union: Yes.	No	Yes – shall issue (no bullet in chamber – except revolvers)	20 (P); 10 (R,S)	No	5
Luxembourg (EU)	Yes – hunting, sport shooting, collecting (membership in organization required)	No	Yes – under license			No	No	No	20 (P); 10 (R,S)	No	
Madagascar	At discretion of authorities	Yes – may issue	Yes – may issue								
Malawi (Note: Malawi: Firearms Act, 1997)	Yes – unspecified		Yes – may issue		Yes – may issue	No	Maybe	Yes – may issue		No	14
Malaysia (Note: Malaysia: Arms Act, 1960)	Yes – unspecified		May issue – restricted			No	May issue – restricted	May issue – restricted		No	14
Maldives	Total ban	No	No	No	No	No	No	No	—N/a	No	
Mali	All licenses suspended in 2018	No	No	No	No	No	No	No		No	
Malta (EU) (Note: Malta: Arms Act, 2005)	Yes – target shooting or collecting (membership in organization required)	No	Yes – shall issue	Yes	Yes – shall issue	Yes – pre–1946 only (Note: However they cannot be discharged, even at shooting ranges)	No	No	20 (P); 10 (R,S)	No	
Marshall Islands	Total ban	No	No	No	No	No	No	No	—N/a	No	5
Mauritania		Yes – may issue	Yes – may issue		Yes – may issue	No	Maybe	Yes – may issue		No	15
Mauritius (Note: Mauritius: Firearms Act, 2007)	Yes – unspecified		Yes – may issue			No	Maybe	Yes – may issue	No		
Mexico	Yes – sport shooting, collecting, hunting (membership in organization required)	Yes – home defense (one handgun)	Yes (up to nine)	Yes (up to one)		No	May issue – restricted	May issue – restricted		No	7
Micronesia	Yes – hunting and fishing	No	.410 shotguns and .22 LR rifles	No		No	Maybe	No		No	5
Moldova (Note: Moldova: On the regime of firearms and ammunition for civilian use, 2012)	Yes – hunting and sport shooting	Yes (handguns)	Yes – shall issue	Yes – shall issue	Yes – shall issue	No	No	No		No	
Monaco	Not for repeating long guns (Membership in Monaco Rifle Club required for other firearms)	No	Rimfire: permitless, centerfire: shall-issue	Yes – shall issue	Yes – shall issue	No	Yes	Yes	Yes	Hunting guns	
Montenegro (Note: Montenegro: Law on Weapons)	Yes – hunting and sport shooting	Yes – may issue	Yes – shall issue		Restricted	No	Yes – may issue	Yes – may issue		No	
Mongolia	Yes – hunting, sports, collection	Yes – may issue	Yes – may issue		Yes – may issue	Yes – may issue	Maybe	Yes – may issue		No	
Morocco	Yes – hunting (membership in organization required)	Restricted	Shotguns under license, rifles usually not allowed	Restricted	Restricted	No		Restricted			
Mozambique	Farming, hunting, high social standing (at discretion of authorities)	May issue – restricted	May issue – restricted	May issue – restricted	May issue – restricted	No				No	
Myanmar	Yes - at discretion by state for law and order	No	Yes – may issue	Yes – may issue	Yes – may issue	Yes - may issue for civil servants and security personnel	Yes - based on permit conditions	Yes - based on permit conditions	—N/a	No	3
Namibia (Note: Namibia: Arms and Ammunition Act 7, 1997)	Yes – unspecified		Yes – may issue (Note: 83% of firearm license applications granted)		Yes – may issue	No	No	Yes – must be unloaded		No	25
Nauru	Total ban	No	No	No	No	No	No	No	—N/a	No	2–4
Nepal (Note: Nepal: Arms and Ammunition Act, 2019)	Yes – unspecified		Shotguns and muzzle-loading rifles	Rarely issued	No	No	Maybe	Yes – may issue		No	7
Netherlands (EU)	Yes – hunting and target shooting	No	Yes – may issue			No	No	No	20 (P); 10 (R,S)	No	1
New Zealand (Note: New Zealand: Arms Act, 1983)	Not for long guns	No	May issue – shall issue in practice (Note: 99.6% of firearm license applications granted)	Tightly regulated. Must be an active member of a pistol club.	Rimfire only	No	No	No	5 (S); 10 (RFR)	Registration of certain firearm types B and C category.	10
Nicaragua	No	Yes – shall issue	Yes – shall issue	Yes – shall issue	Yes – shall issue	No	No	Yes – shall issue		No	
Niger	Only traders in practice		Restricted	Restricted	Restricted	No	Restricted	Restricted		No	
Nigeria (Note: Nigeria: Firearms Act)	Yes – hunting and sport shooting	No	Only shotguns in practice	No	Not allowed in practice	No	Maybe	No		No	5
North Korea	Total ban	No	No	No	No	No	No	No	—N/a	No	20 or death
North Macedonia	Yes – hunting, collecting and sport shooting	Proof of threat to life required	Yes – shall issue	Yes		No	No	No		No	
Norway (Note: Norway:Lov om våpen, skytevåpen, våpendelar og ammunisjon, 2018)	Yes – hunting and sport shooting	May issue – restricted	Yes – shall issue (Note: 98.3% of firearm license application granted (2017))		Yes – hunting and sport shooting	May issue – restricted	No	No		No	3 months
Oman (Note: Oman: Weapons and Munitions Law)	At discretion of authorities		Yes – may issue	Yes – may issue	Yes – may issue	No	No	No	None	No	3
Pakistan (Note: Pakistan: "Issuance of Prohibited/Non-Prohibited Arms Policy". Archived from the original on 23 July 2023., 2012)	No	Yes – shall issue	Yes – shall issue	Yes – shall issue	With prohibited-bore license	With prohibited-bore license – restricted	No (Note: Public display of weapons banned in 2000, ban mostly not enforced)	Yes – shall issue	None	No	7
Palau	Total ban	No	No	No	No	No	No	No	—N/a	No	15
Papua New Guinea	No new licenses since 2017	No	No	No	No	No	No	No	—N/a	No	6 months
Panama	No	Yes – shall issue	Yes – shall issue	Yes – shall issue	Yes – shall issue	No	No	Yes – shall issue		No	
Paraguay (Note: Paraguay: Act No. 4,036 on Firearms, their Parts and Components, Ammunition, Explosives, Accessories and Similar Items, 2010 (in Spanish))	Yes – collecting and sport shooting	Yes – home defense	Yes – shall issue			No		Rarely issued		No	
Peru	Yes – hunting and sport shooting (membership in organization required)	Justification required	Yes – under license	Yes – under license	Yes – under license	No	Yes	Justification required		No	
Philippines (Note: Philippines: Republic Act No. 10591, 2013)	Yes – hunting and sport shooting	Yes – may issue	Yes – may issue		Yes – may issue	No	Yes – may issue	Yes – may issue	50/Firearm; 500-1000/Firearm for Sport Shooters	No	8
Poland (EU) (Note: Poland: Weapons and Munitions Act, 1996 (in Polish))	Yes – hunting, collection and sport shooting (membership in organization required)	Proof of threat to life required – rarely granted	Yes - shall issue			May issue – restricted (Note: Training purpose and institutional permits. Blank-firing automatic firearms may be obtained for historical reenactment purpose.)	No – professionals only	Depends True CCW licenses based on Firearms Act: Restricted May issue De facto CCW based on Ministerial Decree: Shall issue for sport shooting license holders Permitless: Permitless for cartridgeless black powder guns designed before 1885	None	Cartridgeless black powder guns designed before 1885	8
Portugal (EU) (Note: Portugal: Lei n.º 50/2019, 2019 (in Portuguese))	Yes – hunting, collecting and sport shooting (justification required)	Justification required	Yes – may issue		Yes – may issue	May issue – restricted (Note: Automatic firearms may be obtained by collectors.)	No	May issue – restricted	20 (CFP); 10 (R,S) (Note: Rifle magazines with a capacity of over 10 cartridges and Pistol magazines with a capacity of over 20 cartridges may be acquired by sport shooters.)	No	
Qatar	Yes – hunting	Proof of threat to life required	Shotguns and air rifles only	Restricted	Restricted	No	No	No			
Romania (EU)	Yes – hunting, collection and sport shooting	May issue – restricted	Yes – may issue	No		No	No – professionals only	May issue – restricted	10 (R,S)	No	3 months - 7 years
Russia	Not for shotguns Rifles Five years of shotgun ownership required	Yes (shotguns only)	Yes – shall issue (Note: 93% of firearm applications granted)	Restricted	Yes – shall issue	No	No	Rarely – restricted for real firearms	10 (S,R)	No	8
Rwanda	Yes – unspecified		Yes – may issue	Yes – may issue	Yes – may issue	No	Maybe	Yes – may issue		No	
Saint Kitts and Nevis (Note: Saint Kitts and Nevis: Firearms Act, 2002)	Yes – unspecified		Yes – may issue		Yes – may issue	No	Maybe	Yes – may issue		No	
Saint Lucia (Note: Saint Lucia: Firearms Act, 2003)	Yes – sport shooting and collecting (justification required)	Yes – may issue	Yes – may issue	Yes – may issue	Yes – may issue	No	No	Yes – may issue		No	10
St Vincent & Grenadines (Note: Saint Vincent and Grenadines: Firearms Act, 1995)	Yes – unspecified		Yes – may issue	Yes – may issue	Yes – may issue	No	Maybe	Yes – may issue		No	20
Samoa (Note: Samoa: Arms Ordinance, 1960)	Yes – shall issue	no	Yes – shall issue shotguns & .22 rifles. Other power rifles may issue on request.	No	Yes – shall issue	No	No	No	None	No	5
San Marino (Note: San Marino: ACT IN THE MATTER OF WEAPONS AND EXPLOSIVES, 2012)	Yes – hunting and sport shooting	No	Yes – shall issue	Yes – shall issue	Yes – shall issue	No				No	
São Tomé and Príncipe (Note: São Tomé and Príncipe: Law on Hunting (in Portuguese), Article 22 "Permitted weapons")	Yes – hunting	No	Yes – under license	No	Yes – under license	No		No			
Saudi Arabia (Note: Saudi Arabia: Weapons and Ammunition System (in Arabic))	At discretion of authorities (Note: Law does not require good reason for firearm license but it gives authorities power to reject applications at their will)		Yes – may issue	Yes – may issue	Yes – may issue	No					2
Senegal	At discretion of authorities		Yes – may issue	Yes – may issue						No	
Seychelles	All licenses suspended in 1977		No	No	No	No	No	No	—N/a	No	
Serbia (Note: Serbia: "Decree n Proclamation of the Law on Weapons and Ammunition" (PDF). Archived (PDF) from the original on 14 December 2023., 2015)	Yes – hunting and sport shooting	Proof of threat to life required	Yes – shall issue	Yes – under license	Yes – shall issue	No	No – professionals only	Proof of threat to life required – rarely granted	None	No	5
Sierra Leone (Note: Sierra Leone: The Arms and Ammunition Act, 2007)	Yes – unspecified		Yes – may issue		Yes – may issue	No	Maybe	Yes – may issue		No	
Singapore	Yes – target shooting (membership in club required)	Proof of threat to life required – rarely granted	May issue – restricted		May issue – restricted	May issue – restricted	May issue – restricted	May issue – restricted		No	14
Slovakia (EU)	Yes – hunting, sport shooting, collection (membership in organization required)	Permissive may issue (Note: Handguns only)	Yes – shall issue	Yes – shall issue		May issue - restricted	No	Permissive or restrictive may issue depending on region (genuine reason needed)	20 (P); 10 (R,S) permissive may issue exception for oversize magazines	No	
Slovenia (EU)	Yes – hunting, sport shooting, collecting	Proof of threat to life required	Yes – may issue			No		May issue – restricted	Yes	No	
Solomon Islands	Total ban	No	No (moratorium in place)		No	No	No	No	—N/a	No	
Somalia	Total ban (de jure)		No, but widely unenforced						—N/a		
South Africa		Yes – may issue	Yes – may issue (Note: Around 50% of firearm license applications granted (2011).)		Yes – may issue	May issue – restricted	No	Automatic in case of legal possession	None	No	15
South Korea	Yes – hunting and sport shooting	No	Yes – may issue	No	Restricted	No	No	No		No	3-15 years
South Sudan (Note: South Sudan: Penal Code, 2008. Section 72: Possession of Dangerous Weapons)	No		Permitless (Note: South Sudan's penal code only prohibits possession of fully and semi-automatic firearms (except handguns). No penalties are provided for other types of firearms. In 2016 draft law was enacted that would regulated possession of any kind of firearms. As of November 2020 it has not been passed by the parliament. ())	Permitless	No	No	No	Unregulated	None		10
Spain (EU)	Yes – hunting and sport shooting	May issue – restricted	Yes – May issue		Yes	No	No	May issue – restricted	3 (SAS); 2–4 (SACFR); None (RFR)	No	
Sri Lanka	Yes – crop protection and sport shooting	Rarely issued	Yes – may issue	Yes – may issue	Yes – may issue					No	25
Sudan	High social standing or income required		Restricted (Note: People eligible for shotgun license include employees with salary higher than 400,000 pounds a year, dealers who paid more than 500,000 pounds in taxes and farmers who paid more than 200,000 pounds in taxes over three years)	Restricted	Restricted	Restricted	Restricted	Restricted	None	No	5
Suriname (Note: Suriname: Firearms Bill, 1930)	Yes – unspecified		Yes – mostly shotguns	Restricted	Restricted	No	No	No		No	
Switzerland (Note: Switzerland: Weapons Act, 1997 (in German)) (including Liechtenstein)	Not required to buy a gun unless the reason is other than sport-shooting, hunting, or collecting	Personal protection is not a shall-issue reason	Unregulated Firearms that were manufactured before 1870; Firearms that cannot be carried and operated by a single person Permitless Single-shot and bolt-action rifles, single-shot rabbit slayers Shall-issue Lever and pump-action rifles, self-loading shotguns	Yes – shall issue	Yes – shall issue	May Issue	May issue – under license, with exceptions authorized during transport if unloaded	May issue – under license, with exceptions authorized during transport if unloaded	20+ (P); 10+ (SACF) (Note: Limit for standard shall-issue permit. No limit for shall-issue permit for sport shooters and may-issue exceptional permit)	No - registration of new purchases is mandatory since 2008	3
Swaziland		Yes – may issue	Yes – may issue (Note: Around 57% of firearm license applications granted)			No	Maybe			No	
Sweden (EU) (Note: Sweden: Arms Act, 1997 (in Swedish))	Yes – sport shooting, hunting	Proof of threat to life required – rarely granted	Yes – under license	Yes – under license	Yes – under license	K-pist (restricted to some sport shooters (Note: Golden badge in sport shooting organization for at least three years required : source. Golden badge requires outstanding accomplishments in sport shooting competitions: source))	No	Proof of threat to life required – No issue in practice	None	No	
Syria	At discretion of authorities	Yes – may issue	Two shotguns	One revolver	No	No				No	5–6
Taiwan		May issue - restricted	May issue - restricted	May issue – restricted		No	No	No	No	No	
Tajikistan (Note: Tajikistan: Law on Weapons, 2013 (in Tajik))	Not for shotguns Rifles Five years of shotgun ownership required	Yes (shotguns only)	Yes (up to four)	No	Yes – under license	No	No	No	10 (S,R)	No	
Tanzania (Note: Tanzania: The Firearms and Ammunition Control Act, 2015)	At discretion of authorities		Yes – may issue	Yes – may issue	No	No	Maybe	Yes – may issue		No	
Thailand (Note: Thailand: FIREARMS, AMMUNITION, EXPLOSIVES, FIREWORKS AND IMITATION FIREARMS ACT, 1947)	Yes – hunting and sport shooting	Yes – may issue	Yes – may issue		Yes – may issue	No	No	Yes – may issue		No	10
Timor-Leste	Total ban	No	No	No	No	No	No	No	—N/a	No	1
Togo	Yes – hunting	No	12 gauge shotguns only	No	No	No		No		No	
Tonga (Note: Tonga: Arms and Ammunition Act)	Yes – hunting, farming, fishing	No	Yes – under license	No	No	No	Unloaded shotguns only	No		No	5
Trinidad and Tobago (Note: Trinidad and Tobago: Firearms Act, 2016)	Yes – unspecified		Yes – may issue		Yes – may issue	No	Maybe	Yes – may issue		No	
Tunisia	Hunting – restricted	No	Shotguns only – may issue	No	No	No					
Turkey	Only for carrying rifles or handguns	Yes – may issue	Yes – shall issue	Yes – shall issue	No carry permit – rare	Only for high-value asset security	Maybe	May issue – restricted	None	No	3–8
Turkmenistan	Yes – hunting	No	Yes – shotguns only	No	No	No		No		No	
Tuvalu	Yes – shooting birds	No	May issue – restricted	No		No		No		No	2–10
Uganda (Note: Uganda: Firearms Act, 1970)	High social standing required		Rarely issued	Rarely issued	Rarely issued	Public officials only	No	Rarely issued		No	10
Ukraine	Yes – sport shooting, collecting, hunting	No	Yes – may issue	Restricted (Note: Allowed recently)	Yes – may issue	No	May issue – restricted	No (Note: Issued only to Members of Parliament, judges and state attorneys)		No	7
United Arab Emirates (Note: United Arab Emirates: Federal Law No. 3 on Weapons, Ammunition and Explosives, 2009)	Yes – hunting and sport shooting	Yes – may issue	Yes – may issue				No				
United Kingdom - England, Wales, Scotland (Note: United Kingdom: Firearms Act, 1997)	Not for shotguns Unspecified for rifles	No	May issue – shall issue in practice (Note: 98% of firearm and 97% of shotgun applications granted)	No	Any .22 rimfire cartridge, most commonly .22 LR but also .22 WMR	No	Unloaded shotguns only – dissuaded in practice	No	2+ (S) (Note: Shall issue section 2 shotguns, which are limited to 3 rounds (2+1). Shotguns that fall under may issue section 1 are not limited); None (R)	No	5–10 (Note: 5 years minimum and up to 10 years maximum for section 5 prohibited firearms. No minimum and up to 5 years maximum for any other non-prohibited but unlicensed firearms)
United Kingdom - Northern Ireland (Note: Northern Ireland: THE FIREARMS (NORTHERN IRELAND) ORDER 2004)	Not for shotguns Unspecified for rifles	May issue - restricted	May issue	May issue	Any .22 rimfire cartridge, most commonly .22 LR but also .22 WMR	No		May issue - restricted		No	
United States	Possession of firearms at home and in public constitutionally protected (see DC v. Heller)		Permitless in most states Varies Four states: Shall-issue permit 17 states: Background check for all sales	Permitless in most states Varies Eight states: Shall-issue permit 23 states: Background check for all sales	Permitless in most states Restrictions in some states	Pre-1986 only	Varies Permitless: 32 states Shall issue: 12 states May issue: 1 state Anomalous: 1 state Illegal: 4 states	Permitless or shall-issue in all states (NYSRPA v. Bruen)	Varies internally	Varies internally	Federal: 10 years, State: Varies
Uruguay (Note: Uruguay: Decreto N° 377/016, 2014 (in Spanish))	Justification required for more than 3 guns	Yes (up to 3)	Yes – shall issue		Yes – shall issue	No	No	Yes – may issue		No	12
Uzbekistan	Yes – hunting and sport shooting	No	Yes – under license	No		No	No	No	10	No	
Vanuatu	Yes – farming	No	Yes – may issue	No	No	No	No	No	—N/a	No	6 months
Vatican City	Total ban	No	No	No	No	No	No	No	—N/a	No	
Venezuela	No	No	May issue – restricted	May issue – restricted	No	No	No	No		No	20
Vietnam (Note: Vietnam: Law on management and use of weapons, explosives and combat gears (in Vietnamese))	Yes – unspecified	No	May issue – restricted	No	May issue – restricted	No	No	No		No	7
Yemen	No	Yes	Permitless		Permitless	Permitless	Yes – may issue. Unrestricted in rural areas	Yes – may issue. Unrestricted in rural areas	None	Yes	1
Zambia (Note: Zambia: Firearms Act)	At discretion of authorities		Yes – may issue	Yes – may issue	Yes – may issue	No	Maybe	Yes – under license		No	15
Zimbabwe (Note: Zimbabwe: Firearms Act, 1957)	Yes – unspecified		Yes – may issue		Yes – may issue	May issue – restricted	Maybe	Yes – may issue		No	5
Individual jurisdictions
Cayman Islands	Yes – unspecified		Yes – may issue		No	No				No	
Cook Islands	No new licenses since 1992	No	No	No	No	No	No	No	—N/a	No	
Gaza Strip (Note: De jure part of Palestinian Authority, de facto self-governing territory under control of Hamas. While Palestinian law prohibits possession of firearms without license it has not been implemented in Gaza Strip.)	No	Yes	Permitless		Permitless	Permitless	No	unregulated	None	Yes	
Greenland (Note: Greenland: Act on control and registration of firearms in Greenland, 1992)	Not for long guns. Unspecified for other.	May issue	Permitless	Yes – under license	Yes – under license	Yes – under license	Permitless (long guns)	Yes – may issue	None	Long guns	None for long guns
Guam	No	Yes	Yes – shall issue	Yes	Yes – shall issue	No	Yes – shall issue	Yes – shall issue	None	No	
Hong Kong (Note: Hong Kong: Firearms and Ammunition Ordinance, 2019)	Yes – unspecified		Yes – under license			No	No	No	Yes	No	14
Idlib Governorate (rebel-held)	No	Yes	Permitless (Note: In October 2020 Idlib-held Syrian Salvation Government announced plan to start licensing firearms however no date has been provided for start of this and some other rebel groups rejected this decision)		Permitless	Permitless		Unregulated	None	Yes	
Kosovo		Yes – may issue	Yes – may issue							No	10
Northern Mariana Islands	No	Yes	Yes – shall issue		Yes	No	Automatic in case of legal possession	No	10	Yes (under court order)	
Puerto Rico (Note: Puerto Rico: Weapons Act, 2020)	No	Yes	Yes – shall issue		Yes – shall issue	No	No	Yes – shall issue	None	No	5
American Samoa	Yes – plantation protection and hunting	No	Shotguns and .22 LR rifles	No	.22 LR only	No	Yes (long guns only)	No	None	No	
Somaliland	Justification required for more than 1 gun of each type		May-issue	Yes (up to one)	Unspecified	One Kalashnikov rifle	No	No	None	No	
U.S. Virgin Islands	Yes – farming and sport shooting	Yes (handguns only)	Yes – under license	Yes – under license		No	No	Rarely issued	Yes	No	
West Bank			Yes – under license								3

== Africa ==
The Bamako Declaration on an African Common Position on the Illicit Proliferation, Circulation and Trafficking of Small Arms and Light Weapons was adopted in Bamako, Mali, on 1 December 2000 by the representatives of the 51 member states of the Organisation of African Unity (OAU). The provisions of this declaration recommend that the signatories establish the illegal possession of small arms and light weapons as a criminal offence under national law in their respective countries.

=== Botswana ===
Botswana's law allows possession of shotguns and rifles only. The government has put a limit on the number of licenses issued every year – only 50 people can receive them, no matter how many apply, meaning that the acceptance rate is usually below 1%.

Currently there are 34,550 (or 1.5 per 100 people) registered firearms.

=== Central African Republic ===
Officially only 143 people have a permit to own firearms in Central African Republic, mostly members of parliament. They are entitled to possess one 12-gauge shotgun and one 9mm automatic pistol. Regardless, illegal possession and carry of firearms is widespread in Central African Republic, large parts of which are under control of different armed groups. Anti-balaka and ex-Séléka militias possess and carry home-made shotguns, automatic rifles and rocket launchers.

=== Chad ===
A law on firearms passed in 1968 requires a permit to own a firearm in Chad which must be renewed annually. This law does not specify any conditions that must be met to obtain a license except for a tax stamp which must be paid, between 500 and 3000 CFA francs depending on the type of firearm. (Note: Chad: Ordinance No 26/PG-INT Regulating Import, Transport, Sale, and Possession of Firearms and Ammunition, 1968) Considering that in 2017 the Chadian government raised 5 million francs from issuing firearm licenses it would mean that there are between 1,666 and 10,000 active firearm licenses in Chad or between 0.01 and 0.06 per 100 people.

=== Djibouti ===
Possession of firearms in Djibouti is generally prohibited except when special permits are granted in exceptional circumstances by the Head of State.

=== Egypt ===
In Egypt, gun laws are strict. To possess a firearm, a license from the Ministry of the Interior is required. To obtain a license, Egyptian nationality, a minimum age of 21, and a good reputation (no felony or serious misdemeanor, no mental illness, literacy, etc.) are required. A firearm will be selected for the applicant based on needs. Carrying a firearm in a public place by a civilian is not allowed. Life imprisonment can be imposed for unlicensed possession and trafficking.

Allowed guns include revolvers, pistols, shotguns, and "sound/air/gas" pistols

=== Eritrea ===
Firearms in Eritrea are completely prohibited for civilian use without exceptions.

=== Eswatini ===
Permitted types of firearms in Eswatini are shotguns, revolvers, pistols and rifles. To obtain a license one must get approval from the Local Chief's council, Local Station Commander, Regional Administrator, Director of Crimes at Police Headquarters, Licensing Officer/Registrar of Firearms Registry, Licensing Board and lastly the Police Station Commander. Requirements include general standing in the community. The application acceptance rate is around 57% as of 2002.

=== Gambia ===
Current law states that firearm licenses are a privilege in Gambia and authorities have full discretion in issuing them.

=== Ghana ===
The firearms law in Ghana allows acquisition of shotguns and handguns (pistols and revolvers). It requires that every firearm must be reregistered every year; however, this is widely ignored. Out of 1,230,000 people who legally bought a gun only 40,000 are reregistering their weapons every year. Unlike other African countries, handguns are popular in Ghana. For example, in Greater Accra Region 74.4% of people who legally acquired guns in 2020 chose revolvers, while 21% chose shotguns. In the Ashanti region 45.5% chose shotguns, while 21.5% chose revolvers.

=== Kenya ===
Gun regulation in Kenya is established by the Firearms Act (Cap. 114) of Kenya. The Act states: "No person under the age of twelve years shall have in his possession any firearm or ammunition to which Part II applies, and no person under the age of fourteen years shall have in his possession any firearm or ammunition to which Part II applies other than a miniature rifle not exceeding 0.22 calibre or a shotgun the bore of which is not larger than 20 gauge, and ammunition suitable therefor, except in circumstances where he is entitled to have possession thereof without holding a firearm certificate by virtue of subsection (8), subsection (9) or subsection (10) of section 7; and no person shall part with the possession of any such firearm or ammunition to any person whom he knows or has reason to believe to be under the age of twelve or fourteen years, as the case may be, except in circumstances where that other person is entitled to have possession thereof."

The Chief Licensing Officer (CLO) has discretion to award, deny, or revoke firearm licenses. Applicants must be 21 years of age or older, pass a stringent background check for criminal activity, mental health and domestic violence, and state genuine reason(s) for their need to privately own and carry a firearm. Checks are regularly repeated, with failure to pass resulting in immediate revocation of the license. Once licensed to own a gun, no additional permit is required to carry a concealed firearm.

=== Lesotho ===
Applicants for firearm possession must obtain a reference letter from the village chief or headman and the Principal Chief. It is later sent to local police stations for scrutiny, then to district police for their assessment, then to the National Security Service or Criminal Intelligence for vetting of the applicant. The application then goes to the Regional Police Commissioner who will in turn pass it to the Police Headquarters for approval by the Commissioner of Police (Firearms and Explosives Licensing Board).

=== Liberia ===
Liberia allows only possession of single-shot shotguns and black powder long guns for hunting purposes. Private security agencies are banned from arming their employees. However, some criminals have automatic firearms, particularly AK-styled rifles. These are believed to be leftovers from the country's decade-long intermittent civil war. Automatic firearms are also likely coming across the country's porous borders with Guinea, Ivory Coast, and Sierra Leone. These countries have more liberal gun-ownership laws. All of Liberia's neighbors have experienced some form of armed conflict in the last two decades leaving them awash with illegal automatic weapons. The Emergency Response Unit (ERU), the only armed unit within the Liberia National Police, responds to armed incidents, particularly armed robbery.

Liberia Firearms and Ammunition Control Act of 2015 regulates the possession and use of small arms and light weapons in the country. The illegal possession of small arms and light weapons constitutes a first-degree misdemeanor and is punishable by a term of imprisonment of not more than a year and seizure of the illegally possessed arm or ammunition.

=== Mozambique ===
There are no licensed firearm dealers in Mozambique, therefore any person wanting to obtain one must travel to a different country (usually South Africa), purchase guns, then return, surrender them for authorities and ask them to allow them to obtain them.

=== Namibia ===
Namibia permits firearm ownership under license, which is issued on a may-issue basis. In 2017 Namibian police issued 7,647 firearm licenses from 9,239 applications, the acceptance rate therefore being around 83%. Overall there are currently 200,100 registered firearms in Namibia or 9 per 100 people. Most popular types of firearms owned by civilians are pistols (46%), rifles (34%) and shotguns (24%). Carrying unloaded concealed firearms in public is allowed.

=== Rwanda ===
In 2019 Rwanda passed a new law dealing with firearm possession. It states that authorities have total discretion when determining whether persons can own firearms and can therefore deny applications without reason, even if someone met all requirements.

=== Senegal ===
Senegal has a strict gun legislation. Applications for firearm licenses do not need to specify a reason. An application requires: copy of identity card, criminal record, medical check-up, four photos, tax stamp and personality test. Decisions should be made after a few months.

Gun ownership is very rare, however numbers are on the rise. In 2016 Senegal police issued 1000 licenses, while rejecting 250 (80% acceptance rate), compared to 456 in 2011. In 2017 it was estimated that police issued more than 7,000 total licenses (0.04 per 100 people).

=== Sierra Leone ===
In 2012, Sierra Leone legalized gun ownership after 16 years of a total ban being enforced. According to the act, authorities have discretion in determining whether persons have good reasons to own firearms. The Arms Act of 2021 repealed the Arms Act of 2012, with little change to licensing procedures.

=== Somalia ===
From 1992 until 2023, a UN embargo had prohibited importation of any firearms into Somalia except for security forces.

=== Somaliland ===
According to 2010 gun control law residents of Somaliland are allowed to possess firearms for the purpose of defense of life and property. The law specifies pistols and AK automatic rifles as permissible while also mentioning that others can be allowed. Only one weapon of each type can be registered. Possession of more than one weapon of each type require justification and is granted only for legal persons. Permits to register a weapon are provided to people over 18 without criminal background. Permit must be renewed every year. Both citizens and residents can register firearms and they can be inherited. Sale of firearms is limited to government and licensed dealers. Weapons of war such as mortars, bombs, chemical weapons as well as suppressors are prohibited. Openly carrying firearms is prohibited. (Note: Somalialand: "Tłumacz" (PDF). Archived from the original on 7 May 2021.) As the arms embargo on Somalia was lifted, the Somaliland government opposed the measure.

=== South Africa ===
To apply for a firearm license in South Africa applicants must pass a competency test covering the specific type of firearm that is being applied for, and a test on the South African firearm laws. Once these tests are passed one needs to apply for a competency certificate, where the South African Police Service performs a background check. After both tests are passed and the respective certificates are awarded, one can then apply for a firearm license in categories ranging from self-defence to professional hunting. Different license categories have different restrictions, for example the amount of ammunition owners may hold. Using guns to hunt is permitted.

== Americas ==
=== Argentina ===
Firearms in Argentina are restricted, being regulated by ANMaC (Agencia Nacional de Materiales Controlados) since October 2015. Said agency replaced RENAR (Registro Nacional de Armas de la Republica Argentina), both being a branch of the Ministry of Justice and Human Rights. To own a firearm in Argentina, one must be a legitimate user. Applicants must: be 18 years of age or older, provide a medical certificate that certifies they are physically and mentally fit, complete a safety course, provide a legitimate means of income, and undergo and pass a background check. A successful applicant is fingerprinted and issued a license which has to be renewed every five years. One may not legally discharge a firearm in Argentina if they are not a legitimate user, even if that gun belongs to someone else. Once a legitimate user wants to purchase a firearm, they must provide a secure location to store the firearm(s), and give an acceptable reason for wanting a firearm – such as collecting, target shooting, hunting, business, or self-defense in the home.

Firearms must be purchased through a licensed registry registered with the ANMaC. If a firearm is inherited, a re-registering form must be filed. There is no limit on the number of firearms owned so long as they are properly stored. Ammunition sales are recorded but unlimited. Carry permits for licensed handgun owners are extremely difficult to obtain, and require appearing before the ANMaC board to make their case. Carry permits are renewed yearly to re-examine their "clear and present" danger, and the permit is usually revoked immediately if this danger is removed. Those dealing in money or valuables or in private security may be issued a business carry permit.

Handguns above .32 calibre are conditional-use; fully automatic handguns are prohibited to civilians. Bolt-action rifles above .22, long rifles and semi-automatic rifles above .22, and long rifles with a non-detachable magazine are conditional-use; fully automatic rifles and semi-automatic rifles above .22, and long rifles with detachable magazines are prohibited. Semi-automatic shotguns and shotguns with barrels between 380 and 600 mm (15 and 24 in) long are conditional-use; fully automatic shotguns and shotguns with barrels under 380 mm (15 in) are prohibited.

=== Belize ===
Permanent residents or citizens of Belize are allowed to own a gun after a background check. The maximum caliber is 9mm, and one may have only 100 rounds at any given time. Licenses are available to farmers to have shotguns to protect livestock, as well as for hunting and personal protection. Firearms may be imported but must be declared before arrival. Imported guns will be impounded by the police and registered before a license is granted.

=== Brazil ===
All firearms in Brazil are required to be registered. The minimum age for ownership is 25, and certificates of aptitude and mental health are required prior to the acquisition of a firearm and every ten years thereafter.

It is generally illegal to carry a firearm outside one's residence, commerce/store or farm.

Executive Order No. 5.123, of 1 July 2004 allows the Federal Police to confiscate firearms which are not possessed for a valid reason.

The total number of firearms in Brazil is thought to be between 14 million and 17 million with an estimated 9 million being unregistered. In a 2005 referendum, Brazilians voted against a government proposal for a total ban on the sales of firearms to private citizens.

In January 2019, President Bolsonaro signed an executive order which loosened Brazil's gun laws by removing the police's discretionary power to reject license applications.

Currently there are more than one million guns legally registered by civilians.

In September 2022 the Minister of Supreme Court Edson Fachin invalidated some decrees signed by President Bolsonaro. Those decisions were named ADI 6119, ADI 6139 and ADI 6466. The immediate action of those ADIs were the ban to purchase any firearm for home protection and the purchase of ammunition for any civilian in the country. Those ADIs also affected shooting sports in some degree, by forbidding the acquisition of firearms of restricted calibers.

=== Canada ===
Canada's firearm laws are stated in the Firearms Act. The possession and acquisition licence (PAL) is distributed by the Canadian Firearms Program (a program operated within the RCMP) and requires taking firearms safety courses (for non-restricted and restricted classifications) and passing a written and practical test with 80% or higher, an enhanced background check, and interviews with conjugal partner and references. The Non-restricted PAL allows purchase of most common sporting rifles and shotguns. A Restricted-PAL (RPAL) has an additional course for restricted firearms (mostly handguns), which have additional storage and transport requirements as well as required registration. The two main reasons for owning firearms are target shooting and hunting. Only Non-restricted firearms can be used for hunting.

Carrying firearms for self-defense against human threats is prohibited without a permit. These permits are typically only issued to police, and those in a profession that involves carrying valuable goods, such as armoured car personnel. The RCMP is also able to issue an Authorization to Carry permit to private individuals on the basis that a person's life is in imminent danger and police protection is inadequate. These permits are seldom issued. In the 1990s, Toronto City Councillor Norm Gardner was revealed to hold such a permit when he shot a man who was committing a robbery. As of October 2018, only two permits for protection of life were actively issued in the country.

An Authorization to Carry permit can be obtained for protection against wild animals. However these are only issued to a licensed professional trapper, or to people in a profession that exposes them to dangerous animals in remote areas. However, the applicant must prove why carrying a rifle or shotgun is not possible, and they must choose a firearm that is appropriate for the circumstances.

In Canada, firearms fall into one of three categories:

1. Non-Restricted: Long rifles and shotguns with an overall length greater than 26 inches (660 mm) and semi-automatics with a barrel longer than 18.5 inches (470 mm). These can be possessed with an ordinary PAL, and are the only class of firearms which can be used for hunting.
2. Restricted: This includes handguns with barrel lengths greater than 4.1 inches (105 mm), and long guns which do not meet the length requirements for non-restricted but are not prohibited. These guns require ATTs, and registration, and they can only be discharged at ranges.
3. Prohibited: These weapons generally cannot be possessed by civilians, and include fully automatic firearms and many modern military arms, military-grade assault rifles, and handguns with barrel length equal to or shorter than 4.1 inches (105 mm), and those chambered for .25 and .32 cartridges. Normally, the only way to possess these is by being grandfathered in or through inheritance. Most magazines for semi-automatic long guns capable of holding more than 5 centerfire cartridges or 10 rounds for handguns are prohibited.

Restricted and Prohibited firearms can only be used at an approved shooting range, must be registered, and cannot be used for hunting. Transportation of firearms that meet these classifications are restricted by an Authorization to Transport (ATT) permit, and they can only be transported to and from approved ranges in a locked case.

Non-citizens may obtain a non-resident firearms declaration from a customs officer, for a temporary 60-day authorization to bring a non-restricted firearm into Canada.

=== Chile ===
In Chile, the 103rd article of the Constitution declares gun ownership as a privilege granted in accordance to a special law. Firearms are regulated by the police. Civilian gun ownership is allowed by law but discouraged by authorities, with regular press statements and campaigns denouncing the dangers of possessing firearms.

Police-issued firearm permits require applicants to be 18 years of age, provide a mental health certificate issued by a psychiatrist, have a clean criminal record with no domestic violence accusations, and pass a written test on firearm safety and knowledge. Final approval lies in a district police commander, who can deny the permit in "justified cases" not detailed by the law. There are five types of permits:

- A defense permit allowing ownership of 2 firearms which must remain at the declared address.
- A hunting permit requiring a hunting license, and allowing up to 6 firearms.
- A sporting permit requiring membership in a registered gun club, and also allowing up to 6 firearms. It is possible for those under 18 years of age to obtain this permit.
- A collection permit allows up to 100 firearms to be owned, and does not allow the holder to possess ammunition.

Each of these permits has limits on types of firearms used, and allows for a police-issued permit to buy a specified quantity of appropriate ammunition from a specific gun shop. Transport permits are required to take firearms from the permit-holder's residence to a specified shooting range or hunting ground, and are valid for two years. Transported firearms must be unloaded and not attached to the body.

A self-defense permit allows carrying a firearm for protection against specific human threats. Such permits are valid for one year, but as the police commander can deny applications without stating a reason, they are very rarely issued. Automatic firearms are forbidden for civilian use.

=== Cuba ===
Gun control law enacted in 2008 in Cuba divides firearm licenses in to six categories:

- First self-defense permit allows possession and carry of pistols or revolvers. It is issued for people who require them due to their job in security or who are authorized by the Ministry of Interior,
- Second self-defense permit allows carry of pistols, revolvers and shotguns by employees of security companies during their duty,
- Hunting permit allows possession of shotguns,
- Sport shooting permit allows possession, carry and use in authorized places of rifles, shotguns, pistols and revolvers,
- Fifth permit allows possession, carry and use of firearms for the hunting, sport shooting and scientific purposes by legal entities.
- Collection permit allows possession of firearms with historical value.

=== Colombia ===
Article 3 of Colombia's firearm law states that civilians may possess firearms only via permit issued at discretion of the competent authority.

In 1993, Colombia legislated gun ownership, effectively establishing a government licensing monopoly. In 2016, president of Colombia Juan Manuel Santos signed an executive order suspending civilians from carrying firearms, with some exceptions including security details, hunting, private defense and collection. It was extended in 2018 by newly elected president Ivan Duque, albeit with the added stipulation: "for reasons of emergency or security ... taking into consideration among other factors, the particular circumstances of each application". A legal challenge to this modification has been prepared.

=== Costa Rica ===
Only citizens and permanent residents of Costa Rica are allowed to possess firearms: handguns (up to three), rifles (up to three for sporting use; hunting is illegal in Costa Rica), and semi-automatic weapons between the calibers of 5.6 to 18.5 millimeters.

Foreigners wishing to bring guns into the country must apply with the Ministry of Public Security and declare it when they arrive to the customs department, who will hold it until they go through the registration process. Firearms can be purchased from a licensed gun shop or private individual. Gun owners must have a clean criminal record in Costa Rica and must pass a psychological exam.

=== El Salvador ===
El Salvador's laws aim to allow and regulate civilian possession of firearms. In order to get a firearm license one must have no criminal record, be at least 21 years of age(24 for a carry license), pay for a tax stamp, and undergo a written test. In 2017 there were 344,587 registered firearms in El Salvador, or 5.6 per 100 people.

=== Greenland ===
Possession of most long guns is allowed without a permit in Greenland, while semi- and fully-automatic firearms and handguns require a permit. In 2018, proposed amendment to firearm law would raise the minimum age to purchase guns to 16.

=== Haiti ===
The constitution of Haiti provides citizens with the constitutional right to possess firearms at home. Only police and military can possess rifles. Handguns are allowed to be carried open or concealed with the correct license issued by the Haitian National Police assigned to the serial number of the firearm and with the name of the individual or organization responsible for the firearm.

=== Honduras ===
Gun laws in Honduras are stated in the Act on the Control of Firearms, Ammunition, Explosives and Other Related Material of 2000. In April 2002, the National Arms Registry was formed, requiring all citizens to register their firearms with the Ministry of Defense.

In 2003, a ban on certain "assault rifles" was passed, restricting citizens from possessing military-style rifles such as the AK-47 and the M-16. In 2007, an additional decree suspended the right to openly carry and conceal carry a firearm in public, and limited the number of firearms a person can possess.

=== Jamaica ===
Gun laws in Jamaica are stated in the Firearms Act and regulated by the Firearms Licensing Authority. Applicants must pass a police background check and complete a certification process to obtain a firearms license for shotguns, handguns and rifles. Shotguns and rifles for hunting or sport-shooting purposes are easier to obtain than handguns. Fully automatic weapons are prohibited. Handguns are limited to those under .45 calibre for revolvers or 10 mm for pistols. Ammunition purchases are limited to 250 rounds per year for shotguns and 50 for handguns, with applications for additional ammunition generally granted during the hunting season. A gun safe is required for storage of all firearms and ammunition. Once licensed, no additional permit is required to carry a firearm open or concealed, unless the carrying of firearms has been temporarily prohibited under section 22 of the Act.

=== Mexico ===
Under the Mexican Constitution, Article 10, citizens and legal residents have the right to own and carry arms, but may only carry them in accordance with police regulations, i.e. Article 32 of the "Ley Federal de Armas de Fuego y Explosivos". Applicants must: have a clear criminal record; proven income and residence (i.e.: cannot be homeless); undergone compulsory military service; a clean bill of health (including drug tests); justified the weapon's use; be employed. New firearms are purchased through the Ministry of Defense. Prohibited weapons include: large-calibre handguns; shotguns with barrels shorter than 25 inches (640 mm) or bore greater than 12 gauge; and rifles which are fully automatic or of large calibre. One handgun is permitted for home defense, but it must be registered within 30 days of purchase. For hunting and sport shooting, up to nine long guns and one handgun is permitted, requiring membership in a hunting or shooting club. Collectors may be authorized to possess additional and prohibited weapons. A carry license may be issued to those employed by private security firms, and certain weapons are exclusive to the armed forces. Licenses must be renewed biennially.

=== Panama ===
Obtaining firearms in Panama requires a Firearms Possession Certificate (FPC), which requires: criminal background check, drugs test, psychological test and firearms training. The minimum age to own a firearm is 18. The FPC allows the owner to move the firearms, unloaded and stowed, to and from a gun range. At least 6 hours of annual gun range practice is mandatory. There are no firearm caliber nor magazine capacity restrictions and all kinds of semiautomatic weapons are allowed for civilian ownership. Automatic weapons may only be owned by the state. Ammunition is restricted by type. Tracer, incendiary, armor-piercing and explosive ammunition is prohibited to civilians. An FPC is valid for 10 years.

Concealed carry of firearms is allowed through a Firearms Carry License (FCL). An FCL has the same requirements as an FPC, but carrier must be at least 21 years of age. Only handguns, such as pistols and revolvers, are permitted for concealed carry; however, up to two handguns may be carried loaded simultaneously. An FCL is valid for 4 years.

The Public Security Ministry handles all firearm matters. All legally owned firearms must be registered to their owners and appear on their permits. Direct or private handover of firearms is prohibited. A buyer must submit an application to the Security Ministry which, if approved, will deliver the updated permits and the firearms directly to the owner. No private owner may take out a firearm directly from a dealer. A shall-issue permit policy apply for all permits; the state must issue a permit if applicant meets all requirements. Firearm applications must be resolved in 30 business days or less.

Importation of firearms is only allowed to authorized local dealers. An individual may not privately import his/her own firearms while immigrating from another country. Firearms may temporarily be taken out of the country for sport events or repairs.

Firearms are regulated by Article 312 of the Panamanian Constitution of 1972 and the General Firearms, Ammunition and Related Materials Act (Law 57 of 2011).

=== Paraguay ===
In order to get a firearm possession license one must have no criminal records, be at least 22 years of age, and obtain certificate of safely handling a firearm. Carry permit requires a good reason. Automatic weapons are prohibited. As of 2014, there are 392,000 registered firearms and 1,961 carry permits issued to civilians.

=== United States ===
Requirement to obtain a concealed carry permit by state/territory (2025): Permit not required Permit required

A map of open carry laws in the United States: Legal with no permit/license required Legal with no permit/license required; possible local restrictions Legal with permit/license Illegal

In the United States, firearms are regulated by both federal and individual state statutes. Federal firearms laws are enforced by the Bureau of Alcohol, Tobacco, Firearms and Explosives (ATF). State and local firearms laws, which vary greatly, are enforced by state and local authorities. The right to keep and bear arms has been protected by the Second Amendment to the Constitution since 1791, and the U.S. Supreme Court ruled that it protects any individual's right to keep and bear arms unconnected with service in a militia for traditionally lawful purposes, such as self-defense within the home and in public, in District of Columbia v. Heller (2008) and New York State Rifle & Pistol Association, Inc. v. Bruen (2022). The Supreme Court affirmed in McDonald v. City of Chicago (2010) that the Second Amendment is incorporated by the Due Process Clause of the Fourteenth Amendment and thereby applies to state and local laws as well as federal laws. Most state constitutions also guarantee this right, although there is some variance across the country as both federal and state laws apply to firearm possession and ownership.

Firearm ownership in the United States is by right and does not require licensure or proof of need. Federally, there is a minimum age of 18 to possess a handgun, with no minimum age for long guns. To purchase from a licensed dealer, one must be 18 for long guns and 21 for handguns. The respective age requirements apply to purchasing ammunition from a dealer, retail store or online.

Federally, new firearms must be transferred by a federally licensed dealer (FFL) with form 4473 and background check. Used firearms transferred interstate must also go through an FFL. Intrastate private party sales are not required to use an FFL under federal law, but many states require FFLs to conduct private party transfers.

Federal law does not limit the number of firearms or quantity of ammunition and reloading supplies a private citizen may keep.

Air guns, antique ignition (muzzle loading) guns and guns made prior to 1899 are not firearms under U.S. law, although they are still considered deadly weapons.

Federal law designates two classes of firearms in the United States:

Title I, GCA firearms: This includes all handguns, rifles with at least 16" barrel and 26" overall length, Shotguns with at least 18" barrel and 26" overall length, other firearms with an overall length of 26" or more which are neither handgun nor long gun. Sporting arms over .50 caliber are title I; non-sporting arms over .50 caliber fall into the Title II category below.

Title II, NFA Firearms. NFA firearms include:

- Machine guns (fully automatic firearms; those that can fire more than one shot by a single function of the trigger)
- Short Barreled Rifles (<16" rifled barrel or <26" OAL)
- Short Barreled Shotguns(<18" smoothbore barrel or <26" OAL)
- Destructive Devices (Non-sporting weapons over .50 caliber, anything with more than 1/4 ounce explosives content)
- Any Other Weapon (generally, firearms which do not look like firearms or which would be a smoothbore "other firearm" except that its overall length is too short)
- Silencers (suppressors; any device designed or redesigned and intended to reduce the report of a gunshot). Sound suppressors which are permanently attached to a non-firearm (e.g. air rifle, muzzle-loader) are not considered firearm silencers and are not regulated.

Non-prohibited persons over 21 years of age may own NFA firearms in most states, though some states prohibit some or all of this class. NFA firearms must be registered and go through a manufacturing or transfer approval by ATF before the individual may make or take possession of the weapon. This process can take months, sometimes even years. It requires fingerprinting, photo ID and a tax of $200 per application (per weapon).

Fully-automatic firearms (machine guns) are heavily restricted and can only be owned by private citizens if manufactured and registered before 18 May 1986. unless an individual is to obtain status as an SOT "Special Occupational Taxpayer" as a FFL "Federal Firearms License" holder. Since civilians without SOT status are only allowed to own machine guns manufactured before 1986, the finite supply has caused the market value of pre-1986 transferable automatic weapons to be 20 to 50 times that of their semiautomatic counterparts (2022 ex.,$500–$800 for a basic AR-15, $20,000-$25,000 for an M-16)

Law varies greatly from state to state, both in its scope and in its range.

Pursuant to 18 U.S.C. § 922 – Unlawful Acts, persons are prohibited from possessing firearms or ammunition if:

- They have been convicted of a felony, or any other crime for which they could have been sentenced to more than a year in prison, or are under indictment for such
- They are a fugitive from justice
- They have been convicted of a misdemeanor crime of domestic violence
- They are an unlawful user of, or addicted to, any illegal controlled substance
- They have been adjudicated mentally defective
- They have been discharged from the Armed Forces under dishonorable conditions
- They have renounced their United States citizenship

The carrying of weapons, either openly or concealed, is regulated by the states, and these laws have changed rapidly beginning in the latter part of the 20th century. Some states allow residents to carry without a permit, while others only allow the public carry of firearms upon issuance of a permit or license. Under the Law Enforcement Officers Safety Act, current and former law enforcement officers can carry anywhere (except private property where they are subject to the rules of the owner and gun-free public places like schools) as long as they carry a photo identification from their agency and have completed yearly training from said agency.

Federal law provides protection for travellers who may find themselves going through states with more restrictive gun laws than their origin or destination. As long as the weapons are transported in accordance with FOPA and the weapon(s) are legally owned and not prohibited in the origin or destination(s), the travellers are immune from prosecution.

Being engaged in the business of importing firearms, dealing firearms, gunsmithing or manufacturing arms requires licensure in the United States. There are multiple license types, depending on the nature of the business, and some licenses have additional requirements, such as registration with Directorate of Defense Trade Controls.

Private citizens in the United States may manufacture weapons for personal use without government approval or registration for Title I GCA firearms (NFA rules still apply to home made weapons). It becomes unlawful to manufacture without a license if the intent is to distribute.

The United States federal government is prohibited by law from maintaining a registry of firearms owners, although the NFA registry which predated this prohibition has been exempted. Some states do have registration.

=== Uruguay ===
Uruguayan law allows for firearm possession on a shall-issue basis. These firearms must be of a caliber smaller than .50 BMG. Carry permits are issued on a may-issue basis, which in practice is no-issue except for people working as private security guards. Policemen and military can carry their firearms while off-duty without the need for a licence. The legal carrying of firearms must always be in a concealed manner, no open carry is allowed. In recent times, politicians from the governing coalition have expressed their intentions of allowing the issuing of concealed carry permits to civilians. With approximately 35 civilian firearms per 100 people, Uruguay is the eighth most armed country in the world and most armed in Latin America.

=== Venezuela ===
During the dictatorship of Juan Vicente Gómez, in 1914, a disarmament decree in the Federal District was enacted, and later in 1919, a disarmament law was decreed, ordering every weapon owner to give them away to the authorities; the only exceptions were machetes and hunting shotguns. The official justification offered was to diminish crime, but the law was ultimately used to disarm the population and to prevent possible uprisings. Historian Manuel Caballero argued that while Gómez's final intention was to prevent his enemies from obtaining weapons, the law contributed to avoid civil wars in Venezuela for the next century.

In 2012 Venezuela banned private sales of firearms and ammunition hoping to lower crime rates. The Army, police, and certain groups trusted by the government (colectivos) are exempted from the ban and can buy firearms from state-owned manufacturers. In 2013 Venezuela stopped issuing new firearm licenses. In 2017 government banned carrying firearms in public places.

== Asia ==
=== Afghanistan ===
Owning or carrying firearms in Afghanistan is strictly regulated by law, which requires licenses or permits. Automatic rifles and handguns are mostly used by the Afghan Armed Forces, Afghan National Police and other such government forces. Shotguns are popular in some regions as self-defense weapons.

=== Bangladesh ===
Gun laws are very restrictive in Bangladesh. Only people over the age of 25 (30 for handguns) and under 60 who pay taxes can apply for firearm licence. Self-defence is only accepted reason and requires proving danger to life. Legal owners can only own one long gun (shotgun or rifle) and one handgun (pistol or revolver). They cannot work as security guards.

=== Brunei ===
Firearms are prohibited for citizens. Military and police personnel may apply for a licence to keep a private firearm by establishing a genuine reason, such as sport shooting or gun collecting.

=== Cambodia ===
Firearms are completely prohibited for civilian use without exceptions since 1999.

=== China ===
Gun ownership in the People's Republic of China (PRC) is regulated by law. Generally, private citizens are not allowed to possess guns. Civilian ownership of guns is largely restricted to authorized, non-individual entities, including sporting organizations, authorized hunting reserves, and wildlife protection, management and research organizations. The chief exception to the general ban on individual firearm ownership is for the purpose of hunting. Illegal possession or sale of firearms may result in a minimum punishment of three years in prison, and penalties for the trafficking of "arms and ammunition or other military materials to an enemy during war time" include life imprisonment.

==== Hong Kong and Macau ====
In Hong Kong and Macau, gun ownership is tightly controlled and possession is mainly in the hands of law enforcement, military, and private security firms (providing protection for jewelers and banks). Under Section 13 of Cap 238 Firearms and Ammunition Ordinance of Hong Kong, a license is required for unrestricted firearms and ammunition. A license may be issued after a rigorous process to check for criminal records or a history of mental illness. License holders may store other firearms at home in a locked box, but ammunition must be kept at different premises. Only fully automatic firearms appear prohibited; those found in possession without a license could be fined at level 6 of the standard scale ("Maximum fine of HKD $100,000") and face imprisonment for up to 14 years.

=== India ===
Guns in India are regulated by law. The Arms Act, 1959 and the Arms Rules 1962 prohibit the sale, manufacture, possession, acquisition, import, export, and transport of firearms and ammunition unless under a license, which is difficult to obtain. The Indian Government has a monopoly over the production and sale of firearms, with the exception of some breech-loading smooth-bore shotguns, of which a limited number may be produced and imported. The Arms Act classifies firearms into two categories: Prohibited Bore (PB) and Non-Prohibited Bore (NPB), where all semi-automatic and fully automatic firearms fall under the Prohibited Bore category. The Arms Act of 1962 added to the Prohibited bore category, any firearm which can chamber and fire ammunition of calibers .303, 7.62 mm, .410, .380, .455, .45 rimless, or 9 mm. Smooth-bore guns having barrels shorter than 20 Inches (508 mm) are also specified as Prohibited guns.

Licenses for acquisition and possession of both PB and NPB firearms could be given by a state government or district magistrate before 1987. Since that year, issuing of licenses for PB firearms became the responsibility of the central government. Licenses are valid for five years and may be renewed after the term. The sale of firearms requires both the selling and purchasing party to possess a permit.

The criteria considered during issuing of NPB firearm permits are whether the applicant faces a threat to their life. PB firearms criteria are more stringent, often for persons in government positions who face immediate danger or threats, those whose occupations involve open threats and danger, and their immediate family members. PB licenses were tightened since 2014, when otherwise-eligible persons started to be frequently rejected on basis of national security grounds. Exceptions are made for defense officers, who are allowed to keep firearms without licenses under the Defence Service rule, and a handful of professional shooters.

Firearm licenses are issued on a may-issue basis and approximately half of applications are accepted. For example, between April 2015 and March 2016 authorities in Mumbai rejected 169 out of 342 firearm applications.

=== Indonesia ===
In Indonesia, gun licenses are only issued to civilians employed in a profession that involves using firearms, such as in the military and law enforcement, with an exception made for politicians and businessmen.

Applicants must be over the age of 21 to obtain a firearms license, and go through a background check and mental evaluation. They must also state a genuine reason for wanting to own a firearm, which can include hunting, target shooting, collecting, security, and self-defense. All firearms must be registered. Gun permits are valid for five years and may be renewed. Illegal gun ownership can be punished from a maximum of 20 years in prison to life in prison and death as per the provisions of Emergency Act no. 12, 1951.

Civilians cannot possess military weapons, but may possess long rifles chambered in 22 regardless of cartridge length or whether it is a centerfire or rimfire bullet. In 2012 however, it was claimed that police had been issuing permits to regular citizens.

=== Iran ===
There are 200,000 firearms registered with nomads. Iranian law had changed in 2021–22 with military, security and police having permit to access firearms use them preemptively. Airguns, airsoft guns and hunting rifles were criminalized in September 2023.

=== Iraq ===
In 2012, Iraq relaxed its gun laws. The "possession of one rifle or pistol per home" was allowed via simple registration at local police stations.

In 2017, the law was relaxed once again. The possession and carrying of handguns, semi-automatic rifles, and other weapons for self-defense, hunting and sport shooting purposes was allowed. Firearm licenses require official authorization and identity cards.

=== Israel ===
Gun laws in Israel are comprehensive despite soldiers being allowed to carry their service weapons on or off duty. Civilians must obtain a firearms license to lawfully acquire, possess, sell or transfer firearms and ammunition. In 2018, Israel loosened firearms restrictions, allowing all citizens who had undergone combat training and qualified in Advanced Infantry Training ('Rifleman "07"') to apply for a private handgun license.

Prior to 2018, only a small group of people had been eligible for firearms licenses: certain retired military personnel, police officers or prison guards; Israeli residents of the occupied West Bank or those who often work there; and licensed hunters and animal-control officers. Age requirements vary: 21 for those who completed military service or civil service equivalent, 27 otherwise, and 45 for non-citizens. Firearm license applicants must have been a resident of Israel for at least three consecutive years, pass a background check (criminal, health, and mental history), establish a so-called "genuine reason" for possessing a firearm (such as self-defense, hunting, or sport), and pass a weapons-training course. As many as 40% of applications for firearms permits were rejected.

Those holding firearms licenses must renew them and pass a shooting course every three years. Security guards must pass these tests to renew their license to carry firearms belonging to their employers. Applicants must demonstrate that they have a safe at their residence in which to keep the firearm. Permits are given only for personal use, and holders for self-defense purposes may own only one handgun and purchase an annual supply of 50 cartridges (although more may be purchased to replace rounds used at a firing range).

Most individuals who are licensed to possess handguns may carry them loaded in public, concealed or openly.

In 2005, there were 237,000 private citizens and 154,000 security guards licensed to carry firearms. Another 34,000 Israelis own guns illegally due to their failure to renew their firearms license. In 2007, there were estimated to be 500,000 licensed small arms held by civilians, in addition to 1,757,500 by the military, and 26,040 by the police.

==== 2023 Israel–Gaza war ====
Following the October 7 attacks and outbreak of the Gaza war in 2023, Israel almost immediately reacted strongly in favor of loosening gun restrictions in favor of a more liberal access for Israeli civilians to have firearms to defend themselves and their communities. The Israeli government also called on civilians that did find a way to arm themselves to band together and form protective groups in light of the attack initiated out of Gaza. The Times of Israel reported, "The reform was unveiled by Public Security Minister Gilad Erdan, who has pushed for allowing more Israelis to arm themselves as a response to terror attacks." Left-wing party Meretz opposed the changes, with party member Tamar Zandberg saying in a statement, "...[guns] are a death machine whose civilian use needs to be reduced as much as possible...", Erdan in turn argued that, "Qualified citizens carrying firearms in public contribute to the sense of security, are an important line of defense from 'lone-wolf' attacks and thus strengthen public security.", and "Many citizens have saved lives during terror attacks, and in the era of 'lone-wolf' attacks, the more qualified gun-carrying citizens there are — the better the chance to thwart terror attacks without casualties and reduce the number of casualties."

National Security Minister Itamar Ben-Gvir was quoted in a report from Fox News as saying:

When civilians have guns, they can defend themselves.

Ben-Gvir issued an emergency directive after the attack to loosen gun restrictions for Israeli civilians in several ways, however, reportedly the comments section on the social media site X (formerly Twitter) had many people saying that this was, "too little too late."

American and international media outlets reacted largely critical of Israel's historically strict gun laws that potentially served to endanger Israelis by leaving them defenseless in many cases as the surprise attack unfolded. Only 2% of Israeli civilians were armed prior to the attack according to a report from the BBC, compared to as little as 30% of American civilians (though that number may be much higher due to gunowners that do not report accurately).

A rabbi in Israel named Raz Blizovsky was quoted as saying:

People are changing their opinion [after the attack], and now there is more awareness. I have been involved with groups that have been talking about this issue [loosening gun restrictions for civilians] for years. During calm times, people don't do anything.

Israel citizens also petitioned their government by the tens of thousands to further loosen gun laws for Israeli and Jewish civilians in light of the prior laws that made it very difficult to acquire guns and possess the means for Israeli civilians to defend themselves. One petition gathered as many as 22,000 signatures in less than 24 hours seeking to loosen restrictions on Israeli civilians buying and carrying firearms.

=== Japan ===
The weapons law of Japan begins by stating "No one shall possess a firearm or firearms or a sword or swords", and very few exceptions are allowed. Citizens are permitted to possess firearms for hunting and sport shooting, but only after submitting to a lengthy licensing procedure. As part of the procedure, a shooting-range test must be passed with a "mark of at least 95%". A mental-health evaluation taking place at a hospital, and a thorough background check where one's family and friends are interviewed, are also part of the procedure.

A gun license expires after three years, after which license tests must be repeated. After ten years of shotgun ownership, a license-holder may apply to obtain a rifle.

Japan has been described as the country with "perhaps the first ever gun buyback initiative" in 1685, and is the first nation to have imposed gun laws in the world; as such, gun ownership is very rare: 0.6 guns per 100 people in 2007. When mass killings occur, they are often perpetrated by assailants wielding knives or other means, not guns. In 2014, Japan saw six gun deaths.

Each prefecture in the country can operate a total of three gun shops. New cartridges can only be purchased after turning in expended cartridges. In turn, new magazines can be bought only by trading in old ones. If a gun owner dies, their relatives must surrender their firearms. Police officers are expected to be proficient in judo to subdue suspects without firearms; police are often armed, but rarely fire their weapons in the course of duty and are not allowed to carry weapons when off-duty.

=== Jordan ===
According to Jordanian law on gun control passed in 1952 Jordanian residents are allowed to keep rifles and handguns at their home with amount of ammunition necessary for self-defense provided they obtain a permit. Permits are denied for people under 21 and convicted of any crimes. Possession and carrying of automatic firearms require special permit.

In 2019 a law was proposed that would ban both semi- and fully-automatic firearms in Jordan.

=== Kuwait ===
Firearms may be licensed to a citizen (or foreigner recommended by the Minister of Interior) who is at least 25 years old and fully capable of handling a weapon, with no criminal record, who is not a suspect or under police surveillance, and who has a source of income. Hunting shotguns are the most commonly licensed weapons. Rifles chambered for .22 long rifle are also common, with hunting rifles being more difficult to obtain. Handguns are only allowed for VIPs. Machine guns are not legally permitted for civilian possession.

=== Lebanon ===
In the Lebanese Republic, ownership of any firearm other than handguns, hunting arms or antiques is illegal and only the latter two are permitted to leave the owner's home. Disregard for this law is prevalent. Lebanon does not officially grant the right to bear arms, but it is a firmly held cultural belief in the country. Firearm licenses are granted to certain individuals, but the test is not open to the public and requires a particular need to be demonstrated.

Gun control has been largely unsuccessful in Lebanon due to a historic context of gun availability and usage, a lack of effective central government control or authority over many parts of the country, and the tumultuous nature of the region. Although gunsmithing was once prominent in the region, it has all but ceased since the mid-1930s, yet it remains legal with a permit. Lebanon has come to be one of the largest arms markets in the Middle East.

Lebanon ranks 58th worldwide for privately owned firearms per capita.

=== Malaysia ===
Firearm ownership is highly restricted in Malaysia. The Arms Act 1960 requires Malaysian citizens to have a license for the manufacture, import, export, repair, or ownership of firearms. A firearm license can only be granted by the Chief Police Officer of a state. Prior to 2023, under the Firearms (Increased Penalties) Act 1971, the only punishment for discharging a firearm in crimes such as extortion, robbery, resisting arrest and house-breaking is the death penalty. Being an accomplice to such offence will also receive the same penalty. Exhibiting a firearm for any of the scheduled offences (without discharging) carries a penalty of life imprisonment and caning of not less than 6 strokes. Possession of unlawful firearms carries a sentence of up to fourteen years in prison and caning.

In 2023, the Abolition of Mandatory Death Penalty Act 2023 abolished the death penalty and life imprisonment under the two firearms laws and replaced them with 30 to 40 years imprisonment, accompanying by at least 12 or at least 6 strokes of the cane.

=== Mongolia ===
Mongolia currently observes a law on firearms passed in 2001 which allows anyone to apply for a firearm license, which may be issued after 21 days.

There are 46,982 (or 1.6 per 100 people) registered firearms in Mongolia including 44,306 for hunting, 1,598 for security and ward use, 619 for sports training, 260 as "art" firearms and 199 for collection purposes.

=== Myanmar ===
The right to firearm ownership, which is primarily governed by the Weapons Act of 1878, is generally restricted in Myanmar. The law has been amended several times, and generally provides citizens with a right to own firearms for self-defence. Since the 1962 Burmese coup d'état, successive military regimes have restricted legal gun ownership to individuals closely connected with the regimes, including army veterans. After the 1962 coup, the government confiscated all citizen-owned firearms, which were re-distributed to Burma Socialist Programme Party members, retired civil servants, and army veterans.

After the 2021 Myanmar coup d'état and ensuing civil war, the military regime has revisited existing gun laws as part of an effort to combat pro-democracy forces. On 31 January 2023, the Ministry of Home Affairs issued a directive enabling organisations and citizens deemed "loyal to the state," including civilians, civil servants, and army personnel, to obtain firearm licences and permits. The directive stipulates that firearm applicants must be at least 18 years old, and must demonstrate a need for firearms for "personal security." The directive was enacted into law on 11 May 2023 as the "Weapons Law", officially State Administration Council Law 49/2023. The permitting process explicitly does not ask how the applicant acquired the firearm and munitions, only that information on it be submitted with the application. Government employees are allowed up to 3 firearms, including pistols, rifles and machine guns. The regulatory shift has enabled the military junta to arm pro-regime paramilitary groups like the Pyusawhti militias and to suppress pro-democracy forces in the country, in light of waning military recruitment and their challenges in concurrently operating in multiple war theatres throughout the country.

=== Nepal ===
Nepal allows firearm ownership if an applicant can provide sufficient reason, for example hunting or self-defense.

There are 34,315 (or 0.1 per 100 people) registered firearms in Nepal including 13,892 shotguns, 312 pistols and 118 revolvers.

=== North Korea ===
According to 2009 law civilian possession of firearms is prohibited in North Korea.

=== Pakistan ===
Pakistan has permissive firearm laws compared to the rest of South Asia, and has the sixth-highest number of privately owned guns in the world. Laws regulate the carrying of weapons in public in most urban areas. Private guns are prohibited in educational institutions, hostels, boarding and lodging houses, fairs, gatherings or processions of a political, religious, ceremonial, or sectarian character, and on the premises of courts of law or public offices. The law in Pakistan does not stipulate whether gun licenses should be denied or revoked, and a license permits ownership of any number of weapons including handguns of any size and fully automatic weapons. Firearms are a traditionally important part of rural life in its North-Western areas where it is not uncommon to see people legally carrying RPGs and fully automatic weapons.

=== Philippines ===
Current gun laws in the Philippines are outlined in Republic Act 10591 or the "Comprehensive Firearms and Ammunition Regulation Act", signed in 2013. In order to own a firearm, a citizen must acquire a License to Own and Possess Firearms (LTOPF). Applicants must meet the following requirements: (a) has not been convicted of any crime involving moral turpitude; (b) has passed the psychiatric test administered by a PNP-accredited psychologist or psychiatrist; (c) has passed the drug test conducted by an accredited and authorized drug testing laboratory or clinic; (d) has passed a gun safety seminar which is administered by the PNP or a registered and authorized gun club; (e) has filed in writing the application to possess a registered firearm which shall state the personal circumstances of the applicant; (f) must present a police clearance from the city or municipality police office; and (g) has not been convicted or is currently an accused in a pending criminal case before any court of law for a crime that is punishable with a penalty of more than two (2) years.

License holders may carry concealed handguns in public with the acquisition of a separate Permit to Carry Firearms Outside of Residence (PTCFOR), which is granted on a may-issue basis. Generally, applicants must demonstrate an imminent threat of danger and secure a Threat Assessment Certificate from the police in order to be issued a PTCFOR. Exempted from this requirement are members of the national bar (lawyers, prosecutors, judges), accountants, accredited media practitioners, cashiers, bank tellers, clergymen (priests, ministers, rabbis, imams), physicians, nurses, engineers, high-risk businessmen, elected incumbent and former officials, and active and retired military and law enforcement personnel, as they are deemed to be in imminent danger due to the nature of their profession, occupation or business.

Many Filipinos own firearms for self-protection and target-shooting, which require licenses: around 2,000,000 people out of 100,000,000 have a registered firearm.

=== Singapore ===
Singaporean citizens must obtain a license to lawfully possess firearms or ammunition; applicants must provide justification for the license, which is often restricted to the military, police, and private security companies. Target-shooting licenses permit ownership of a gun, provided it is securely stored in an approved and protected firing range, and is not taken out of the firing range without special permission. Self-defense permits are not allowed, unless there is an 'imminent threat' to their lives that can be justified to the government. There is no restriction on types of small arms one may own after obtaining a license. Illegal firearms and firearm-related crimes are grounds for the death penalty in Singapore.

Owing to its mandatory national service, nearly half the civilian population have the experience and are well-trained in operating firearms, most notably the M16 and the SAR 21.

=== South Korea ===
Similar to Singapore, the majority of South Korean men are well-trained in the use of firearms, due to mandatory military service. Guns are also notably absent in South Korean society outside of the military, and gun ownership and gun-related deaths rank among the lowest in the world.

South Korea has strict gun policies. Hunting and sporting licenses are issued, but any firearm used in these circumstances must be stored at a local police station. Air rifles also have to be stored at police stations; crossbows and electric shock devices are also classified as firearms but their private retention is permitted. Tasers are prohibited, and possessing a toy gun without an orange tip is strictly prohibited. Violation of firearms laws can result in a US$18,000 fine and up to 10 years in prison.

=== Syria ===
According to 2001 law Syrian citizens and foreign Arabs can own one revolver and two shotguns under license issued for people who can provide genuine reason such as protection of business.

==== Idlib ====
All types of firearms including pistols, rifles and grenades are reportedly sold in rebel-held Idlib district without any license in shops which are mostly run by militia groups. In October 2020 Idlib's Salvation Government reportedly stated it will start licensing firearms. Many other rebel groups expressed opposition to this and some doubted possibility of registering firearms in Idlib.

=== Taiwan ===
Taiwan has extremely strict gun control for all persons in the country, though some carveouts used to be made for indigenous Taiwanese persons. Some argue that the strict policy endangers the homeland to potential invasion by mainland China (China also has strict laws against firearms for civilians). An unusual feature of Taiwan's gun control scheme was a specific provision for indigenous people, allowing black powder muzzleloader-type single shot rifles for hunting, though in the pursuit of a total gun control policy, even indigenous persons of Taiwan have lost their right to use and own even these guns as of 2021. There is an absolute "zero tolerance policy" for owning guns in Taiwan. The indigenous people that were allowed a carve out to the absolute-no-guns policy though are increasingly antagonistic against the mainly Han Chinese that are seen as foreign occupiers that restrict the natural right of indigenous peoples of Taiwan to own and use guns for hunting and other purposes.

=== Thailand ===
A firearm license in Thailand is only granted for the following uses: self-defense, property protection, hunting, or sporting. Applicants for a firearms license must be at least 20 years of age (the age of majority under the Civil and Commercial Code), have a record of good behavior, have an occupation and receive income, and have a permanent address in Thailand with a name "listed in the house registration specifically in the area where you are applying for a license, for at least six months". A license may not be issued to anyone who is a repeat criminal offender or mentally unstable. The application fee for most firearms licenses is 1,000 Baht for each license or unit; a license for possession and use of air rifles is 200 Baht per license/unit.; carry licenses are also 1,000 Baht per license. Since October 2017 citizenship is required to purchase and use firearms. A person is also not allowed to carry his gun without an additional permit for concealed carry. Fully automatic firearms and explosive devices are prohibited.

The amended 2017 law will cover weapon suppressors, electric darts, and new types of fireworks including bang fai (locally made rockets) and talai ("rocket-like fireworks with a circular wing"). The amendment further provides that anyone who creates a bomb scare may be subject to convictions of up to three years of imprisonment and/or fined up to 60,000 Baht. Another significant change is that only Thais will be permitted to register a gun with the authorities. Formerly, foreigners residing in Thailand could also apply for weapons permits. The Act already prohibits the manufacture, purchase, ownership, use, ordering, or import of firearms or ammunition, except by persons who have been granted a license from the local registrar. Violation of this provision is punishable with convictions including imprisonment for a period of between one and ten years and/or fines of between 2,000 and 20,000 Baht.

On 7 August 2026, in the aftermath of the 2026 Nonthaburi Shootings, a former politician named Chalong Riewang shot and killed Thongchai Yenprasert, the local administrative official, after he refused to consult with him about a large sum of money he owed. Chalong did not intend to shoot Thongchai, which he called “his friend”; however when Thongchai’s driver pulled out his gun, aimed at him, Chalong responded by firing four shots at both him and Thongchai. In response to the killing, Prime Minister Anutin Charnvirakul would reiterate his commitment to enforcing stricter gun laws in Thailand.

=== Timor-Leste ===
Under East Timorese law, only the military and police forces may possess, carry and use firearms, with few exceptions.

In late June 2008, the Prime Minister, Xanana Gusmão, introduced a proposed gun law to Parliament for "urgent debate", pushing back scheduled budgetary discussions. The new law, which would allow civilians to own guns, sparked heated debates in the East Timorese parliament. The United Nations, which has a peacekeeping force deployed in the nation, also expressed concerns over the new law. The law was defeated in the Parliament.

=== United Arab Emirates ===
In 2019, the government of the United Arab Emirates relaxed its gun laws. The minimum age to possess firearms was lowered from 25 to 21, while legal owners can now have up to three guns. People from other countries are not allowed to apply for licenses. Most popular purposes to own them include hunting and trap shooting.

Weapons can be purchased during a yearly gun show called Adihex. In 2018, more than 1,764 legal weapons were sold.

Firearm licenses are issued after 60 days of applications to the relevant authority. If there is no response that means that the license has been rejected.

=== Uzbekistan ===
In 2019, the president of Uzbekistan signed a new gun law. It allows citizens to own smooth-bore firearms and firearms with rifled barrels for hunting and sport shooting purposes. Carrying in public places is prohibited and the minimum age is 21 years. Only gas and electric weapons can be used for self-defense purposes. The maximum magazine capacity is ten rounds.

=== Vietnam ===
Firearms in Vietnam are restricted to the military and law enforcement agencies, with possession of firearms prohibited to civilians. The chief exception to this is for hunting and sporting purposes, requiring users to undergo mandatory background checks to be licensed.

=== Yemen ===
Yemen has a permissive gun policy and does not require permits for firearm ownership. The 1992 Law "On Regulating Carrying Firearms and Ammunitions and Their Trade", established the right to own firearms (rifles, machine guns, revolvers and hunting rifles) for the purpose of legitimate defense. Licenses are required to carry firearms in cities, which are issued on a may-issue basis with varying restrictions depending on the city. Open and concealed carry is unrestricted in rural areas. Since the breakout of the civil war in 2011 there has been barely any state gun control, and fully-automatic rifles/assault rifles, anti-tank guided missiles or armored vehicles are available over the counter for various militias and individuals willing to buy them.

According to the Small Arms Survey of 2018 titled Estimating Global Civilian-Held Firearms Numbers, there are roughly 14.9 million civilian-held firearms in Yemen (52.8 firearms held per 100 residents), making Yemen the second most armed country in the world after the United States.

== Europe ==
Issuing of concealed carry permit in Europe (by country, 2019): shall-issue may-issue permissive may-issue may-issue restricted (no-issue in practice) no-issue no data

=== Bosnia and Herzegovina ===
In Bosnia and Herzegovina, its two autonomous entities, the Federation of Bosnia and Herzegovina and Republika Srpska have relatively strict weapon laws compared to the rest of Europe. Weapons are regulated by the Weapons and Ammunition Law. People over 21 may apply for a permit. Those with a history of criminal activity, mental disorders, alcohol or substance use will be denied a permit. There is also a thorough background check, interviewing neighbors and family, and the applicant must complete a course and pass a multiple-choice exam. Police have the last word on the matter, with an appeal possible to a police captain. Firearms must be kept in a "safe place" within a residence, and may be confiscated by police if the owner is found to be "irresponsible". Concealed carry is allowed with a permit. Pepper spray may be carried by females if registered with police.

=== European Union & European Free Trade Association ===
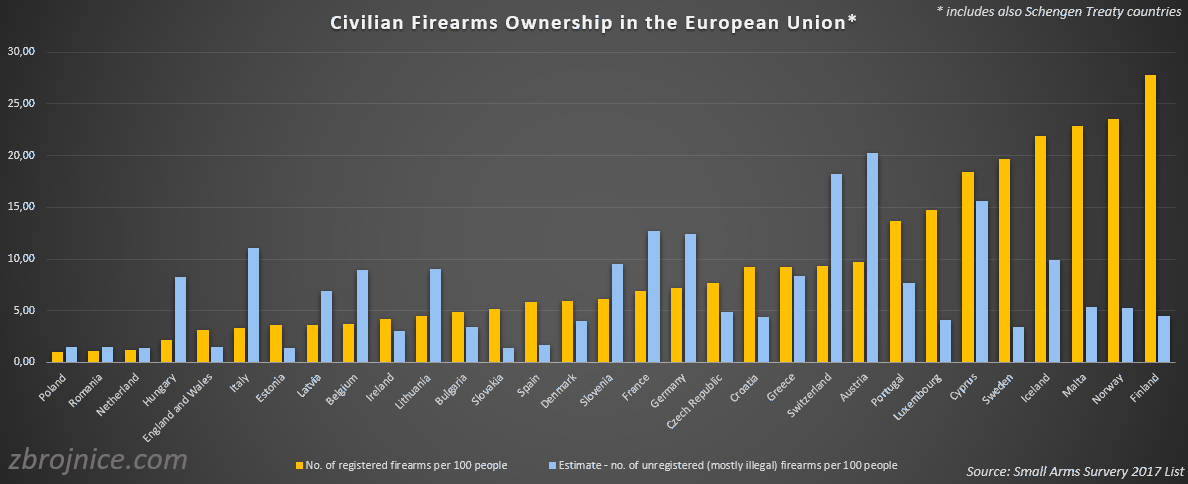
Number of firearms in population of EU countries – per 100 people

Gun laws in the European Union and EFTA vary greatly from one country to another. Nevertheless, two main strains may be recognized: Most countries treat firearms primarily as sporting instruments, while a select group of countries consider them to be primarily tools of individual or collective safety (i.e. Austria, the Czech Republic, Poland, Baltic states, Finland). This difference in primary understanding of firearms' main purpose leads to different treatment in national legislations.

All EU and EFTA countries are bound to implement Directive (EU) 2021/555 into their own legal systems. The Directive sets certain gun control standards that the countries must meet; at the same time national legislators may choose to adopt more stringent rules.

Under the directive, firearms are defined as any portable barrelled weapon that expels, is designed to expel or may be converted to expel a shot, bullet or projectile by the action of a combustible propellant.

Since 2017 EU directive amendment, arms are classified in three EU categories:

- Category A – Prohibited firearms: including, for instance, explosive military missiles and launchers, automatic firearms, firearms disguised as other objects, or ammunition with penetrating, explosive or incendiary projectiles, and the projectiles for such ammunition, or semi-automatic firearms;
- Category B – Firearms subject to authorisation, including, for instance, various kind of repeating and semi-automatic long firearms, but excluding those which belongs to category A
- Category C – Firearms and weapons subject to declaration, including various kind of long firearms with, but excluding those which belongs to category A or B

Under article 5 of the directive:

Without prejudice to Article 3, Member States shall permit the acquisition and possession of firearms only by persons who have good cause and who:

- (a) are at least 18 years of age, (...)
- (b) are not likely to be a danger to themselves or others, to public order or to public safety; the fact of having been convicted of a violent intentional crime shall be considered as indicative of such danger.

(...)

==== Austria ====
Austria is the only country in the European Union where firearms are only partially licensed; the Waffengesetz (Weapons Act) provides the legal terms for all types of weapons, including firearms. § 1 of the law defines Weapons as objects that are designed to directly eliminate or reduce the ability of people to attack or defend themselves (e.g. knives, pepper spray, gas pistols, etc.) or for firing projectiles during hunting or sport shooting (e.g. crossbows, bows, etc.). § 2 further defines Firearms as weapons where projectiles can be fired from a barrel in a predefined direction. Most common firearms and some other weapons fall into three different categories, which come with different restrictions:

Category A is divided into two subcategories "war material" and "restricted weapons". "War material" includes for example tanks, fully automatic weapons and armour-piercing weapons; "restricted weapons" includes weapons disguised as other objects, firearms which can be disassembled in a faster than usual fashion for hunting and sport, shotguns with an overall length of less than 90 cm (35 in) or barrel length shorter than 45 cm (18 in), pump action shotguns, suppressors and firearms with suppressors, knuckledusters, blackjacks, steel rods. Category B covers all handguns, repeating shotguns and semi-automatic weapons which are not category A (e.g. pistols, revolvers, semi-automatic rifles and semi-automatic shotguns). Category C includes most other firearms that are not category A or B (e.g. repeating rifles, revolving rifles, break-action rifles and break-action shotguns).

All firearms of category A, B, and C are registered in the central weapon register (Zentrales Waffenregister, or short ZWR). Firearms of category C are the least restricted; all citizens over 18 may purchase them at licensed sellers, even without a firearms licence (barring a 3-day waiting period to check for a weapon ban on the buyer). Category B weapons have further restrictions; buyers must have a firearms license or a carry permit, and be 21, unless granted an exception for the age of 18. Category A weapons typically require further exceptions to be granted for holders, except in the case of suppressors and suppressed weapons, which may be held by those with valid hunting licences without an additional permit. "War material" requires a further special federal permit, which is in practice only granted to approved collectors and experts. In general, ammunition sales are unrestricted, though handgun ammunition and some rifle ammunition requires a permit. Antique firearms made before 1871, many black powder firearms and some other "less effective weapons" also require no licence or registration.

In addition, § 11a defines further restrictions on the purchase, possession and carrying of all weapons and ammunition for asylum seekers and many third-country nationals. Owning weapons without a permit for them is strictly prohibited and controlled by the police.

Carrying firearms in public generally requires a carry permit (or "Waffenpass"). Carry permits are issued by the authorities on a shall issue or may issue basis, depending on reason and applicant. Austrian law makes no distinction between concealed or open carry; with a carry permit, the holder may carry their weapon(s) freely throughout the whole country and even in certain "weapon free zones". However, holders must carry their weapons in a way that does not constitute a public nuisance; for example, openly displaying a handgun in one's belt at the cinema while wearing civil clothing would be considered unusual and could be considered a public nuisance if the police were called.

==== Belgium ====
Possessing or carrying firearms is generally illegal in Belgium with very limited exemptions. Gun laws in Belgium are among the strictest in the world. An exception is made for people who have a valid firearms license. Since 2006, after a 2006 Antwerp shooting, there are very strict conditions and rules for gun owners to obtain such a licence. The legal reasons to get a license include sport shooting, hunting, collecting and self-defense, although self-defense licenses are almost never approved. The granting of gun permits is the responsibility of the governor of the province in which the applicant resides. Applicants must always pass a theoretical and practical exam, have a clean criminal record and be able to present a medical certificate proving that they are competent to handle weapons.

When purchasing a gun, in most cases a permit called 'Model 4' has to be requested first, even when you already have a license, in order to register the firearm. The requisition of such a permit has a cost of around €140 (as of February 2025) and is increased every year, as well as a waiting period of up to 4 months. There are exceptions to this rule however, but these are different depending on the reason for the possession of the firearm. I.e.: a .22LR semi automatic pistol is exempt from a model 4 permit for sport shooters, but not for hunters. All revolvers, centerfire pistols, semi-automatic rifles and pump action shotguns always require a Model 4 permit. When requesting a Model 4 you have to be able to prove that you passed the forementioned theoretical and practical exam, have a clean criminal record, present a medical certificate, provide proof that you are a member of a licensed shooting range, and get written permission by every adult person whom you share a house with that they do not object to you having the firearms.

However, the laws and regulations concerning the carrying and possession of firearms for hunters, sport shooters, collectors and also for the import and export of guns, differs slightly from area to area in Belgium; a valid licence is almost always required. Airsoft guns, paintball guns and some blank guns do not need a permit or licence and are free to purchase. Deactivated guns also need a license as of 2019. The only firearms that can be bought without a license in Belgium are those which are manufactured before 1890, or those that only use black powder and were patented before 1895 and manufactured before 1945. The possession of ammunition is always restricted to people who have a valid license. Belgium is the only country in the EU where magazines are also subject to license and registration.

Gun laws in Belgium do not apply (or at least applies differently) for the military and law enforcement services such as the police. Until its abolition in 2019, the security units of Belgian courts and prison transport (Corps de securité Justice/Veiligheidskorps Justitie) were also permitted to carry handguns.

Because of the very strict laws, and the long and expensive process of obtaining licenses, Belgian law allows for people over the age of 18 without a license to shoot once per year and only under strict supervision in a licensed shooting range.

==== Croatia ====
Croatia issues firearms permits for self-defense, hunting, sport shooting:

- Hunting permits require a certificate indicating successfully passing the hunting exam;
- Sporting permits require a certificate issued by a target shooting organization on active membership;
- Self-defense permits require a proof of danger to life.

Every permit also requires an applicant to be at least 18 years old, not be convicted of crimes, there being no other circumstances indicating that the weapon may be abused (for example by a history of alcoholism) and passing medical examinations.

As of October 2020 there 99,829 legal gun owners in Croatia. 14,711 people can own and carry firearms for the purpose of personal safety.

==== Cyprus ====
The Republic of Cyprus has strict gun control. Private citizens are completely forbidden from owning handguns and rifles in any calibre, including .22 rimfire ammunition. Shotguns limited to two rounds are allowed with a license, issued by provincial police. Shotguns must be for hunting purposes, and a licensed citizen may own up to ten shotguns, typically double-barrelled. A firearm license is required to buy ammunition, of up to 250 shells per purchase, with sales being recorded. Cyprus also controls airguns, and airgun owners require a license. Even though purchasing automatic weapons is illegal, the military issues their reserves an automatic weapon, therefore the majority of the male population has one due to military conscription.

==== Czech Republic ====
Gun safes for visitors at a Czech courthouse

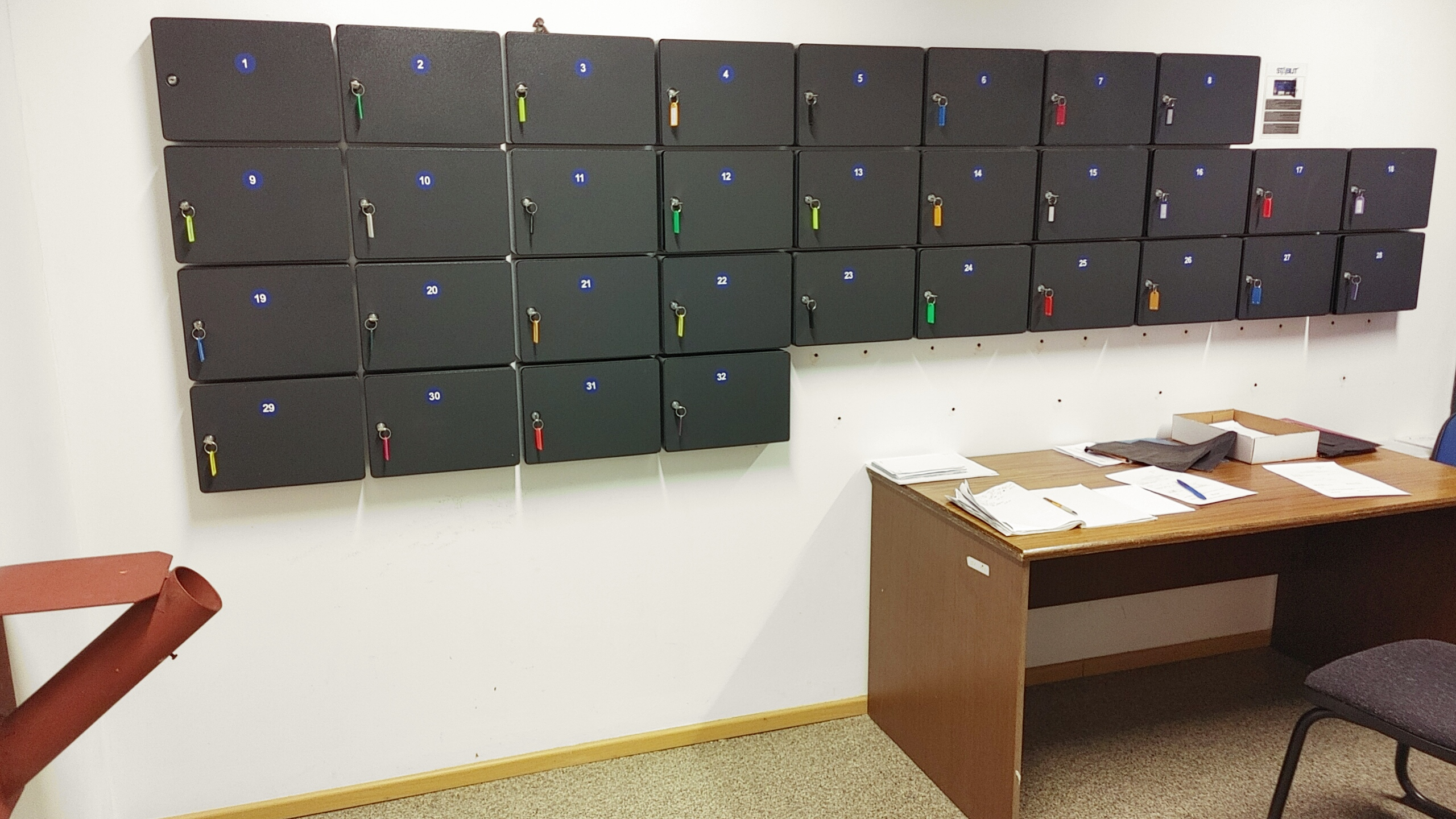
Gun safes for civilian firearms at a courthouse in Prague. It is forbidden to carry any weapons within a courthouse. Visitors can leave their firearms at gun safes upon entry, before undergoing airport-style security check.

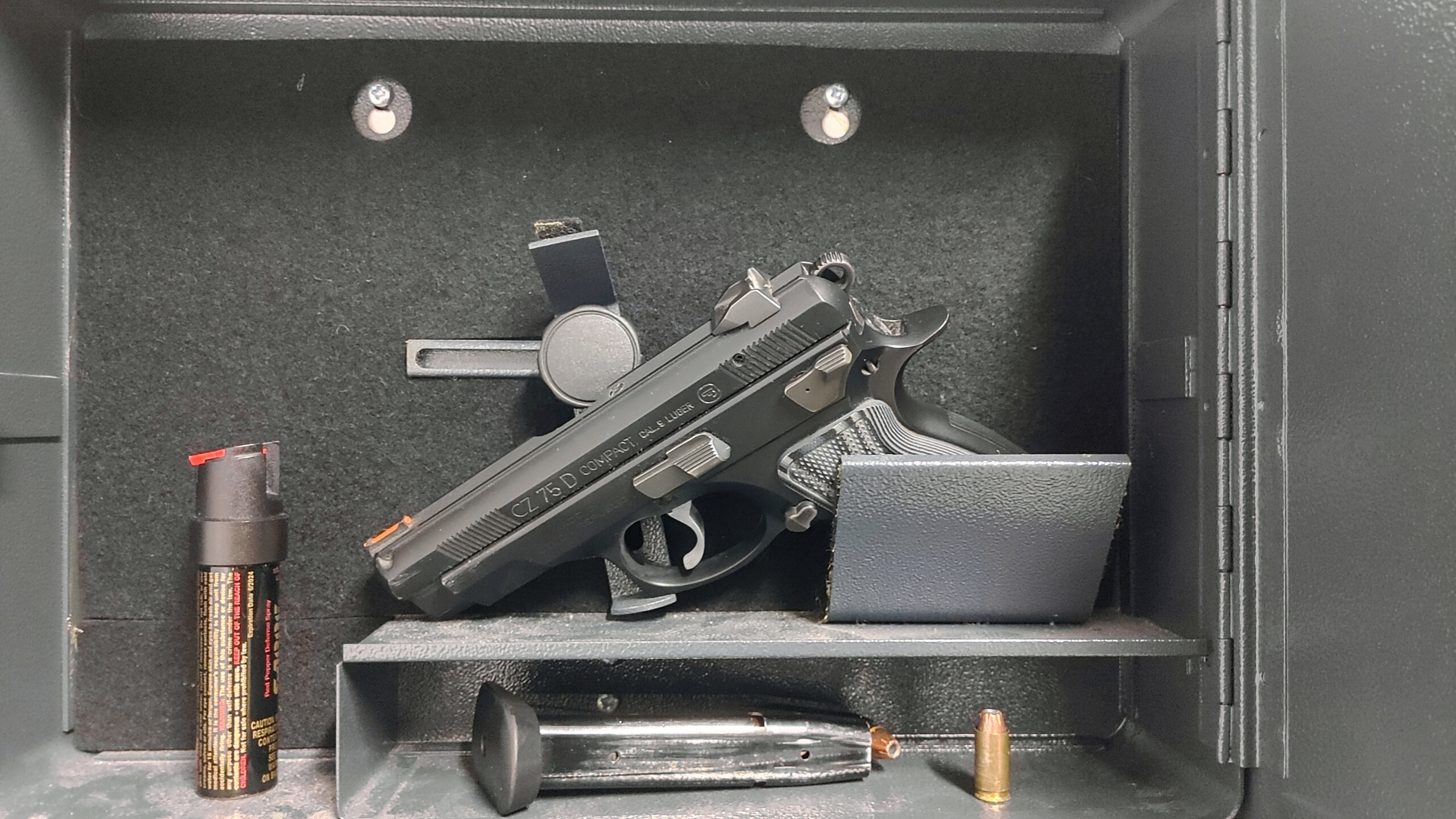
Visitor's unloaded pistol and a pepper spray within a courthouse gun safe

Gun laws in the Czech Republic adhere to the European Firearms Directive. Legal accessibility is comparable to those EU and EFTA countries which consider firearms to be primarily tools of individual or collective safety (i.e. Switzerland, Austria, Poland, Baltic states, Finland) and not just sporting instruments.

Right to keep and bear arms is considered to be an attribute of liberty in the country. It is explicitly recognized in the first Article of the Firearms Act. At the constitutional level, the Charter of Fundamental Rights and Freedoms protects the "right to defend one's own life or life of another person also with arms under conditions stipulated by law".

Firearms are available to any resident subject to acquiring a firearms authorization. Firearm authorizations may be obtained in a way similar to a driving license; by passing a proficiency exam (in Czech language only), medical examination and having clear criminal record. Unlike in most other European countries, Czech firearms legislation also permits citizens to carry concealed weapons for self-defense; 260,027 out of 316,859 gun owners were authorized to carry a concealed firearm by 31 December 2023. The most common reason for firearm possession by Czech gun owners is protection, with hunting and sport shooting being less common. Additionally, people can join government endorsed advanced shooting training courses with their privately owned firearms and become members of the militia-style Designated Reserves.

The beginnings of Czech civilian firearms possession date back to 1421, with the first use of firearms as the primary weapons of the Hussites. Firearms became indispensable tools for the mostly-commoner militia in a war for religious freedom and political independence. Firearms possession became common throughout and after the Hussite wars. The universal right to keep arms for "all people of all standing" was formally affirmed in the 1517 St. Wenceslaus Agreement. Throughout its 600-year history, Czech firearms legislation remained permissive, with the exception of the periods of German Nazi occupation and of the Communist regime.

The English term pistol originated in 15th-century Czech language. Mariánská skála in Ústí nad Labem is Europe's oldest continually-open shooting range, established in 1617.

==== Denmark ====
Civilians in Denmark aged 16 and above can acquire gun licenses for hunting or sport shooting. This requires passing a written multiple-choice test and a practical test, after which a certified hunting license instructor determines if the applicant is suitable to own a weapon. A license is usually provided if the applicant has no or only minor marks on their criminal record.

A hunting license permits the over-the-counter-purchase and ownership of an unlimited number of shotguns up to 12 gauge. These shotguns may have a capacity of up to two rounds when used for hunting in Denmark, and up to ten rounds when used for training or for hunting outside Denmark. From there, the police has to be notified of new weapon purchases through an online form. Bolt-action rifles can also be bought over-the-counter, although they require a rifle license which is obtained through the police. The allowed calibers range from the smallest possible, up to .50 BMG, with .50 BMG not included. Semi-automatic rifles are permitted under the same conditions capacity limits as shotguns: they must be limited to two rounds when used for hunting in Denmark, and may have a capacity of up to ten rounds when used for training or for hunting outside Denmark. Currently, semi-automatic rifles for hunting are only approved in larger calibers (such as .308 Winchester, 6.5 × 55, and .300 Winchester Magnum etc.), as they must meet the legal requirements for Class 1 game (e.g., fallow deer, wild boar, and red deer). These require a minimum bullet diameter of 6 mm (.236″) and an impact energy (E100) of at least 2000 joules. As a result, smaller calibers such as .223 Remington / 5.56 × 45 are generally not approved. The hunter must pass a shotgun or rifle shooting test before being allowed to hunt.

For sport-shooting purposes, shotguns may also be used, as well as bolt-action rifles with calibers up to—but not including—.50 BMG. Sporting rifles are often chambered in .22 LR and 6.5 × 55 mm. Semi-automatic rifles are not allowed for sports shooting.

Handguns: After two years of active membership in a shooting club, one can apply for a handgun permit which is then subject to background checks and approval by the police, and one has to be 20 years old. Approved calibers: All calibers under 9mm (9 × 19, .38 special, .357 magnum, .32 ACP, etc.), plus a limited number of larger calibers; .40 S&W, .45 ACP, .44 special. The maximum number of handguns are six in .22 caliber. When applying for a third gun, a special permit from the department of justice is required. Large caliber guns, i.e. bigger than .22 caliber, are restricted to a maximum of two in the same caliber. Therefore, one can only own two handguns in 9 mm at any given time. However, it is legal to own an additional two handguns in 9 mm, if these are revolvers. For all handguns, the overall length must be at least 210 millimetres (8.3 in), regardless of caliber, measured without orthopedic grips or removal parts.

A weapon permit for sporting purposes (both long and short firearms) has to be renewed every five years. Rifle permits for hunting rifles have to be renewed every 10 years. Shotguns are not held on individual permits; holders are allowed to own these as long as they have a valid hunting license – and they can keep it for up to 10 years after the hunting license expires – albeit they are not allowed to keep ammunition without a valid license.

Under Danish firearms law, sole weapons are classified as particularly dangerous (særligt farlige våben), these include pistols and revolvers, as well as semi- and fully-automatic firearms; to acquire or possess these firearms, individuals must be at least 20 years old and be assessed as “particularly reliable” (særlig pålidelig) by the authorities, although licensed hunters are exempt from the age requirement when acquiring semi-auto shotguns.

Carrying a firearm in public is strictly prohibited, however, a notion of proportionate self-defense exists. A person may use necessary and proportionate force to defend themselves against an imminent threat of serious harm; in extreme cases, this may include lethal force if no lesser means would suffice (for example, using a firearm when faced with an immediate threat of death or serious injury).

Fully automatic weapons are prohibited for civilian use, unless a special permit is issued by the Ministry of Justice. These permits are extremely rare and are typically granted only to individuals or companies working with or supplying the police or military.

Members of the Danish Home Guard may, under specific conditions, store issued service weapons (fully automatic) at home; however, such weapons remain under military control and are not considered privately owned.

Illegal possession of a firearm may be punished with imprisonment of no less than one year. Civilians may keep privately owned weapons including pistols, revolvers, shotguns and rifles at their residences. These, together with its ammunition have to be stored in an approved gun cabinet (EN1143-1 grade 0 or better). The police may inspect a shooting club's weapons at their discretion, but require a court order to inspect privately held firearms.

==== Estonia ====
Estonia is a shall-issue nation. Background checks, doctor's approval, written and practical exam and a firearms course are required. The courses are only offered by private parties (not law enforcement) and must be performed in Estonian as must be the national exam given by law enforcement. Earlier, a translator was permitted, but it was changed as a consequence of the 2022 Russian invasion of Ukraine due to the large number of ethnic Russians applying for licenses. After the national exam is passed, the taking of which already requires passing the previous requisites, a license must be issued on request with law enforcement having no final say afterwards unless a later cause (like committing a felony) invalidates a license.

==== Finland ====
The ownership and use of firearms in Finland is regulated by the country's Firearms Act of 1998. Weapons are individually licensed by local police, with no limit on the number of licenses an individual may hold. Licenses are granted for recreational uses, exhibition or (under certain circumstances) professional use. No type of weapon is explicitly prohibited, but licenses are granted only for a reason. Self-defense is not accepted as a valid reason for licensing. In general, this excludes all but hunting and sports guns from non-professional use. Fully automatic weapons are generally not permitted. With the exception of law enforcement, only specially trained security guards may carry loaded weapons in public.

In 2007, Finland had the third largest gun-ownership rate globally (behind the US and Yemen), and the first in Europe. As of 2007, there were 1.6 million registered weapons and 650,000 people with firearm permits in the country, i.e. 12% of the population. In November that year, Finland updated their gun laws after two school shootings that left 20 people dead, and to comply with an EU directive by removing the ability of 15-18-year-olds to have their own permit. The possibility of creating a dual-license for an already licensed weapon with permission of the license holder was allowed (e.g. parental permission). In 2011, a constitutional law committee concluded that people over the age of 20 can receive a permit for semi-automatic handguns; individuals must demonstrate continuous activity in handgun sporting group for two years prior.

==== France ====
In 1563, Charles IX of France had an address to the Rouen parliament about forbidding firearms in which he made the following statement:

French

D'auantage cõſiderant que les meurtres, volleries, aſſaſſinats, & autres entreprinſes, qui troublent le commun repos de nosdicts ſubects, s'exercent plus par les armes à feu, que nuls aultres : Défendons treſeſtroictement sur meſmes peines à toutes personnes, de quelque eſtat, dignité & qualité qu'ils ſoyent, porter ne faire porter par leurs gens & ſeruiteurs dedans les villes, ne par les champs, aucune hacquebute, piſtolle ne piſtolet, ne d'icelles tirer: ſinon (...).

English

Considering murders, robberies, killings & other enterprises, which disturb regular rest of ours subjects, are more exercised by firearms than any others: We forbid very strictly with same punishment for everybody, of any state, dignity & quality they are, to carry or make carry by their people & servitors neither within any town, nor in the countryside, any hacquebute, pistol nor pistolet, nor to use them: except (...)

In France, a hunting license or a sport-shooting license is needed to purchase any smokeless powder firearm. In September 2015, firearms were divided into four categories that determine the regulations that apply to their possession and use. Category D arms include black powder firearms designed before 1900 and compressed air arms developing between 2 and 20 joules, they can be purchased by any citizen over the age of 18. Category C firearms can be obtained with a hunting license, or sport-shooting license with a medical certificate. Category C includes mainly single-shot-per-barrel shotguns and single-shot or manual repeating rifles (including centre-fire rifles, for hunting or target shooting). Once legally purchased these category C arms may be kept, without using them, even when no longer licensed for hunting or sport-shooting.

Category B firearms are only available to sport-shooters licensed for at least 6 months, with a medical certificate, without any felony convictions, and additionally requires at least three shooting sessions with an instructor each separated by 2 months. Specific authorisations for purchase and possession may then be sought from a local police administration, are valid for 5 years, and are renewable. Such weapons may then only be used for sport-shooting at shooting ranges, never for hunting. Category B includes all assault type rifles, such as AK-47/AKM, AK-74 or AR-15/M16/M4, and any look-alike weapons even when chambered for rimfire cartridges (.22 LR). These must be semi-automatic only. All handguns, including those using rimfire ammunition, are classed as category B. It is illegal to possess these category B weapons after expiry of a non-renewed specific authorisation: the arms must be disposed of (sold to a gun shop or else destroyed, for example). Authorisations can also be revoked at any time by any of the parties involved in the authorisations delivery (Government, Prefecture, Police).

Air-guns including pistols are freely available to adults, as category D arms, provided that their energy level does not exceed 20 J (previously 10 J). Typical energy levels are 6 J for a target pistol and 7.5 J for a target rifle. A scoped Field Target rifle might produce 15 or 16 J (maximum authorised in FT competition). Air-soft arms, firing non-metallic pellets and not exceeding 2 J energy, are considered to be toys, rather than weapons, and so are excluded from firearm regulations.

Also freely available are category D defensive pepper sprays up to a maximum 75 g capacity. Bigger capacity sprays are considered offensive weapons, not defensive, and so are classed in category B, and require specific authorisation.

A person cannot own more than 12 centerfire firearms, and cannot own more than 10 magazines and 1,000 rounds of ammunition per firearm. A one-year carry license may be issued for persons "exposed to exceptional risks to their life" allowing them to carry a handgun with a maximum of 50 rounds. Such authorizations are extremely rare, however, as the state would normally insist on providing police protection in such cases. Since November 2015, police officers are authorised to carry their service weapons whilst off-duty.

==== Germany ====
Gun ownership in Germany is restrictive, being regulated by the Federal Weapons Act (German: Waffengesetz) of 1972. The laws apply to weapons with a fire energy exceeding 7.5 J. A firearms license may be granted to those over the age of 18 who have no criminal convictions or mental disability, who are deemed reliable and can justify a reason for owning a firearm. A separate license is required for each firearm owned. Target-shooters must have been a member of a shooting club with 18 recorded visits in the previous 12 months. A firearms carry permit is a second-tier license which allows concealed carrying in public, and is only issued to those with a particular need.

Several weapons and special ammunitions are completely prohibited, such as automatic firearms. Buying, possessing, lending, using, carrying, crafting, altering and the trading of these weapons is illegal and punishable by up to five years imprisonment, confiscation of the weapon and a fine of up to €10,000. Using an illegal weapon for crimes of any kind is punishable by 1–10 years imprisonment.

Germany's National Gun Registry, introduced at the end of 2012, counted 5.5 million firearms legally owned by 1.4 million people.

==== Greece ====
Greece has gun regulations in place. Shotguns (limited to a 3-round capacity), rifles and handguns require a license issued by Police Headquarters. A license may be issued to a Greek citizen over the age of 18 if: a) there are serious fears about his or her personal security along with a positive recommendation by the Prosecutor and b) it is required for the safety of shops, banks, other financial institutions, etc. To purchase handguns and rifles, citizens must either have a concealed-carry permit or a target-shooting permit (for rifles and pistols). Semi auto rifles are not prohibited since the beginning of 2023. Hunters can own up to 10 shotguns and rifles (with no gun barrel rifling) and sport shooters can own up to 8 guns. There is no license-check or record kept for ammunition purchases for shotguns but target shooters can only own 1000 rounds per weapon, 3500 in total.

==== Hungary ====
Gun laws in Hungary are relatively strict, regulated by Code 24/2004, governmental decision 253/2004. (VIII. 31.) and directive of the Minister of Internal Affairs 49/2004. The law defines a firearm as having muzzle energy that exceeds 7.5 joules (5.5 ft⋅lbf). A firearms license may be granted to those over the age of 18 who have no criminal convictions or mental disability, and have passed a basic firearms theory/practical examination. Three categories of firearms ownership are allowed: Hunting (Firearms restricted to bolt action rifles and double barrel shotguns), Sports shooting (only restriction is no fully automatic firearms), Self defense (special permission from the Police, very rarely granted in special cases e.g. gun shop owners). Sports shooting has in recent years gained popularity with the number of sports category licenses being issued steadily climbing. Government initiatives to popularize shooting sports such as building shooting ranges and introducing shooting as a sport in the schooling system has slowly begun. It is generally expected that obtaining (and keeping) a firearms permit is a slow and somewhat costly process, but once a permit is granted and the necessary yearly memberships are paid, yearly doctors certificates are obtained and the mandatory 2–3 sporting events are attended (for sports shooter) ownership is fairly liberal as to the type of firearm one can own.

In 2010, there were 129,000 registered gun owners (1.3% of the population) in Hungary with 235,000 firearms. The majority of these were hunting rifles. Gun violence is very rare in Hungary. Crime with firearms is very rare and this statistic usually includes crimes committed with non-lethal "pepper spray" guns. Police use lethal force with a firearm less than 10 times per year, on average.

==== Iceland ====
In Iceland, a license is required to own or possess firearms. A national government safety course must be passed before applying for a license. A special license is required to own a handgun, which may only be used for target shooting at a licensed range. Semi-automatic firearms have caliber restrictions, while fully automatic firearms are only permitted for collectors.

Applicants must sit through a mandatory four-hour lecture on the "history and physics of the firearm". Paperwork must be filed in the police, magistrate, and the Environment Agency of Iceland. Applicants need to prove clean criminal records, need to be evaluated by a doctor to prove they "are of sound mind" and have "good enough eyesight". Two books referring to guns must be bought and read, a three-day course must be attended, and the applicant should score at least 75% on exams concerning gun safety, management, "what animals are allowed to be hunted and when. Finally, a practical exam must be taken. After Icelanders have their license, they need to own a gun safe to store the weapons in, plus a separate place to store the ammunition".

Approximately one gun is owned for every three people in the country, being used mostly for hunting and competitive shooting. From January to July 2019, 394 shotguns, 785 rifles, and 208 handguns were registered in Iceland. In total, police counts for guns in Iceland include about 40,000 shotguns, 25,000 rifles, and 3,600 handguns as of July that year.

==== Ireland ====
Gun laws in Ireland are strict, requiring all firearms to be licensed individually through the Gardaí (police). Applicants must be 16 years of age and have a good reason for ownership, a secure location to store firearms, proof of competency with the firearm or arrangements to achieve such, provide access to medical records and two character references, and be of sound mind and temperate habits. Applicants convicted of certain specified offenses will be denied a firearms certificate. Personal protection is not a valid reason for ownership.

Irish firearms law is based on the Firearms Act 1925, which was amended by several following acts in 1964, 1968, 1971, 1990, 1998 and 2000. The cumulative effect of these modifications, along with modifications in other acts and confusion over which amendments applied, resulted in a 2006 Irish Law Reform Commission recommendation that all extant legislation be restated (written in a single document with all prior Acts repealed). However, the Criminal Justice Act 2006, contained a rewriting of almost 80% of the Firearms Act. It was quickly followed by amendments in 2007 and further major amendments in 2009, exacerbating the legislative confusion. As of 2014, the Law Reform Commission recommendation has not as yet been fully enacted; the Firearms Act consists of the initial 1925 Act amended by approximately twenty separate Acts and is well understood by only a handful of those directly involved in its drafting, amendment or usage. Extensive complaints have arisen over the application of the legislation, with several hundred judicial review cases won in the High Court and Supreme Court by firearms owners, all relating to licensing decisions which had not adhered to the Firearms Act.

==== Italy ====
In Italy, national police issues gun licenses to those over the age of 18 without criminal record, who are not mentally ill or known to use illicit substances, and who can prove competence with firearm safety. A shooting sports license allows to transport unloaded firearms and firing them in designated shooting ranges. A hunting license allows holders to engage in hunting with firearms. A concealed carry license allows a person to carry a loaded firearm in public, and requires proving a "valid reason" to do so (e.g. a security guard or a jeweller at risk of robbery). All weapons must be registered within 72 hours from the moment of purchase. The number of firearms an individual may own and retain at the place declared during registration is limited to:

- Unlimited weapons suitable for hunting. These are defined as smoothbore or rifled firearms having a barrel length of at least 30 centimetres and a total length of at least 60 centimetres. In the case of smoothbores the caliber must not be greater than 12 gauge, while in the case of rifles it must not be smaller than 5.6 millimetres measured between the lands, with a casing length no shorter than 40 millimetres if the caliber is exactly equal to 5.6 millimetres.
- Twelve long or short firearms classified as suited for shooting sports by the Italian national proof house at the request of a sport association federated with the Italian Olympic Committee (CONI).
- Three weapons whose characteristics do not make them suitable for hunting and that have not been classified as suitable for sporting.
- Eight antique firearms (manufactured before 1890).
- An unlimited quantity of single shot muzzle-loading functioning replicas of firearms built before 1890.
- Unlimited quantity of Moderate Offensive Capacity (<7,5 Joule) air guns.

The last two can be purchased in an authorized firearm shop by anyone who can prove to be at least 18 years old, without the need for a license. The carrying of such weapons is forbidden without a licence and no registration is required (Art. 7 c.4 DM 362/2001). These limits can be exceeded with a collector license.

Ammunition: any licence allows the owner to keep 200 rounds of handgun and 1500 rounds of hunting ammunition or up to 5 kg of gunpowder (smokeless or black) to handload cartridges. Registration is required within 72 hours from acquisition for all ammunition and powder. Registration is not to be repeated if ammunition and powder are used and then bought again, unless the original quantity registered is being exceeded with the new purchase. Smoothbore cartridges not loaded with slugs but instead with shot (regardless of its size) can be owned without registration if the number possessed is inferior to one thousand.

==== Luxembourg ====
In Luxembourg, anyone wishing to purchase, possess or use a firearm must hold a permit issued by the Minister of Justice in person.

The most common reasons for applying for a permit are hunting, recreational shooting, weapons collecting, and inheriting a firearm. Anyone who inherits a firearm must have a permit even if they have no intention to ever touch or use the gun.

Self-defence is not a valid reason for owning a firearm. However, the Ministry of Justice is concerned that some permit holders falsely cite another reason (such as recreational shooting) as a justification for acquiring their permit when their sole actual motivation is self-defence.

==== Malta ====
Firearms are allowed in Malta for sport shooting, collection and hunting purposes. To get firearm license one must join a shooting or collectors club for training, which will issue a recommendation letter for the police, after which applicant must pass knowledge of firearm safety and the Arms Act. After successfully completing every step one will get license.

There are 102,610 registered firearms (or 22 per 100 people), including 56,000 shotguns, 10,553 pistols, 7,856 rifles, 5,369 revolvers, 501 machine guns, 477 sub-machine guns, 633 combat shotguns, 22 cannons, 7 humane killers and 2 rocket launchers.

Law allow carrying firearms while hunting, with 10,544 licensed to do so on land and 247 on sea. Carrying loaded firearms outside of hunting grounds or shooting range is illegal. Automatic firearms are allowed only if they were produced before 1946.

==== Netherlands ====
In the Netherlands, gun ownership is restricted to hunters, collectors and target shooters. People with felonies, drug addictions, and mental illnesses may not possess firearms. To be a collector one has to limit oneself to a specific area of expertise and demonstrate a serious and thorough knowledge of that area, for instance through publications or lectures.

Once obtained, firearms must be stored in a safe and are inspected annually by the police (every 3 years when over 25). Legally owned firearms may only be used in self-defence as a last resort.

==== Norway ====
Firearm ownership in Norway is controlled by laws passed by the Norwegian Parliament, with further regulations passed by the Ministry of Justice and Public Security. The National Police Directorate can issue government circulars with further in depth definition of how the firearm regulations should be interpreted (by the police).

The Norwegian police can issue firearms licenses to those with a hunting license or members of a sports shooting club. They can also issue licenses to Norwegian historical weapons society collectors, museums, international ship and port facility security and more.

Hunters can own up to 8 firearms, and sports shooters can own up to two firearms per approved shooting disciplines as defined by The National Police Directorate. The purchase of ammunition is restricted to those with a valid firearms license for any given calibre.

Long guns must have a minimum barrel length of 40 centimetres and an overall length of 84 centimetres when operable. Rifles are restricted to 10-round magazines, shotguns to 5 rounds, and pistols to 20 rounds per default. Detachable box magazines for semi-automatic shotguns are prohibited.

Hunters can own semi-automatic and manually loaded rifles and shotguns. Semi-automatic rifles for hunting shall only accept detachable 10-round magazines or smaller ones. They must also have the visual appearance of a "hunting rifle" (i.e. no detachable pistol-grip, or handguard that covers the top half of the barrel).

Sports shooters can own semi-automatic and manually loaded rifles, shotguns and pistols. Sports shooters can apply for unrestricted magazine capacity for each firearm used in an approved sports shooting discipline. However, in practice, it is only approved for rifles and pistols.

Civilians are not permitted to transport/carry firearms loaded or in a manner that allows for easy access in public places, effectively prohibiting any form of concealed or open-carrying of firearms. Moreover, self-defence is not a valid reason for having a firearms licence issued. Firearms licences are only issued for hunting and sporting (or other speciality purposes not generally applicable to ordinary civilians).

==== Poland ====
Gun ownership in Poland is regulated by the Weapons and Munitions Act of 1999 as further amended. A permit is required to own or possess firearms. Permits are granted for specific purposes, such as self-defense, sport, hunting, collecting etc. and are shall issue except the ones for self-defense, which are may issue. Institutional permits allow for firearm ownership by private security companies, shooting ranges, sport clubs etc.

Permits are issued to permanent residents over 21, not addicted to alcohol or other substances, having no criminal record, being in good physical and mental health, who passed an exam before sporting association, hunting association or the Police. Permits specify the purposes, categories and quantities of allowed guns; categories depend on permit purpose while quantities are assigned at the discretion of the Police, based on documentation provided. Quantities can be increased when one uses up all available slots.

Carrying loaded guns is allowed on all types of permits except permits for collecting and memorial purposes. Hunters can carry loaded only on hunting grounds. Guns shall be carried concealed in a holster close to the body. Carrying in public transport is limited only to self-defense permit holders. It is prohibited to carry while intoxicated, and when attending public gatherings or mass events.

Everyone, including foreigners, is allowed to use legal guns at registered shooting ranges, regardless of actual gun's ownership, e.g. rented from the range or shared by a legal owner present. Discharging a firearm for training or leisure out of a registered shooting range (even on a large private property) is prohibited.

Full-auto or select-fire firearms are permitted only on institutional and training permits. Since 2020 the Police can issue permits for firearms with suppressors for hunting, but only to be used for sanitary shootings, see main article for details. Armor-piercing, incendiary, tracer and other special ammunition is banned. Only valid permit holders are allowed to buy or possess live ammunition, and only of the types exactly matching the guns they legally own. The quantity of matching ammunition in possession is not limited. Hunters, collectors and sport shooters are allowed to manufacture (reload) ammunition, but strictly for their own use. There are further limits regarding allowed types and calibers depending on the purpose of the permit – see main article for details. There are no limits of magazine capacity, except when hunting.

Replicas of cartridgeless black powder firearms designed before 1885 require no permit to own. However, a separate bill of law allows businesses to sell black powder to licensed customers only. This is often circumvented by obtaining a European Firearms Pass for a black powder firearm, asking a licensed colleague (there are no restrictions of private sale or just giving out of black powder) or by buying powder in neighboring countries, mostly the Czech Republic.

Air guns up to 17 Joules of muzzle energy are unregulated. Air guns above that limit are considered pneumatic weapons, no permit is required but the owner has to be 18 and has to pass medical and psychological evaluation as for firearms permit; guns must be registered with the Police and may be used only on registered shooting ranges. Use of pneumatic weapons outside of shooting range is considered the same kind of offense as using firearms.

Some other weapons are restricted and require a permit, such as electroshock weapons with mean current greater than 10 mA, large pepper spray dispensers, crossbows, specific kinds of batons, brass knuckles and nunchakus, however ban on nuchakus is not enforced.

Commercial manufacture of and trade in certain weapons and ammunition are subject to a separate licensing regime in Poland. A concession is required for the manufacture of or trade in categories of explosives, weapons, ammunition, and products and technology intended for military or police use specified by Polish law.

==== Romania ====
Gun ownership in Romania is regulated by Law 295/2004. Romania has one of the toughest gun ownership laws in the world. In order for citizens to obtain a weapon, they must obtain a permit from the police, and must register their weapon once they purchase it. There are several categories of permits, with different requirements and rights, including hunting permits, self-defense permits, sports shooting permits and collectors permits. The only categories of people who are legally entitled to carry a weapon are owners of self-defense permits, magistrates, MPs, military forces and certain categories of diplomats. A psychological evaluation is required beforehand in all cases.

Furthermore, knives and daggers may in certain conditions (blade longer than 15 cm and at least 0.4 cm in width, double edge along the whole blade, etc.) be considered weapons and have a similar regime to those of firearms.

In order for a hunter to obtain a hunting/gun ownership license, he must spend a certain "practice time" with a professional hunter. To obtain a self-defense permit, one must be under witness protection. Sporting and collectors licenses require membership in a sport shooting club or collectors' association, respectively.

The amount of ammunition that can be owned is regulated by permit type. Sporting permits allow the ownership of 1,000 matching cartridges per gun; hunting permits allow 300 matching cartridges per gun; self-defense permits allow 50 bullet cartridges and 50 blanks per gun; Collectors permits do not allow for private ownership of ammunition.

Explosive weapons and ammunitions, fully automatic weapons, weapons camouflaged in the shape of another object, armor-piercing ammunition and lethal weapons that do not fit in any category defined by the law are prohibited.

The type of gun is also regulated by permit. Below is a shortened version of the table detailing the restrictions by type of lethal weapon and permit, for civilian owners. Note that for collectors, short weapons designed after 1945 are forbidden, while only non-lethal weapons are allowed for self-defense permits.

It is illegal to use or carry weapons with a muzzle velocity of over 10 kJ if "the barrel is fitted with devices conceived or adapted to reduce recoil"

Gun type	Hunting	Sporting	Collection
Short, center-fire weapons such as pistols and revolvers	No	Yes	Yes
Long, semi-automatic weapons with a magazine capacity of more than 3 cartridges	No	Yes	Yes
Long, semi-automatic weapons that retain the appearance of a fully automatic weapon	Yes	No	Yes
Long, semi-automatic weapons with a magazine capacity of at most 3 cartridges, and which cannot be reasonably modified to hold more than 3 cartridges	Yes	Yes	Yes
Long, smooth-bore semi-automatic and repetition weapons with a length of at most 60 cm	Yes	Yes	Yes
Short, single-shot centerfire weapons with a length of at most 28 cm	No	Yes	Yes
Short, rim-fire single-shot, semi-automatic and repetition weapons	No	Yes	Yes
Single-shot center-fire rifles	Yes	Yes	Yes
Single-shot smoothbore weapons at least 28 cm long	Yes	Yes	Yes

Note that there are other restrictions for obtaining weapons under a sports-shooting license.

Minors (14 and older) may also use a weapon, provided that they are under the supervision of someone who has a gun license. However, they cannot own or carry one until the age of 18.

The use of guns for self-defense is only allowed if the gun is a last resort option.

==== Slovakia ====
Gun ownership in Slovakia is regulated principally by law 190/2003 (law of weapons and ammunition). A firearms license may be issued to an applicant at least 21 years of age (18 years for category D if they own a valid hunting permit, 15 years for state representative in sport-shooting), with no criminal history, and of sound health and mind, who has a valid reason for owning a gun, passes an oral exam covering aspects of gun law, safe handling, and first aid.

Licenses are issued in 6 categories:

- Category A: Concealed carry for self-defense
- Category B: Home self-defense
- Category C: Possession for work purposes
- Category D: Long guns for hunting
- Category E: Possession for sport shooting
- Category F: Collecting

A concealed carry license is only issued if the police deem a sufficient justification. Because of that issue of this license is may-issue in practice, and vary across Slovakia by stance of individual police department issuing licence. It is kind of similar to California, some department is almost shall-issue, another need true sufficient reason (like a constant more than average threat, previous assaults on applicant, transports of money, former service in army or law enforcement, legal awareness of applicant, clientelism). Only about 2% of the adult population holds this license.

There is an exception for non-repeating muzzle-loaded firearms, which may be purchased without a license.

==== Slovenia ====
Gun ownership in Slovenia is regulated under the "Weapons Law" (Zakon o orožju) which is harmonised with the directives of the EU. Gun permits are issued to applicants at least 18 years old, reliable, without criminal history and who has not been a conscientious objector, who passes a medical exam and a test on firearm safety. A specific reason must be given for gun ownership: for hunting or target shooting, the applicant must provide proof of membership in a hunting or sports shooting organization; for collection, the applicant must arrange safe storage with a level of security dependent on the type of weapons; for self-defense, the applicant must prove a risk to personal safety to such an extent that a weapon is needed.

As in most EU member states, the ownership of Category A firearms is prohibited; however these can be owned by weapon collectors, providing that requirements are met. Suppressors are legal and unregulated since 2021. Firearms must be stored in a locked cabinet with ammunition stored separately. Concealed carry is allowed in special circumstances. A gun permit is also required for airguns with muzzle velocity greater than 200 m/s (660 ft/s) or energy of 20 joules (15 ft⋅lbf).

==== Spain ====
Firearm regulation in Spain is restrictive, enacted in Citizen Security Protection Organic Act of 2015 and the Weapons Regulation (Royal Decree 137/1993). Both laws are covered by article 149.1.26.ª of the Spanish Constitution, which attributes to the State the exclusive competence in terms of the "regime of production, trade, possession and use of weapons and explosives".

A firearm license may be obtained from the Guardia Civil after passing a police background check, a physiological and medical test, and a practical and theoretical exam. Shotgun, rifle and sporting licenses must be renewed after 5 years, subject to firearm inspection. Sporting licence requires to present proof of sporting activity of at least one competition each year. A minimum score may be required for some categories. Police may inspect firearms at any time. A self-defense and concealed carry license must be renewed every year, and is only available under special conditions.

A license-holder may own up to 6 shotguns, and unlimited rifles. With a sporting license, valid for 5 years, 1 to 10 handguns may be owned, depending on sports-shooting level. Magazine capacity for semi-automatic centerfire rifles and semi-automatic shotguns is limited to 10 rounds for sports shooting and 2 rounds for hunting. Handgun magazines are limited to 20 round capacity. Rimfire rifles, regardless of type have no magazine limit. Rifles chambered for certain cartridges with military origins are prohibited, such as .223/5.56 NATO and .50 BMG. The .308 Winchester and 7.62x39 mm (AK round) cartridges are only permitted in bolt-action, repetition or single-shot firearms. Proof of ownership of an approved safe is required for all centerfire rifles and handguns, and the owner is responsible for firearm thefts. Ammunition must be stored separately. Rifle and handgun ammunition may only be possessed for legally owned firearms, and purchases and possession is limited to 200 rounds rifle and 100 rounds for handguns. In addition, there are yearly limits in quantity (1000 for rifles,100 for handguns); however additional quantities can be petitioned, mainly for sporting use. For shotgun Ammunition, adults with a valid ID can purchase/possess up to 5,000 shells and there are no yearly limits in quantity. License-holders are only allowed to transport their unloaded firearms from their residence to the shooting range or hunting field and back, with no detours. Firearms may only be discharged at approved shooting ranges or hunting grounds (in season).

There are firearm license for private security for handguns and rifles. These cannot be used outside of work and must be stored in the workplace premises (with approved safe).

In addition there are handgun license for self-defense in concealed carry. However, this is granted on a "may issue" basis with several standards of necessity to be met and very few are granted. This license must be renewed annually and is not automatic.

Members of police forces and officers and non-commissioned officers of the armed forces have a special firearms license which encompasses all of the others. There are additional licenses for collectors and muzzle-loading firearms.

==== Sweden ====
Gun ownership in Sweden is regulated by Vapenlagen 1996:67 (literally, The Weapon Law), modified by weapon decree Vapenförordningen 1996:70 and FAP 551-3 / RPSFS 2009:13. The police issue licenses to persons older than 18 years in good standing on the "need to have" basis, which generally implies either hunting or sport shooting. Passing a hunting examination or membership in an approved sport shooting club for six months is required. Sport shooting licenses must be renewed every 5 years, whereas hunting licenses are valid for the lifetime of the holder. License-holders may lend a weapon to a person at least 15 years of age for supervised use.

A separate license is required for each particular firearm or caliber conversion kit. There's no codified limit on the number of licenses a person can hold, but in practice a license-holder may own up to six hunting rifles, ten handguns, or a mix of eight rifles and handguns. Firearms must be stored in an approved safe. A firearm registered for hunting may be used for sport shooting, but not vice versa. In 2023, previous restrictions on hunting licenses for semi-automatic firearms based on appearance or military origin were lifted, and as a result the only remaining restrictions specific to hunting are a minimum total weapon length exceeding 60 cm and magazine size on semi-automatic rifles and magazine-fed shotguns. Licenses for fully automatic weapons are not generally issued, with limited exceptions for collection and sport shooting using the WWII era m/45 submachine gun.

Starting 1 July 2022, suppressors no longer require a separate license and can be freely acquired by anyone with a valid gun license and can be legally used both for hunting and target shooting.

Self-defense with firearms, as well as carry, is generally prohibited. Carry permits can be issued by the police under very special circumstances like an immediate and demonstrable threat to life. Transportation of unloaded firearms is allowed to and from approved shooting ranges or hunting grounds. Sweden is notorious for having even pepper spray and other nonlethal self-defence methods under its weapons law with similar legal punishments for misuse.

Firearm collectors must have a clearly stated demarcation of their interest in collecting (e.g.: pre-World War II British handguns). The police may demand security measures on keeping the collection. Collectors may request a time-limited permit to discharge their weapons. Firearms manufactured before 1890 and not using sealed cartridges are exempt from the weapon law.

==== Switzerland ====
Firearm regulations in Switzerland are comparatively liberal. Swiss gun laws are primarily about the acquisition of arms, and not ownership. As such a license is not required to own a gun by itself, but a shall-issue permit is required to purchase most types of firearms. Bolt-action rifles do not require an acquisition permit, and can be acquired with just a background check.

The Swiss have male conscription for military service. A 2011 referendum to force military weapons to be kept at military sites was defeated. Weapons may voluntarily be kept in the local armory and there is no longer an obligation to keep the weapon at home.

The Swiss "Federal Law on Arms, Arms Accessories and Ammunitions" (WG, LArm) of 20 June 1997 has as its objectives (Article 1) to combat the wrongful use of arms, their accessories, parts and ammunition. It governs the acquisition of arms, their introduction into Swiss territory, export, storage, possession, carrying, transport, and brokerage. It regulates the manufacture and trade in arms, and seeks to prevent the wrongful carrying of ammunition and dangerous objects. Article 3 states that "The right to acquire, possess and carry arms is guaranteed in the framework of this law".

=== Georgia ===
In Georgia, civilians above 18 years of age may obtain a firearm permit from the Ministry of Internal Affairs, allowing them to purchase and keep firearms for hunting and sports (pump-action shotguns, hunting rifles, carbines, combined hunting firearms), self-defense (handguns, air guns, sprays, electric tranquilizers) or collections. Permits are denied to persons who are mentally ill, use illicit substances or alcohol recreationally, and those who have criminal records.

=== Kazakhstan ===
Kazakhstan has strict gun laws, heavily regulating civilian firearm ownership. Only shotguns and hunting rifles are generally permitted for civilians, while handguns and automatic weapons are prohibited. To own a firearm, individuals must be at least 18 years old (21 for some weapons), pass a background check, undergo medical and psychological evaluations, and complete firearm safety training. Guns must be stored securely, and carrying them in public is restricted. Self-defense firearms, such as non-lethal weapons (e.g., rubber-bullet guns), are allowed under specific conditions. The government maintains strict oversight, with periodic license renewals and inspections.

As of 2016, there were about 284,000 (or 1.6 per 100 people) registered firearms in Kazakhstan according to the government data.

=== Monaco ===
Law in Monaco divides firearms into two categories:

- Category "A" weapons including hand guns, semi-automatic firearms and those firing centerfire ammunition require membership in the Monaco Rifle Club, a certificate of aptitude and handling for the requested weapon, and no past history of treatment in a psychiatric unit;
- Category "B" weapons are hunting weapons that do not require licensing unless they are imported.

=== North Macedonia ===
To obtain a firearm license in North Macedonia one must be at least 18 years old, able-bodied, healthy, not representing danger to public order, have permanent residency, possess technical knowledge of weapons and regulations related to them and have a justified reason for acquiring the weapon. Justified reasons include:

- Proving one's life or property is in danger;
- Being an active member of hunting or archery associations and passing a specific hunting exam;
- Being a weapons collector;
- Legally inheriting a weapon;
- Weapons having been granted as awards by the state or during archery competitions.

Fully automatic firearms are prohibited. Carrying firearms in public places is prohibited.

North Macedonia has its own defense industry with ATS Group, Eurokompozit Prilep

=== Russia ===
Russian citizens over 21 years of age can obtain a firearms license after attending gun safety classes and passing a federal test and background check. Firearms may be acquired for self-defense, hunting, or sports activities. Carry permits may be issued for hunting firearms licensed for hunting purposes. Initially, purchases are limited to long smooth-bore firearms and pneumatic weapons with a muzzle energy of up to 25 joules (18 ft⋅lbf). After five years of shotgun ownership, rifles may be purchased. Handguns are generally not allowed (except traumatic handguns which are allowed for self-defense but can fire only cartridges with rubber bullets), but with the growing popularity of practical shooting events and competitions in Russia in recent years (e.g. IPSC), handgun ownership has now been allowed and the handguns have to be stored at a shooting club. Rifles and shotguns with barrels shorter than 500 mm (20 in) are prohibited, as are firearms which shoot in bursts or have more than a 10-cartridge capacity. Suppressors are prohibited.

=== Serbia ===
Serbia has weapon laws and ranks third in guns per capita with a strong gun culture, especially in rural areas, with about one million guns in legal circulation. Weapons are regulated by the Weapons and Ammunition Law (Zakon o oružju i municiji).

People over age 18 may own firearms with a permit, which is denied to those with a criminal history, mental disorder, or history of alcohol or illegal substance use. There is a thorough background check with police having the final decision. Firearms must be stored in a designated gun cabinet, and may be confiscated by police if the owner is found irresponsible.

Rifles, shotguns and handguns may be owned with an appropriate permit. Having a permit to own a firearm does not itself allow the bearer to carry the firearm anywhere outside the home, regardless of whether it is concealed or not. The owner may transport their firearms at any time provided they are unloaded. Concealed carry permits for handguns require proving an imminent threat, with the police making a final decision. Therefore, concealed carry permits are hard to obtain. There is no limit on the number of firearms one may own, though every gun transaction is recorded by the police. There is no caliber restriction. Fully automatic firearms and suppressors are prohibited for civilians. Automatic long firearms are allowed to be obtained and used by legal entities under special circumstances. People over 18 years of age can buy and carry stun guns and electric tranquilizers with no permit needed. People over 16 can carry OC sprays. There is no restriction regarding the number of rounds that may be purchased. Ammunition may be bought only for the caliber in which an owned firearm is chambered. Reloading is allowed only to those who have passed an exam in handling explosive materials. Old firearms (produced before 1900), historically significant firearms, as well as black powder firearms (all category C items) may be bought without any permit.

Serbia has its own civilian gun and ammunition industry: Zastava Arms, Prvi Partizan, and Krušik.

=== Turkey ===
Turkey is restrictive in terms of gun control statutes. Civilians in Turkey need to get a license from the police or gendarmerie to own and use firearms, and these licenses last for 5 years. Licenses are available for shotguns (including semi-automatic ones), rifles (bolt-action, lever-action, and some semi-automatics), and handguns. To get a license, you must:

- Be at least 21 years old,
- Be a Turkish citizen or permanent resident,
- Have a valid medical report signed by a group of doctors,
- Have no criminal record or unpaid taxes, and
- Pay the required fees.

As of 2024, fully automatic and short-barreled shotguns are banned. There are no restrictions on magazine size, caliber, or optics for handguns. Some semi-automatic rifles can be owned with a rifle permit, but they are uncommon in the market. Semi-auto rifles typically come in .22LR or 9mm calibers with magazines holding up to 15 rounds. Fully automatic rifles are not allowed for civilians, with very rare exceptions.

Shotgun licenses automatically include a permit to carry or transport the shotgun, but it must be unloaded and covered. Handgun concealed carry permits and rifle carry licenses are harder to get and require a valid reason, like personal protection or hunting. Applicants must show proof of this reason, such as a life threat (approved by the governor) or belonging to specific professions like:

- Company board members/directors (with certain criteria),
- Jewelers, gas station operators, or bank managers,
- Lawyers, commercial pilots, or ship captains,
- Herders, shooting range operators, or foreign exchange bureau owners,
- Notaries, contractors/developers, or people working with explosives,
- Beekeepers, licensed journalists, or rural landowners.

Getting a handgun concealed carry permit is expensive, and each firearm requires a separate carry license. Handgun carry licenses are legally unlimited, but obtaining multiple permits is rare. Rifles can only be carried with a hunting license and for hunting purposes; hunting with semi-automatic rifles is not allowed. Carry licenses usually need renewal every 5 years.

High-powered and tactical semi-automatic rifles are mostly banned for civilians, with very few exceptions. Spare parts for these weapons, especially barrels, are hard to find and replace.

In Turkey, most shooting ranges are indoors and only allow handguns. People with possession licenses need to get a transportation permit from the local police for each trip to the range. However, those with concealed carry licenses do not need such permits.

Shotguns and rifles (for carry license holders) can be used for target shooting outside urban and residential areas. This must be done at least 500 meters away from homes and only with the landowner's permission. To hunt with shotguns or rifles, a hunting license is required.

Licensed armed security personnel, such as those protecting valuable assets, VIPs, critical infrastructure, airports, banks, or high-risk events, can carry semi-automatic and fully automatic weapons, including submachine guns, but only while on duty.

In rural areas, over 50,000 civilians are authorized as "Security Guards" or "Village Guards" to protect against terrorists and looters. This role allows them to carry selective-fire firearms for this specific purpose. These weapons and equipment are usually provided by the military and remain government property.

Public servants, including police officers, military personnel, judges, public prosecutors, and senior politicians, have a lifelong right to apply for free handgun and rifle carry licenses. These licenses are issued on a guaranteed basis. All police officers can carry an unlimited number of handguns and rifles with a carry license. Military officers are allowed up to five handguns and two rifles, while generals are not limited by these rules. Mayors, deputies, ministers, and presidents automatically receive lifetime carry licenses without paying any fees. Some other government employees, such as forest rangers, village headmen, customs officers, judges, and prosecutors, also have lifetime carry licenses. Unlike civilians, public servants (active or retired) do not need to renew their medical certificates every five years.

Turkey has a large shotgun industry, and shotguns are widely available and easy to purchase. Getting a shotgun license is simpler and cheaper compared to handgun or rifle licenses. It requires a clean bill of health, a clear criminal record, and no outstanding tax debt. One shotgun license allows ownership of up to five shotguns. Spare parts are widely available, and rebarreling is both easy and legal. Shotguns are much more affordable due to open market conditions and competition among numerous national and international brands, unlike rifles and handguns, which are sold exclusively through the government-controlled monopoly, MKEK.

We Will Stop Femicide Platform (KCDP) has called for gun law to be tightened.

=== Ukraine ===
As of 27 February 2022 there are no restrictions on ownership of any types of weapons, in fact the Ukrainian government has given out thousands of military grade weapons to its populace. This is due to the ongoing Russo-Ukrainian war.

Ukraine is the only European country without firearms legislation. Regulation is by executive fiat; specifically, Order No. 622 of the Ministry of Internal Affairs. A firearm license may be issued to citizens who meet an age requirement (21 for shotguns, 18 for shotguns for hunting purposes, and 25 for rifles), have no criminal record or history of domestic violence or mental illness and have a specific reason such as target shooting, hunting or collecting. Handguns of .22, 9 mm, .357 magnum and .38 caliber are permitted only for target shooting and those who can prove a threat against their lives (who are typically also given concealed carry permits). All firearms must be stored unloaded in a safe.

Citizens wishing to purchase weapons must complete courses on the fundamentals of Ukrainian legislation on weapons, their technical design and rules for the safe handling of weapons, as well as practical shooting. The organization of relevant courses is assigned to the internal affairs bodies. In order to obtain a weapon permit, citizens submit an application in the prescribed form, a certificate of completion of relevant courses, undergo a medical examination, an inspection of the internal affairs agencies and pass a test on the fundamentals of current legislation and rules for handling weapons and their application skills.

Article 263 of the Ukrainian Criminal Code says that for illegal carrying, storing and selling firearms, explosives and ammunition a person faces from 3 to 7 years in prison.

Weapon permits are not issued, and issued ones are canceled if there are:

- Certificates (conclusions) of the medical institution that a person cannot own a weapon for health reasons;
- The court's decision to declare him incompetent, partially capable, or to lead missing;
- Information about the systematic violations by the person of the rules of arms trafficking, public order, being registered and treated for alcohol use disorder, use of narcotic drugs or psychotropic substances without a doctor's prescription;
- Court verdict on conviction of a person to imprisonment;
- Outstanding or not removed in the prescribed manner of conviction for serious crimes, as well as crimes committed with the use of weapons or explosive devices;
- Court rulings on the direction to serve deprivation of liberty, conditionally convicted with a delay in the execution of the sentence, or a court ruling on the replacement of the unmerited term of correctional labor with a sentence of imprisonment.

The list of diseases and physical defects, in the presence of which a weapon permit is not issued, is approved by the Cabinet of Ministers of Ukraine.

Foreigners have the right to purchase civilian weapons of ammunition and ammunition for permits issued by the internal affairs bodies on the basis of petitions from diplomatic missions or consular offices of the states of which they are citizens, as well as ministries and other central executive authorities of Ukraine, subject to the export of such weapons from Ukraine later than 5 days after purchase. Foreigners who have received certificates of permanent residence in Ukraine have the right to purchase weapons in the manner established for citizens of Ukraine. Hunting and sporting weapons can be imported by foreigners into Ukraine with the appropriate permission of the internal affairs bodies and hunting agreements made with hunting farms or inviting ministries and other central executive authorities to participate in sports competitions.

=== United Kingdom (Except Northern Ireland) ===
The UK increased firearm regulation through several Firearms Acts, leading to an outright ban on automatic firearms and many semi-automatic firearms. Breech-loading handguns are also tightly controlled. The Firearms Act 1968 sets out three main types of firearm that require different licences:

- Section 1 firearms require a firearms certificate (FAC), and includes any article that can be defined as a firearm but which is not covered under some other section. Section 1 most commonly includes bolt-action rifles, semi-automatic rifles in rimfire only, long-barrelled pistols, and all shotguns that do not conform to section 2 requirements. There are additional requirements for both sections, such as length and ammunition type, and some accessories such as suppressors are also subject to licensing restrictions.
- Section 2 firearms are shotguns with a maximum magazine capacity of two cartridges, excluding those in the chamber, and require a Shotgun Certificate (SGC); unlike the other licences, the onus is on the police to find good reason not to grant applicants a licence.
- Section 5 firearms are generally prohibited from private ownership. A S.5 permit may be obtained under certain circumstances, but from the Home Office or the Scottish Government, rather than local Police. Firearms prohibited under Section 5 include fully automatic firearms; semi-automatic and pump action rifled firearms other than those chambered for .22 rimfire cartridges; breechloading short firearms (less than 30 cm barrel length or less than 60 cm overall length); rifled firearms not chambered for .22 rimfire cartridges which automatically eject spent cartridges (lever and button release rifles); rocket launchers and mortars (other than for line throwing or pyrotechnic use); firearms disguised as another object; ammunition designed to explode on impact.
- Section 7 of the Firearms (Amendment) Act 1997 permits bona-fide collectors to obtain handguns prohibited under Section 5(aba) on the authority of local Police, rather than the Home Office or Scottish Government. Section 7(1) enables handguns manufactured before 1919 and chambered in a 'not readily available' calibre to be held on a firearms certificate. Handguns held by virtue of Section 7(1) may only be held as part of a collection, may not be fired but may be kept at the certificate holder's home. Section 7(3) enables handguns "of particular rarity, aesthetic quality or technical interest" or "of historical importance" to be held on a firearms certificate. Section 7(3) firearms may be fired but must be kept at Designated Sites. Handguns held on firearms certificates by virtue of Section 7 are typically granted only to those with a demonstrable academic background in firearm or military history, such as members of the Historical Breechloading Smallarms Association (HBSA).

An SGC allows the holder to purchase and own any number of shotguns, so long as they can be securely stored, and does not restrict purchase or storage of ammunition; additionally they may legally give shotgun ammunition to non-licence holders. Section 1 and 5 firearms require individual permission for each firearm, and there are restrictions as to the type and quantity of ammunition held. Aside from Northern Ireland, private ownership of most handguns was effectively banned in 1997, with exception for section 5 firearms permits, which are only generally issued to maritime security personnel, and those under police protection, and a small number of other narrow exceptions (e.g. Section 7 and exemptions for humane dispatch). In the run up to the 2012 Olympic Games, British Shooting reached agreement with the Home Office to nominate a small number of elite athletes who could keep and train with Section 5 pistols in the UK at designated ranges. These exemptions have remained and elite athletes, with the support of British Shooting or Scottish Target Shooting, may continue to be issued with Section 5 permits to allow them to train within Great Britain.

There are several factors that may disqualify applicants. A custodial sentence of between three months and three years disqualifies applicants for five years from release; three years or greater disqualifies applicants for life. "Intemperate habits", such as substance use, may disqualify applicants. Being of "unsound mind", meaning a history of mental illness, or other relevant medical conditions may disqualify applicants, however there are no conditions that "make them automatically unsuitable to possess a firearm", and police will contact the applicant's general practitioner, who place a flag on the records of all licence holders. Applicants must also have suitable measures for storing firearms and ammunition, such as a gun safe. The FAC additionally requires demonstrating a good reason for each firearm the applicant wishes to own (such as hunting, pest control, collecting, or target shooting). Self-defence is only accepted as a good reason in Northern Ireland.

== Oceania ==
Firearms are completely prohibited for civilian use without exceptions in Nauru, Palau and Marshall Islands. Fiji suspended all firearm licenses in 2000, Cook Islands and Solomon Islands did the same respectively in 1999 and 1992. Papua New Guinea does not issue new licenses since 2000, but former are still valid. Kiribati effectively made it impossible to obtain new firearms by banning import of them.

=== Australia ===
Gun laws in Australia are under the jurisdiction of the state governments, with the importation of guns regulated by the federal government. Gun laws were largely aligned in 1996 by the National Firearms Agreement. In two federally funded gun buybacks and voluntary surrenders and state governments' gun amnesties before and after the Port Arthur Massacre, more than a million firearms were collected and destroyed, possibly one third of the national stock.

A person must have a firearm licence to possess or use a firearm. Licence holders must be able to demonstrate at least one "genuine reason" (which explicitly excludes self-defence) for holding a firearm licence and must not be a "prohibited person". All firearms must be registered by serial number to the owner, who must also hold a firearms licence.

=== New Zealand ===
New Zealand's gun laws focus mainly on vetting firearm owners. A firearms licence may be issued by police to applicants who attend a safety lecture, pass a written test on safety and the Arms Code, and have secure storage for firearms and ammunition; the police will also interview the applicant and two references to be certain the applicant is "fit and proper" to own a firearm. Having criminal associations, a history of domestic violence, mental instability, or alcohol or drug use almost always result in the application being denied. Misbehavior involving firearms commonly leads to a firearms licence being revoked by police. Even when licensed, a person may only be in possession of a firearm for a particular lawful, proper and sufficient purpose, for which the NZ Police policy is to exclude self-defense, however this is not written in the Arms Act or supporting regulations.

Machine carbines, sub-machine guns, and firearms capable of full automatic fire are all classified as restricted weapons, requiring a special procurement permit issued by the Police. Additionally, pistols intended for use outside of Commissioner-approved shooting ranges are subject to specific regulations and may require special permits beyond those for shooting club use.

After the Christchurch mosque shootings in 2019, legislation to restrict semi-automatic firearms and magazines with a capacity of more than 10 rounds, and provide an amnesty and buyback of such weapons was introduced and passed by the New Zealand parliament.

== See also ==
- Arms Trade Treaty
- Concealed carry
- Defensive gun use
- Estimated number of civilian guns per capita by country
- Glossary of firearms terms
- Gun control
- Gun ownership
- Gun violence
- Index of gun politics articles
- Laws on crossbows
- List of countries by firearm-related death rate
- Percent of households with guns by country
- Right to arms
