= Index of gun politics articles =

This is a list of gun politics articles, including gun politics by nation, and legal and political concepts and terms related to gun politics.

== 0-9 ==
- 2nd Amendment Day
- 2018 NRA boycott
- 2018 United States gun violence protests
- 3D printed firearms

== A ==
- Arms control
- Arms Trade Treaty
- Arms trafficking
- Assault pistol
- Assault weapon
- Assault weapons, federal ban in the United States
- Assault weapons legislation in the United States
- Australia, Gun politics in

== B ==
- Brazil, Gun politics in
- Bullet button

== C ==
- Canada, Firearms regulation in
- China, Firearms ownership law in
- Concealed carry
- Constitutional carry
- Czech Republic, Gun politics in

== D ==
- Defensive gun use

== E ==
- European Firearms Directive
- Extreme Risk Protection Order

== F ==
- Finland, Gun politics in
- Firearm death rates in the United States by state
- France, Gun politics in

== G ==
- Germany, Gun politics in
- Gun buyback program
- Gun control
- Gun control after the Sandy Hook Elementary School shooting
- Gun ownership
- Gun rights
- Gun show loophole
- Gun violence

== H ==
- Honduras, Gun politics in

== I ==
- Ireland, Gun politics in
- Italy, Gun politics in

== J ==
- Jamaica, Gun politics in

== K ==
- Kuwait, Gun politics in

== L ==
- List of countries by firearm-related death rate

== M ==
- Mexico, Gun politics in

== N ==
- National Rifle Association of America
- New Zealand, Gun politics in
- Norway, Gun politics in
- Number of guns per capita by country

== O ==
- One handgun a month law
- Opposition to hunting
- Overview of gun laws by nation

== P ==
- Parts kit (firearms)
- Privately made firearm
- Pakistan, Gun politics in
- Philippines, Gun politics in
- Poland, Gun politics in

== R ==
- Receiver (firearms)
- Right to keep and bear arms

== S ==
- Second Amendment sanctuary
- Second Amendment to the United States Constitution
- Small Arms Survey
- South Africa, Gun politics in
- Switzerland, Gun politics in

== T ==
- Texas, Gun violence and gun control in

== U ==
- Ukraine, Gun politics in
- United Kingdom, Gun politics in
- United States, Campus carry in
- United States, Concealed carry in
- United States, Gun culture in
- United States, Gun politics in
- United States, Gun shows in
- United States, Gun violence in
- United States, Mass shootings in
- United States, Open carry in
- United States, Public opinion on gun control in
- United States, Right to keep and bear arms in
- Universal background check

== See also ==
- Template:Gun politics interest groups in the United States
