= Julieta Castellanos =

Honduran sociologist

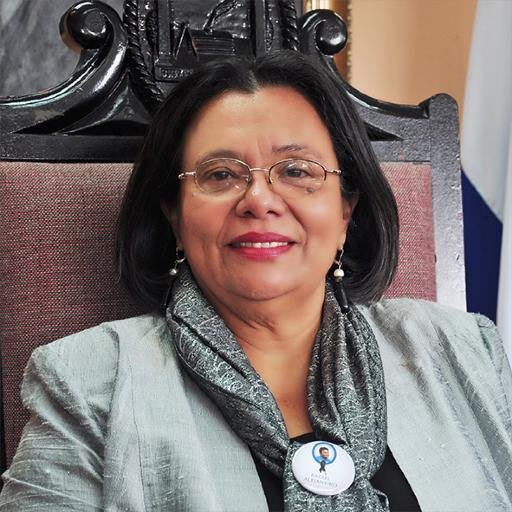
- Castellanos in 2016
- Born: Julieta Gonzalina Castellanos Ruiz; 8 January 1954 (age 72); San Francisco de Becerra, Olancho
- Education: Universidad Nacional Autónoma de Honduras; University of Costa Rica
- Awards: Martin Luther King, Jr. Award; International Women of Courage Award
- Scientific career
- Fields: Sociology

Julieta Castellanos (born 8 January 1954) is a Honduran sociologist and the dean of the National Autonomous University of Honduras (UNAH) since 2009. Castellanos is known for campaigning against violence in Honduras, focusing on both drug cartels and police corruption. She has advocated for both judicial and police reform. Castellanos founded the Observatorio de la Violencia (Violence Observatory) at UNAH in 2004, a center that analyzes crime statistics in Honduras. She was also a member of the Truth and Reconciliation Commission, which was tasked with clarifying the facts related to the 2009 coup that ousted President Manuel Zelaya.

== Early life and education ==
Julieta Castellanos Ruiz was born in San Francisco de Becerra, Olancho on 8 January 1954 to Rafael Castellanos of Santa Bárbara, and Ernestina Ruiz of Olancho. She grew up in the rural Honduran sugar fields. In 1968 her father brought her an examination for admission to the Normal School for Girls in the city of Tegucigalpa. She was accepted and graduated in 1973 with a teaching degree. In 1974 she won two scholarships to study Social Work at the National Autonomous University of Honduras (UNAH) and Social Sciences in the College of Teachers. After several years of study, she finished her studies with a B.A. in sociology from the University of Costa Rica.

After completing her studies Castellanos became a professor at UNAH in 1978. She was head of the Social Sciences Department and President of the Association of Teachers from 1997 to 2001. Castellanos also served as President of the Association of Professors of the University Center of General Studies (CUEG) in 1986, Coordinator of the Violence Observatory since 2005, consultant to the Arias Foundation for Human Progress and the Washington Office on Latin America (WOLA), and Research Associate of the Centro de Documentatión de Honduras (CEDOH). She is also a member of the Inter-American Dialogue.

For 13 years, Castellanos was also the author of a newspaper column.

== Chancellor of the UNAH ==
Castellanos was elected to a four-year term as Rector of the National Autonomous University of Honduras in 2009. At the time of her appointment she served as Coordinator of the UNAH Violence Observatory and Director of the Instituto Universitario en Democracia Paz y Seguridad (Institute for Democracy, Peace and Security, IUDPAS), which was created with support from the United Nations Development Programme (UNDP) and the Swedish International Development Cooperation Agency (SIDA) when Castellanos worked as a consultant for the UNDP. Castellanos replaced Jorge Abraham Arita, who was recalled for incompetence. In a press conference, College Board president Olvin Rodriguez highlighted the accomplishments of Castellanos. According to Rodriguez, she was chosen for being well-respected, not only by the university community, but also by Honduran society and internationally.

Shortly after her appointment, President Manuel Zelaya was ousted in a coup. During a demonstration by University students, Castellanos was pushed down by police when she attempted to stop them from breaking up the gathering. During her tenure as rector, she has clashed with SITRAUNAH, the union for the university's employees, and has been criticized for the firing of 60 employees who were protesting on the university's premises in 2009. Castellanos oversaw the construction of a sports complex, an administrative building, and a university clinic, for which UNAH invested L1,500 million.

Castellanos' four years as rector ended in April 2013. She remained interim rector and was re-elected for another term as head of the university in September 2013.

== Campaigning against violence and corruption ==
Castellanos has been a vocal advocate for police reform and measures to curb violent crime in Honduras. She pushed for an international commission to oversee a purge of the police, an idea that was approved by the National Congress. Castellanos has also weighed in on gun politics in Honduras, calling on the Honduran armed forces to destroy illegal firearms, including AK-47s.

In October 2011, Castellanos' 22-year-old son was kidnapped and murdered by Honduran national police. The incident called attention to the degree of corruption within the Honduran police. Castellanos called for an end to foreign aid for the Honduran police and military, demanding that they "stop feeding the beast."

== Awards ==
Castellanos was presented with the inaugural Martin Luther King Jr. Award on 20 April 2012 at a ceremony sponsored by the Martin Luther King Jr. Foundation and the Instituto Hondureño de Cultura Interamericana.

Castellanos received the International Women of Courage Award in March 2013 from the U.S. State Department. The award was presented by US Secretary of State John Kerry and First Lady Michelle Obama.
