= Gun ownership =

Status of owning a firearm

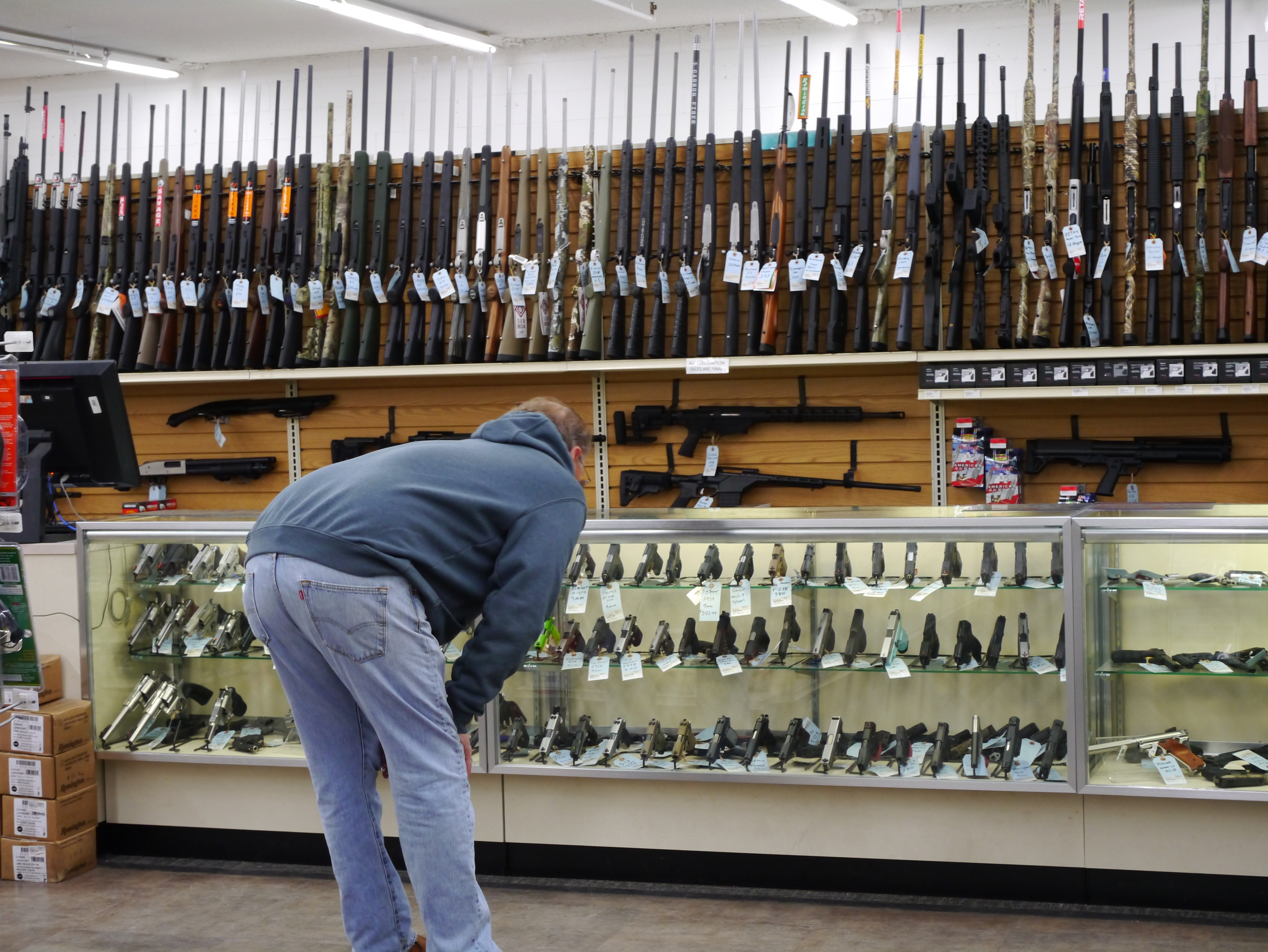
A gun store in Wenatchee, Washington, United States

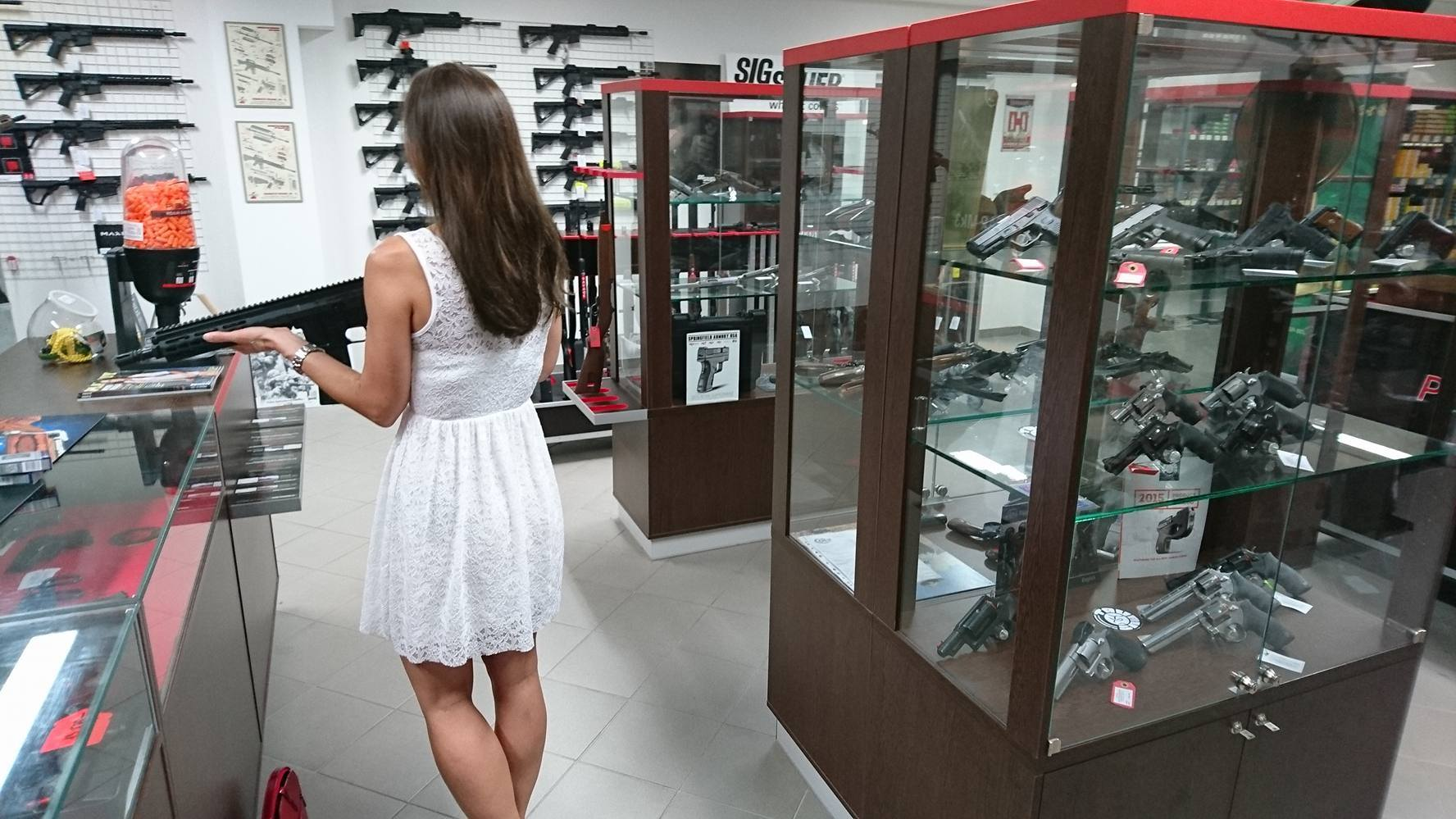
A gun store in Prague, Czech Republic

Gun ownership is the ownership of a gun or firearm.

In 2018, the Small Arms Survey reported that there are over one billion small arms distributed globally, of which 857 million (about 85 percent) are in civilian hands. The survey stated that US civilians account for an estimated 393 million (about 46 percent) of the worldwide total of civilian held firearms, or about 120.5 firearms for every 100 American residents.

From 1994 to 2023, gun ownership increased 28% in the US. In 2023, about 16.7 million firearms were sold in the US In the first four months of 2024, nearly 5.5 million firearms were sold, averaging around 1.3 million per month. About 72% of American gun owners say they own a gun primarily for protection.

Gun ownership is a legal right in many nations. In the overwhelming majority of countries, this right is heavily restricted. A marginal set of countries, including the United States, Switzerland, and the Czech Republic, have a more liberal approach. These countries have explicit constitutional or statutory frameworks that affirm civilian access to firearms for self-defense, sport, and militia purposes.

The world's armed forces control about 133 million (approximately 13 percent) of the global total of small arms, of which over 43 percent belong to two countries: Russia (30.3 million) and China (27.5 million). Law enforcement agencies control about 23 million (about 2 percent) of the global total of small arms. Gun ownership is a protected right in countries such as the United States and Yemen.

== Global distribution of civilian-held firearms ==
The following data comes from the Small Arms Survey. For more tables see: Estimated number of civilian guns per capita by country and Percent of households with guns by country.

Worldwide civilian firearms holdings, 2017 estimates.
Countries and territories	Firearms in civilian possession	Population 2017	Civilian firearms per 100 people
Afghanistan	4,270,000	34,169,000	12.5
Albania	350,000	2,911,000	12.0
Algeria	877,000	41,064,000	2.1
American Samoa (United States)	400	56,000	0.7
Andorra	10,000	69,000	14.1
Angola	2,982,000	26,656,000	11.2
Antigua and Barbuda	5,000	94,000	5.3
Argentina	3,256,000	44,272,000	7.4
Armenia	186,000	3,032,000	6.1
Aruba (Netherlands)	3,000	105,000	2.6
Australia	3,573,000	24,642,000	14.5
Austria	2,577,000	8,592,000	30.0
Azerbaijan	362,000	9,974,000	3.6
Bahamas	74,000	397,000	18.8
Bahrain	181,000	1,419,000	12.8
Bangladesh	659,000	164,828,000	0.4
Barbados	10,000	286,000	3.5
Belarus	581,000	9,459,000	6.1
Belgium	1,451,000	11,444,000	12.7
Belize	37,000	375,000	10.0
Benin	33,000	11,459,000	0.3
Bermuda (United Kingdom)	3,000	61,000	4.6
Bhutan	6,000	793,000	0.8
Bolivia	218,000	11,053,000	2.0
Bosnia and Herzegovina	1,185,000	3,793,000	31.2
Botswana	97,000	2,344,000	4.1
Brazil	17,510,000	211,243,000	8.3
Brunei	6,000	434,000	1.4
Bulgaria	590,000	7,045,000	8.4
Burkina Faso	175,000	19,173,000	0.9
Burundi	238,000	11,936,000	2.0
Cambodia	717,000	16,076,000	4.5
Cameroon	510,000	24,514,000	2.1
Canada	12,708,000	36,626,000	34.7
Cape Verde (Cabo Verde)	31,000	533,000	5.7
Cayman Islands (United Kingdom)	6,000	62,000	9.2
Central African Republic	94,000	5,099,000	1.8
Chad	151,000	14,965,000	1.0
Channel Islands	23,000	165,000	14.0
Chile	2,220,000	18,313,000	12.1
China	49,735,000	1,388,233,000	3.6
Christmas Island	0	2,000	0.0
Colombia	4,971,000	49,068,000	10.1
Comoros	12,000	826,000	1.5
Costa Rica	493,000	4,906,000	10.0
Croatia	576,000	4,210,000	13.7
Cuba	234,000	11,390,000	2.1
Curaçao	4,000	160,000	2.6
Cyprus	285,000	839,000	34.0
Czech Republic	1,323,000	10,555,000	12.5
DR Congo	946,000	82,243,000	1.2
Denmark	567,000	5,712,000	9.9
Djibouti	28,000	911,000	3.1
Dominica	5,000	73,000	6.2
Dominican Republic	795,000	10,767,000	7.4
Ecuador	402,000	16,626,000	2.4
Egypt	3,931,000	95,215,000	4.1
El Salvador	737,000	6,167,000	12.0
England and Wales	2,731,000	58,877,000	4.6
Equatorial Guinea	112,000	894,000	12.5
Eritrea	23,000	5,482,000	0.4
Estonia	65,000	1,306,000	5.0
Ethiopia	377,000	104,345,000	0.4
Falkland Islands (United Kingdom)	2,000	3,000	66.7
Faroe Islands (Denmark)	5,000	49,000	9.9
Fiji	5,000	903,000	0.5
Finland	1,793,000	5,541,000	32.4
France	12,732,000	64,939,000	19.6
French Guiana (France)	55,000	283,000	19.6
French Polynesia (France)	7,000	289,000	2.5
Gabon	61,000	1,801,000	3.4
Gambia	137,000	2,120,000	6.5
Georgia	402,000	3,973,000	10.1
Germany	15,822,000	80,636,000	19.6
Ghana	2,280,000	28,657,000	8.0
Gibraltar (United Kingdom)	1,000	32,000	4.1
Greece	1,920,000	10,893,000	17.6
Greenland (Denmark)	13,000	56,000	22.3
Grenada	5,000	108,000	4.6
Guadeloupe (France)	40,000	472,000	8.5
Guam (United States)	20,000	174,000	11.5
Guatemala	2,062,000	17,005,000	12.1
Guinea	130,000	13,291,000	1.0
Guinea-Bissau	29,000	1,933,000	1.5
Guyana	122,000	774,000	15.8
Haiti	291,000	10,983,000	2.6
Holy See	0	1,000	0.0
Honduras	1,171,000	8,305,000	14.1
Hong Kong (China)	265,000	7,402,000	3.6
Hungary	1,023,000	9,788,000	10.5
Iceland	106,000	334,000	31.7
India	71,101,000	1,342,513,000	5.3
Indonesia	82,000	263,510,000	0.03
Iran	5,890,000	80,946,000	7.3
Iraq	7,588,000	38,654,000	19.6
Ireland	342,000	4,749,000	7.2
Israel	557,000	8,323,000	6.7
Italy	8,609,000	59,798,000	14.4
Ivory Coast (Côte d'Ivoire)	1,049,000	23,816,000	4.4
Jamaica	246,000	2,813,000	8.8
Japan	377,000	126,045,000	0.3
Jordan	1,473,000	7,877,000	18.7
Kazakhstan	504,000	18,064,000	2.8
Kenya	750,000	48,467,000	1.5
Kiribati	900	116,000	0.8
Kosovo	436,000	1,831,000	23.8
Kuwait	685,000	4,100,000	16.7
Kyrgyzstan	171,000	6,125,000	2.8
Laos	215,000	7,038,000	3.0
Latvia	205,000	1,945,000	10.5
Lebanon	1,927,000	6,039,000	31.9
Lesotho	105,000	2,185,000	4.8
Liberia	97,000	4,730,000	2.1
Libya	851,000	6,409,000	13.3
Liechtenstein	11,000	38,000	28.8
Lithuania	385,000	2,831,000	13.6
Luxembourg	110,000	584,000	18.9
Macau (China)	22,000	606,000	3.6
Madagascar	168,000	25,613,000	0.7
Malawi	47,000	18,299,000	0.3
Malaysia	217,000	31,164,000	0.7
Maldives	23,000	376,000	6.2
Mali	206,000	18,690,000	1.1
Malta	119,000	421,000	28.3
Marshall Islands	300	53,000	0.5
Martinique (France)	34,000	396,000	8.5
Mauritania	120,000	4,266,000	2.8
Mauritius	106,000	1,281,000	8.3
Mexico	16,809,000	130,223,000	12.9
Federated States of Micronesia	700	106,000	0.7
Moldova	121,000	4,055,000	3.0
Monaco	7,000	38,000	18.4
Mongolia	242,000	3,052,000	7.9
Montenegro	245,000	626,000	39.1
Montserrat (United Kingdom)	300	5,000	5.4
Morocco	1,690,000	35,241,000	4.8
Mozambique	1,337,000	29,538,000	4.5
Myanmar	877,000	54,836,000	1.6
Namibia	396,000	2,569,000	15.4
Nauru	0	10,000	0.0
Nepal	444,000	29,187,000	1.5
Netherlands	442,000	17,033,000	2.6
New Caledonia (France)	115,000	270,000	42.5
New Zealand	1,212,000	4,605,000	26.3
Nicaragua	323,000	6,218,000	5.2
Niger	117,000	21,564,000	0.5
Nigeria	6,154,000	191,836,000	3.2
Northern Ireland	206,000	1,873,000	11.0
Northern Mariana Islands (United States)	1,000	56,000	2.6
North Korea	76,000	25,405,000	0.3
Norway	1,537,000	5,331,000	28.8
Oman	792,000	4,741,000	16.7
Pakistan	43,917,000	196,744,000	22.3
Palau	100	22,000	0.5
Palestine	56,000	4,952,000	1.1
Panama	436,000	4,051,000	10.8
Papua New Guinea	79,000	7,934,000	1.0
Paraguay	1,140,000	6,812,000	16.7
Peru	633,000	32,166,000	2.0
Philippines	3,776,000	103,797,000	3.6
Poland	968,000	38,564,000	2.5
Portugal	2,186,000	10,265,000	21.3
Puerto Rico (United States)	422,000	3,679,000	11.5
Puntland	246,000	1,995,000	12.3
Qatar	390,000	2,338,000	16.7
Congo	119,000	4,866,000	2.4
Réunion (France)	171,000	873,000	19.6
Romania	506,000	19,238,000	2.6
Russia	17,620,000	143,375,000	12.3
Rwanda	66,000	12,160,000	0.5
Saint Kitts and Nevis	2,000	57,000	3.4
Saint Lucia	6,000	188,000	3.4
Saint Martin (France)	3,000	32,000	8.5
Saint Vincent and the Grenadines	4,000	110,000	3.4
Samoa	20,000	196,000	10.1
San Marino	5,000	32,000	15.6
São Tomé and Príncipe	7,000	198,000	3.4
Saudi Arabia	12,564,000	32,743,000	53.7
Scotland	305,000	5,436,000	5.6
Senegal	323,000	16,054,000	2.0
Serbia	2,719,000	6,946,000	39.1
Seychelles	4,000	98,000	4.1
Sierra Leone	35,000	6,733,000	0.5
Singapore	20,000	5,785,000	0.3
Sint Maarten (Netherlands)	2,000	40,000	4.2
Slovakia	355,000	5,432,000	6.5
Slovenia	324,000	2,071,000	15.6
Solomon Islands	1,000	606,000	0.2
Somalia	1,145,000	9,225,000	12.4
Somaliland	456,000	3,823,000	11.9
South Africa	5,351,000	55,436,000	9.7
South Korea	79,000	50,705,000	0.2
South Sudan	1,255,000	13,096,000	9.6
Spain	3,464,000	46,070,000	7.5
Sri Lanka	494,000	20,905,000	2.4
Sudan	2,768,000	42,166,000	6.6
Suriname	88,000	552,000	15.9
Swaziland	64,000	1,320,000	4.8
Sweden	2,296,000	9,921,000	23.1
Switzerland	2,332,000	8,454,000	27.6
Syria	1,547,000	18,907,000	8.2
Taiwan	10,000	23,405,000	0.04
Tajikistan	37,000	8,858,000	0.4
Tanzania	427,000	56,878,000	0.8
Thailand	10,342,000	68,298,000	15.1
Timor-Leste	3,000	1,237,000	0.3
Togo	58,000	7,692,000	0.8
Tonga	9,000	108,000	8.0
Trinidad and Tobago	43,000	1,369,000	3.2
Tunisia	123,000	11,495,000	1.1
Turkey	13,249,000	80,418,000	16.5
Turkmenistan	23,000	5,503,000	0.4
Turks and Caicos Islands (United Kingdom)	1,000	35,000	3.3
Tuvalu	100	10,000	1.2
Uganda	331,000	41,653,000	0.8
Ukraine	4,396,000	44,405,000	9.9
United Arab Emirates	1,569,000	9,398,000	16.7
United States	393,347,000	326,474,000	120.5
Uruguay	1,198,000	3,457,000	34.7
Uzbekistan	127,000	30,691,000	0.4
Vanuatu	11,000	276,000	3.9
Venezuela	5,895,000	31,926,000	18.5
Vietnam	1,562,000	95,415,000	1.6
British Virgin Islands	300	31,000	0.8
U.S. Virgin Islands	18,000	107,000	16.6
Yemen	14,859,000	28,120,000	52.8
Zambia	158,000	17,238,000	0.9
Zimbabwe	455,000	16,338,000	2.8

== Association with rates of violence in times of peace ==
Multiple studies show that where people have easy access to firearms, gun-related deaths tend to be more frequent, including by suicide, homicide and unintentional injuries.

Gun-related death rates are positively correlated with household gun ownership rates.

U.S. gun sales have risen steadily in the 21st century, peaking in 2020 during the COVID-19 pandemic. "NICS" is the FBI's National Instant Background Check System.

Annual gun production in the U.S. has increased substantially in the 21st century, after having remained fairly level over preceding decades. By 2023, a majority of U.S. states allowed adults to carry concealed guns in public.

American studies suggest that higher rates of gun ownership are associated with higher homicide rates, although Gary Kleck argues that the highest-quality studies show that gun ownership does not increase homicide rates. Higher rates of gun ownership are also associated with higher suicide rates and higher accidental gun death rates. The availability of illegal guns, but not that of legal guns, is associated with higher rates of violent crime.

An international study by UNICRI researchers from 2001 examined the link between household gun ownership and overall homicide, overall suicide, as well as gun homicide and gun suicide rates amongst 21 high-income countries. Significant correlations between household gun ownership and rates of gun suicides for both genders, and gun homicide rates involving female victims were found. There were no significant correlations detected for total homicide and suicide rates, as well as gun homicide rates involving male victims, gun homicide rates when including both genders, or overall female homicide rates. This study has been criticized for combining high-income countries (like the United States) with middle-income countries (like Estonia); if middle-income countries are excluded from the analysis, a strong relationship emerges between gun ownership and homicide. However the Hemenway study has been criticized in response as well. When removing the United States as an outlier and using the superior proxy of gun ownership in his study (percentage of firearm suicides over all suicides), the relationship ceases to be statistically significant. The significant association between gun ownership and homicide rates across highly developed nations is dependent solely on the inclusion of the U.S. Studies in Canada that examined the levels of gun ownership by province have found no correlations with provincial overall suicide rates. A 2011 study conducted looking at the effects of gun control legislation passed in Canada and the associated effects in homicide rates found no significant reductions in homicide rates as a result of legislation. A case-control study conducted in New Zealand looking at household gun ownership and the risk of suicides found no significant associations.

== Maps ==
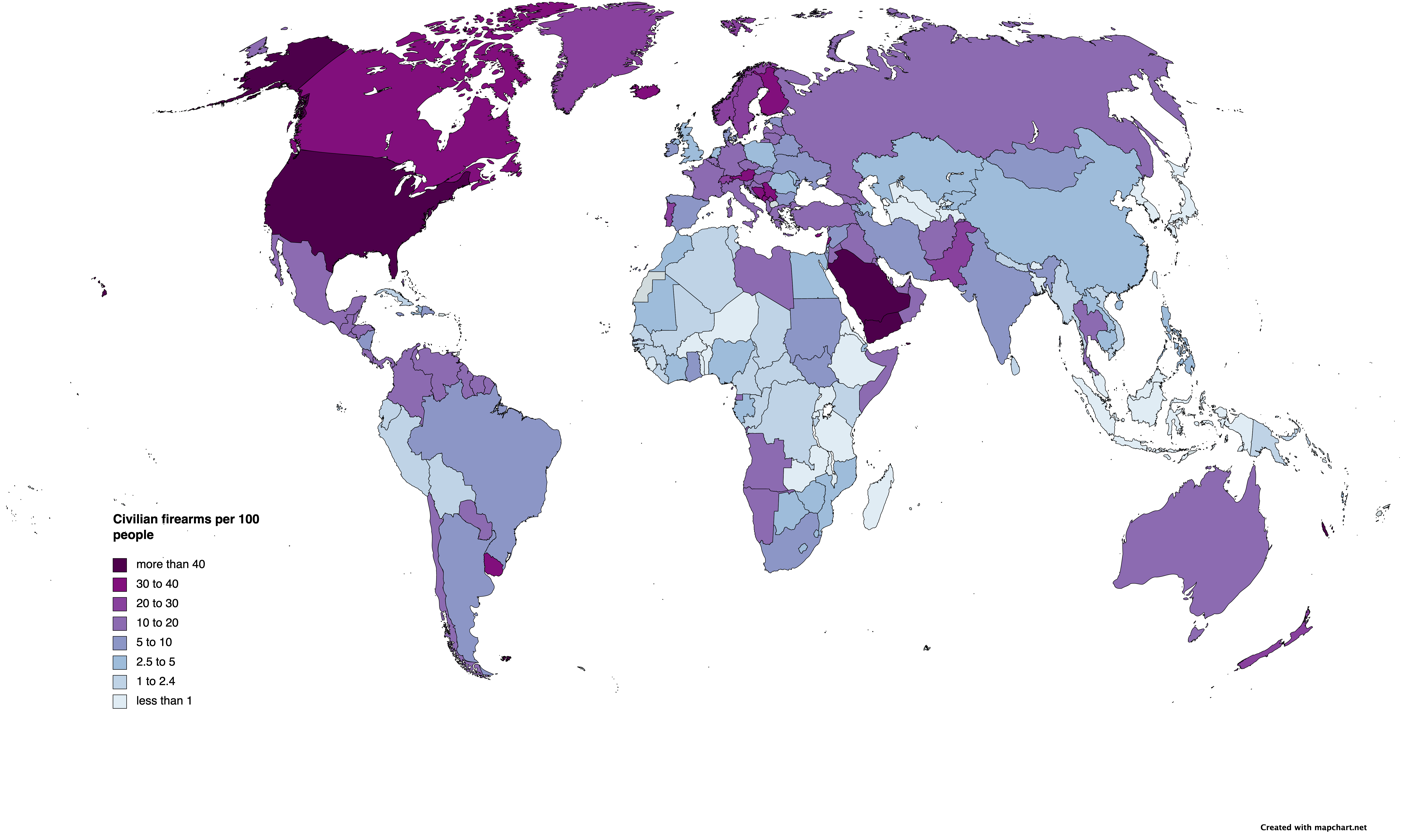
Map of countries by estimated civilian firearms per capita

Percent of households with guns in 2016. RAND Corporation.

== See also ==
- Gun control
- Gun violence
- Index of gun politics articles
- Percent of households with guns by country
- Estimated number of civilian guns per capita by country
