= Gun laws in Lithuania =

View source data.
Number of registered arms in Lithuania by year (in thousands)

Lithuanian law allows firearm possession on a shall-issue basis. With approximately 13.6 civilian firearms per 100 people, Lithuania is 58th most armed country in the world.

== History ==
When Lithuania was part of the Soviet Union, firearm possession was tightly controlled and most citizens were not allowed to keep firearms. In 1990, Mikhail Gorbachev ordered confiscation of all weapons in Lithuania.

In 1993 Lithuania allowed possession of firearms for purposes of self-defense on a may-issue basis – the applicant needed to demonstrate a danger to one's life. In 1997 this requirement was abolished, making the process shall-issue. In 2002 Lithuania passed new firearm law which is still in force today with some amendments. Since then number of legal firearms began to rise, doubling from 61,544 in 2002 to 127,984 in 2017.

== Current law ==
Lithuanian law allows firearm possession for the following purposes:

- Hunting;
- Sport shooting;
- Self-defense;
- Professional activities;
- Collection;
- Training;
- Scientific research;
- Other (at discretion of police).

The minimum age to own firearms is 23 for self-defense handguns, 21 for semi-automatic rifles, 18 years for semi-automatic shotguns and smooth-bore self-defense weapons and 16 years for sporting firearms. Every permanent resident of Lithuania of minimum age who passes the examination has the right to possess firearms for self-defense purposes. Article 12(5) forbids police from refusing granting license without valid reason. Any such refusal may be appealed in court.

Carrying firearms is allowed with a permit to carry. Police also must have good reason to refuse such permit as per Article 40.6. There should be no round in the chamber while carrying, except revolvers, which should not be cocked with the exception of direct threat to the person’s health or life.

Explosive missiles, mortars and flame throwers are prohibited.

== Firearm possession ==
As of 2019 there are 173,680 (or 6 per 100 people) registered firearms in Lithuania owned by 94,352 people including 37,473 rifles, 47,796 smoothbore long guns, 34,016 gas handguns, 30,165 pistols, 19,684 revolvers and 4,564 other kinds of firearms.

== Gun crime ==
View source data.
Homicides using firearms (blue) and all homicides (orange) in Lithuania by year

Between 1995 and 2018 number of homicides using firearms has fallen by more than 98% from 252 to four, while overall number of homicides has fallen by 85% from 505 to 72.

== See also ==
- Overview of gun laws by nation
