= Gun law in Guatemala =

View source data.
Registered firearms in Guatemala by year (in thousands)

Guatemalan law allows firearm possession on shall-issue basis as a constitutional right. With approximately 12 civilian firearms per 100 people, Guatemala is the 70th most armed country in the world.

== Constitution ==
Guatemalan constitution protects right to own guns for home-defense:

The right to own weapons for personal use, not prohibited by the law, in the place of in habitation, is recognized. There will not be an obligation to hand them over, except in cases ordered by a competent judge.

— Article 38 of Guatemala Constitution

== Law ==
Current law regarding firearm possession was passed in 2009.

=== Permitted types of firearms ===
Law allows civilians to own following types of firearms:

- Semi automatic pistols and revolvers of any calibre;
- Shotguns with barrel of length up to 24 inches;
- Mechanical and semi-automatic rifles.

=== Firearm registration ===
Simple possession requires registration of gun. Application for register must include:

- Certification proving ownership and legal acquisition of the firearm;
- Certification of lack of a criminal and police record in force (6 months of validity);
- Identity document;
- 4x4 photography on matte paper;
- Receipt of payment of all necessary fees;
- Presentation of firearm.

Guatemalans are allowed possess any number of firearms.

=== Carrying firearms ===
Rules regarding carrying firearms are more strict with additional permit required and minimum age being 25 years. Only about 10% of legal guns can be carried in public places.

== Firearm possession ==
Currently there are 547,000 registered firearms in Guatemala (or 3 per 100 people). 60,658 people have license to carry them.

== See also ==
- Overview of gun laws by nation
