= Gun control in Ukraine =

Ukrainian laws regarding firearms

Ukrainian law allows firearm ownership on may-issue basis. With approximately 10 civilian firearms per 100 people, Ukraine is the 88th most armed country in the world per capita, and 22nd overall.

== Law ==
Ukraine is the only country in Europe where firearms are not regulated by statute. Everything related to firearms is regulated by Order №622 of the Ministry of Internal Affairs.

Citizens are permitted to own non-fully automatic rifles and shotguns as long as they are stored properly when not in use.

Handguns are illegal except for target shooting, those who hold concealed carry permits, and handguns awarded for service. Concealed carry licenses are available, but are not normally issued unless a threat to life is present and can be proven.

A license is required to own firearms, and a citizen may be issued a license if that person:

- is 25 years of age for rifle ownership, 21 years of age for smoothbore weapon ownership, 18 years of age for cold or pneumatic weapon ownership;
- has no criminal record;
- has no history of domestic violence;
- has no mental illness or history of mental illness;
- has a good reason (target shooting, hunting, collection).

Once a license is issued, all guns must be kept unloaded and in a safe.

Because of the lack of statutes regarding firearm ownership, authorities have great discretion when giving firearm licenses. The president and ministers often give guns to members of the elite, while making it hard for ordinary people to obtain them. It is estimated that more than 50,000 guns have been issued as presents from authorities.

Gun owners are required by order to renew their licenses and registration of their guns every three years. Failure to comply will result in revocation of the license, as well as confiscation of guns. There is a 10-round magazine limit for rifles.

Limited categories of citizens like People's Deputies of Ukraine, judges, journalists and some others may own trauma pistols that fire rubber bullets.

On February 23, 2022, immediately before the 2022 Russian invasion of Ukraine and a declaration of a state of emergency the Ukrainian parliament approved a law which gives citizens the right to carry weapons outside their homes for the purpose of self defense.

On February 24, 2022 Ukrainian president Volodymyr Zelenskyy said "We will give weapons to anyone who wants to defend the country. Be ready to support Ukraine in the squares of our cities" in a tweet. As of February 26, 2022 over 25,000 automatic rifles, 10 million rounds of ammunition and unknown number of RPGs have been handed out to civilians according to Interior Minister Denis Monastyrsky. All one needs to get a rifle is an I.D. card. Open training has been organized for civilians by war veterans throughout Kyiv.

== Firearm ownership ==
According to the database of the National Police of Ukraine there are 892,854 registered firearms in Ukraine as of July 31, 2018. Small Arms Survey estimates that there are 3,596,000 illegal firearms in Ukraine as of 2017.

== Politics ==
The political parties Svoboda, Right Sector and National Corps have the position that the population should keep and bear arms, as in the United States.

== See also ==
- Overview of gun laws by nation
- Politics of Ukraine
- Law of Ukraine
