= Gun laws in Malta =

View source data.
Number of registered arms in Malta by year (in thousands)

Maltese law allows possession of various types of firearms on shall-issue basis. With approximately 28 civilian firearms per 100 people, Malta is the 18th most armed country in the world.

== History ==
In 1931, the "Arms Ordnance" was enacted under British colonial rule which allowed firearm possession on may-issue basis.

In 2005 new firearm law was passed and went into effect in 2006. The law removed police's discretion in granting firearm licenses. In 2013, the law was amended once again changing some firearm categories, for example requiring a license to own blank-firing guns and eliminating license requirements for harpoons.

== Current law ==
Maltese law divides firearm licenses into following categories:

- Target Shooting License A;
- Target Shooting License B;
- Collection License A;
- Collection License B.

To get a firearm license one must join a shooting or collectors club for training, which will issue a recommendation letter for the police, after which applicants must pass knowledge on firearm safety and the Arms Act. After successfully completing every step, one will get a license. Carrying loaded firearms outside of hunting grounds or a shooting range is illegal. Fully automatic firearms are allowed only if they were produced before 1946.

== Firearm ownership ==
There are 129,423 registered firearms (or 25 per 100 people) in Malta, including 66,000 shotguns, 18,992 pistols, 17,241 rifles, 7,552 revolvers, 1,023 tactical shotguns, 705 submachine guns, 565 general purpose machine guns, 43 assault rifles, 28 cannons, 11 firearms concealed in walking sticks, four mortars and two rocket launchers. They are owned by 39,143 registered firearm owners.

== See also ==
- Overview of gun laws by nation
