= Geneva Declaration on Armed Violence and Development =

The Geneva Declaration on Armed Violence and Development highlights the role that states and civil society must play in preventing and reducing violence associated with war, crime, and social unrest. The Declaration was adopted on 7 June 2006 and is now endorsed by 113 states. It is the strongest political statement to date that addresses the impact of armed violence within a development context. Regular high-level diplomatic regional meetings and ministerial review conferences take place to assess progress concerning the process and implementation of the Geneva Declaration; the first two ministerial review conferences took place in 2008 and 2011. During 2014 a series of Regional Review Conferences have been organized not only to review the process in implementing the Geneva Declaration but also to reflect and gather support in integrating meaningfully armed violence reduction in national and international development processes, including the post-2015 development agenda.

== Overview ==
By signing the Geneva Declaration states commit to:

- Support initiatives to measure the human, social and economic costs of armed violence;
- Undertake assessments to understand and respond to risks and vulnerabilities;
- Evaluate the effectiveness of armed violence prevention and reduction programs around the world; and
- To disseminate lessons and best practices.

Understanding that the fight against the global scourge of armed violence and the prospects for sustainable development are closely linked, the signatories recognize that armed violence constitutes a major obstacle to the achievement of the Millennium Development Goals. They agree to strengthen their efforts to integrate armed violence reduction and conflict prevention programs into national, regional, and multilateral development frameworks and strategies.

The approach is based on three pillars:

1. Advocacy: dissemination and coordination initiatives for implementing the Geneva Declaration
2. Measurability: country based armed violence mapping and monitoring to identify entry-points and opportunities for interventions
3. Programming: practical programming on armed violence prevention and reduction

A Core Group of 14 signatory states and affiliated organizations is responsible for steering the process and guiding the implementation of the Geneva Declaration. Affiliated organizations include the Bureau for Crisis Prevention and Recovery (BCPR) of the United Nations Development Programme (UNDP), the Small Arms Survey—which also hosts the Geneva Declaration Secretariat—, the Development Assistance Committee (DAC) of the Organisation for Economic Co-operation and Development (OECD), and the Quaker United Nations Office (QUNO).

Core group member states:

- Brazil
- Colombia
- Finland
- Guatemala
- Indonesia
- Kenya
- Morocco
- The Netherlands
- Norway
- The Philippines
- Spain
- Switzerland (coordinating country)
- Thailand
- United Kingdom

Signatory states:

- Afghanistan (2006)
- Albania (2008)
- Angola (2007)
- Argentina (2007)
- Australia (2006)
- Austria (2006)
- Bangladesh (2008)
- Belgium (2011)
- Benin (2007)
- Bosnia and Herzegovina (2006)
- Brazil (2006)
- Brunei (2008)
- Bulgaria (2006)
- Burkina Faso (2007)
- Burundi (2007)
- Canada (2006)
- Cameroon (2007)
- Chad (2014)
- Chile (2006)
- Colombia (2008)
- Congo, Democratic Republic of the (2007)
- Costa Rica (2006)
- Côte d'Ivoire (2007)
- Croatia (2008)
- Cyprus (2009)
- Denmark (2008)
- Dominican Republic (2007)
- Ecuador (2007)
- El Salvador (2006)
- Ethiopia (2007)
- Fiji (2008)
- Finland (2006)
- France (2006)
- Georgia (2008)
- Germany (2006)
- Ghana (2006)
- Greece (2006)
- Guatemala (2006)
- Guinea (2011)
- Guyana (2008)
- Holy See (2006)
- Honduras (2006)
- Hungary (2006)
- Iceland (2007)
- Indonesia (2006)
- Ireland (2006)
- Italy (2007)
- Jamaica (2006)
- Japan (2006)
- Jordan (2006)
- Kazakhstan (2008)
- Kenya (2006)
- Korea, North (2008)
- Korea, South (2006)
- Kyrgyzstan (2008)
- Lebanon (2006)
- Lesotho (2007)
- Liberia (2006)
- Libya (2007)
- Liechtenstein (2008)
- Lithuania (2009)
- Luxembourg (2009)
- Macedonia, Republic of (2009)
- Madagascar (2007)
- Malawi (2007)
- Malaysia (2008)
- Mali (2006)
- Mauritius (2007)
- Mexico (2006)
- Mongolia (2008)
- Montenegro (2008)
- Morocco (2006)
- Mozambique (2006)
- Nauru (2008)
- Nepal (2008)
- Netherlands (2006)
- New Zealand (2006)
- Nicaragua (2009)
- Niger (2007)
- Nigeria (2006)
- Norway (2006)
- Palau (2008)
- Panama (2007)
- Papua New Guinea (2006)
- Peru (2007)
- Philippines (2008)
- Portugal (2006)
- Qatar (2006)
- Romania (2008)
- Rwanda (2007)
- Samoa (2008)
- Senegal (2006)
- Serbia (2008)
- Sierra Leone (2006)
- Slovakia (2008)
- Slovenia (2006)
- Solomon Islands (2008)
- South Africa (2006)
- Spain (2007)
- Sudan (2007)
- Sweden (2006)
- Switzerland (2006)
- Tajikistan (2008)
- Thailand (2006)
- Timor-Leste (2006)
- Togo (2011)
- Uganda (2007)
- United Arab Emirates (2011)
- United Kingdom (2006)
- Uzbekistan (2008)
- Vanuatu (2008)
- Zambia (2007)
- Zimbabwe (2007)

== See also ==
- Armed violence reduction
- Small Arms Survey
