= Keith Krause =

Canadian political scientist (born 1960)

- Born: 15 June 1960 (age 66)
- Education: University of Alberta, Balliol College, Oxford
- Known for: His works on small arms
- Scientific career
- Fields: International security, armed violence, multilateral security cooperation
- Workplaces: Graduate Institute of International and Development Studies

Keith Krause (born 15 June 1960) is a Canadian political scientist known for his work on international security and armed violence.

== Background ==
Krause was a Rhodes Scholar at Balliol College, Oxford where he got his MPhil and DPhil. Since 1994, Krause is Professor of political science at the Graduate Institute of International and Development Studies in Geneva. Since 1999, Krause is also the Director of the Centre on Conflict, Development and Peacebuilding at that same institution.

== Work ==
Krause is the founder Small Arms Survey, whose flagship publication is an annual review of global small arms issues such as production and stockpiles.

== Publications (selection) ==
- The Global Burden of Armed Violence 2011: Lethal Encounters (Cambridge: Cambridge University Press, 2011). Co-edited (with Elisa Gilgen and Robert Muggah), co-wrote one chapter.
- Armed Groups and Contemporary Conflicts: Challenging the Weberian State (London: Routledge, 2010). Editor.
- The Global Burden of Armed Violence (Geneva: Geneva Declaration Secretariat, 2008). Conceptualized project, commissioned chapters and research, co-edited chapters, co-wrote introduction.
- Critical Security Studies (Minneapolis: University of Minnesota Press, 1997). Edited with Michael C. Williams.
- With W. Andy Knight. State, Society and the United Nations System: Changing Perspectives on Multilateralism. UN University Press, 1995.
- Arms and the State: Patterns of Military Production and Trade. Cambridge Studies in International Relations. Cambridge University Press, 1995. ISBN 978-0-521-55866-2
- With Michael C. Williams. Critical Security Studies: Concepts And Strategies. Routledge, 1997. ISBN 978-1-85728-733-2
- Editor of Culture and Security: Multilateralism, Arms Control and Security Building. Contemporary Security Studies. Taylor & Francis Ltd, 1999. ISBN 978-0-7146-4437-0
