= W. Andy Knight =

Political scientist

- Awards: Harry Jerome Trailblazer Award (2010); Fellow of the Royal Society of Canada (2011); Distinguished Professor (2021)

Academic background
- Education: McMaster University (BA, 1983); Dalhousie University (MA, 1986); York University (PhD, 1995)

Academic work
- Discipline: Political science
- Institutions: University of the West Indies (2013–2016); University of Alberta

W. Andy Knight is a political scientist at the University of Alberta, where he was named a Distinguished Professor in March 2021. He is also a Fellow of the Royal Society of Canada and has held executive roles are multiple institutions, including the University of the West Indies.

== Education ==
Knight received a Bachelor of Arts in fine arts and political science from McMaster University in 1983, a Master of Arts in political science from Dalhousie University in 1986, and a Doctor of Philosophy in international relations from York University in 1995.

== Career ==
Knight began his career as an assistant professor at Bishop's University from 1993 to 1998.

He joined the University of Alberta as an associate professor in 1998, a position he held until 2000, at which point he was promoted to full professor. From 2006 to 2009, he was director of the Peace and Post Conflict Studies Certificate Programme, after which he chaired the Department of Political Science until 2012. While at the University of Alberta, Knight also spent time as a professor and director of the Institute of International Relations at the University of the West Indies from 2013-2016.

Knight has received multiple honors throughout his career. In 2010, he received the Harry Jerome Trailblazer Award from the Black Business and Professional Association. The following year, he was named a Fellow of the Royal Society of Canada. In March 2021, the University of Alberta named Knight a Distinguished Professor.

== Books ==
=== As author ===
- Krause, Keith; Knight, W. Andy, eds. (1995). State, Society and the UN System: Changing Perspectives on Multilateralism. Tokyo ; New York: United Nations University Press. ISBN 978-92-808-0885-8.
- Knight, W. Andry (1998). The United Nations and Arms Embargoes Verification. Mellen Press.
- Knight, W. Andy (2000). A Changing United Nations: Multilateral Evolution and the Quest for Global Governance. Palgrave Macmillan UK. doi:10.1057/9780333984420. ISBN 978-1-349-42119-0.
- Knight, W. Andy; Keating, Thomas F. (2010). Global Politics: Emerging Networks, Trends and Challenges. Oxford University Press Canada. ISBN 978-0-19-541717-3.
- Narozhna, Tanya; Knight, W. Andy (2016). Female Suicide Bombings: A Critical Gender Approach. University of Toronto Press. ISBN 978-1-4875-2004-5.

=== As editor ===
- Knight, W. Andy, ed. (2001). Adapting the United Nations to a Post-Modern Era: Lessons Learned. Palgrave Macmillan. doi:10.1057/9780333977774. ISBN 978-0-333-97777-4.
- Keating, Thomas F.; Knight, W. Andy, eds. (2004). Building Sustainable Peace. Edmonton: University of Alberta Press. ISBN 978-0-88864-414-5.
- Masciulli, Joseph; Molchanov, Mikhail A.; Knight, W. Andy, eds. (2009). The Ashgate Research Companion to Political Leadership. Ashgate. ISBN 978-0-7546-7182-4.
- Knight, W. Andy; Egerton, Frazer, eds. (2012). The Routledge Handbook of the Responsibility to Protect. Routledge. ISBN 978-1-138-83187-2.
- Knight, W. Andy; Castro Rea, Julián; Ghany, Hamid A., eds. (2014). Re-mapping the Americas: Trends in Region-making. Ashgate. ISBN 978-1-4094-6402-0.
- Mahdavi, Mojtaba; Knight, W. Andy (2016). Towards the Dignity of Difference?: Neither 'End of History' nor 'Clash of Civilizations'. Taylor & Francis Group. ISBN 978-1-138-26170-9.
