= Percent of households with guns by country =

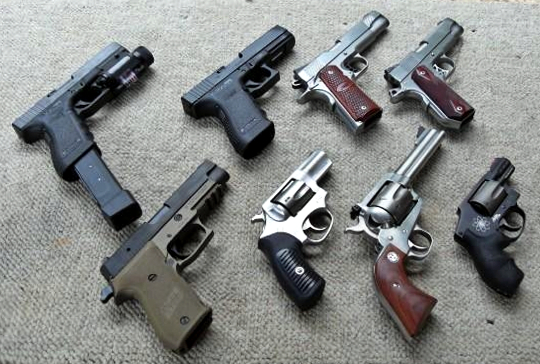
Modern handguns (clockwise from top left) Glock 22 * Glock 21 * Kimber Stainless Raptor II * Dan Wesson Commander Classic Bobtail * Smith & Wesson Model 340 * Ruger Blackhawk * Ruger SP101 * SIG Sauer P220 Combat.

This is a list of countries by the estimated percent of households with guns. It is further broken down by the estimated percent of households with handguns. Also, by the estimated percent of adults living in armed households. The data is from GunPolicy.org which is hosted by the Sydney Medical School, at the University of Sydney in Australia. GunPolicy.org consolidates this data from various sources. To avoid problems with vetting the data for hundreds of countries from hundreds of sources, the table below only uses data compiled by GunPolicy.org.See also: Estimated number of civilian guns per capita by country. It provides estimates of the total number of civilian guns in a country. It then calculates the number per 100 people. This number for a country does not indicate the percentage of the population that possesses guns. This is because individuals can possess more than one gun.

== Country table ==
Sources column (Refs) links to the specific country pages at GunPolicy.org

Percent of households with firearms. Percent of households with handguns. Percent of adults in armed households.
Location	Year	Firearm %	Year	Handgun %	Year	Adults %	Refs
Albania			2012	6.5			
Argentina	2008	15					
Australia	2005	6.2	2005	0.3			
Austria	2005	15.1	2005	5.6	2015	7	
Belgium	2010	5.1	2005	5.2	2015	3	
Bosnia & Herzegovina	2010	34	2012	4.6			
Bulgaria	2005	9.7	2005	6.6	2015	7	
Canada	2005	15.5	2005	2.9			
Croatia			2012	4.3	2015	6	
Denmark	2005	12.6	2005	1.2	2015	7	
Estonia	2005	7.0	2005	3.6	2015	3	
Finland	2005	37.9	2005	6.3	2015	13	
France	2005	16.1	2005	3.7	2015	7	
Germany	2005	12.5	2005	4.2	2015	5	
Greece	2005	20.6	2005	1.4	2015	7	
Hungary	2005	10.4	2005	2.2	2015	3	
Iceland	2005	23.5	2005	1.4			
Ireland	2005	12.4	2005	1.0	2015	6	
Italy	2005	12.9	2005	5.3	2015	6	
Japan	2005	0.8	2005	0.0			
Luxembourg	2005	12.3	2005	7.0	2015	5	
Mexico			2005	2.8			
Netherlands	2005	4.8	2005	1.3	2015	1	
New Zealand	2005	16.6	2005	0.6			
Northern Ireland	2005	12.7	2005	2.1			
Norway	2005	26.1	2005	3.7			
Poland	2005	4.4	2005	0.9	2015	2	
Portugal	2005	18.3	2005	3.9	2015	6	
Scotland	2005	6.7	2005	0.7			
Spain	2005	12.0	2005	0.5	2015	5	
Sweden	2010	16	2005	1.6	2015	8	
Switzerland	2005	28.6	2005	10.3			
United Kingdom	2005	6.0	2005	0.4	2015	2	
United States	2017	42.0	2012	21.9			

== See also ==
- Gun politics
- Small arms trade
- Small Arms and Light Weapons
- List of countries by firearm-related death rate
- Index of gun politics articles
- List of countries by intentional homicide rate
- Overview of gun laws by nation
- Long gun
- Handgun
- Category: Firearms
