= Gun law in Kuwait =

Gun laws in Kuwait include stringent gun control. The law allows a person to obtain a firearms license if:

1. They are a Kuwait citizen; or a foreigner receiving permission by the Minister of Interior
2. Older than 25 years old
3. Capable of handling a weapon without hindrance
4. Do not have criminal records
5. Is not a suspect or under police surveillance
6. Has an income
7. Not homeless
8. Application should be submitted to the Minister of Interior through the General Department of Criminal Evidence.

Usually hunting shotguns are the most common licensed weapons in Kuwait also the easiest to get it licensed, hunting and sniper rifles are more difficult to be licensed but firearms chambered for .22 LR are more commonly licensed, whether with threaded or unthreaded barrel

Automatic rifles or machine guns are not allowed to be licensed in Kuwait but many houses do have such illegal weapons that are either taken by the Kuwaiti resistance of the Iraqi invasion in 1990 or taken during the end of Gulf War when the Iraqi army retreated.

In 2025, Kuwait amended its 1991 firearms law to restrict the possession of air guns.
