= San Francisco de Becerra =

- Municipality
- Location within Honduras
- Coordinates: 14°38′N 86°06′W
- Country: Honduras
- Department: Olancho
- Villages: 7

Area
  - Total: 332.92 km^{2} (128.54 sq mi)
- Elevation: 407 m (1,335 ft)

Population (2015)
  - Total: 9,878
  - Density: 29.67/km^{2} (76.85/sq mi)

San Francisco de Becerra (Spanish pronunciation: [saɱ fɾanˈsisko ðe βeˈsera]) is a municipality in the interior of the Honduran department of Olancho, slightly to the south. It is bordered by Juticalpa in the west and Catacamas in the east.

== Demographics ==
At the time of the 2013 Honduras census, San Francisco de Becerra municipality had a population of 9,475. Of these, 97.20% were Mestizo, 1.56% White, 0.93% Black or Afro-Honduran, 0.30% Indigenous and 0.01% others.

== Sports ==
Local football club Alianza de Becerra play in the Honduran second division.
