= Small Arms Survey =

Swiss research project

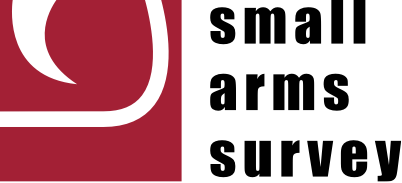
- Formation: 1999
- Headquarters: Geneva
- Director: Mark Downes
- Parent organization: Graduate Institute of International and Development Studies
- Website: https://www.smallarmssurvey.org/

The Small Arms Survey (SAS) is an independent research project located at the Graduate Institute of International and Development Studies in Geneva, Switzerland. It provides information on all aspects of small arms and armed violence, as a resource for governments, policy-makers, researchers, and activists, as well as research on small arms issues.

The survey monitors national and international initiatives (governmental and non-governmental), and acts as a forum and clearinghouse for the sharing of information. It also disseminates best practice measures and initiatives dealing with small arms issues.

SAS's mandate is to look at all aspects of small arms and armed violence. It provides research and analysis by which to support governments to reduce the incidence of armed violence and illicit trafficking through evidence-based analysis.

The project's staff includes international experts in security studies, political science, law, international public policy, development studies, economics, conflict resolution, and sociology. The staff works closely with a worldwide network of researchers and partners.

== History ==
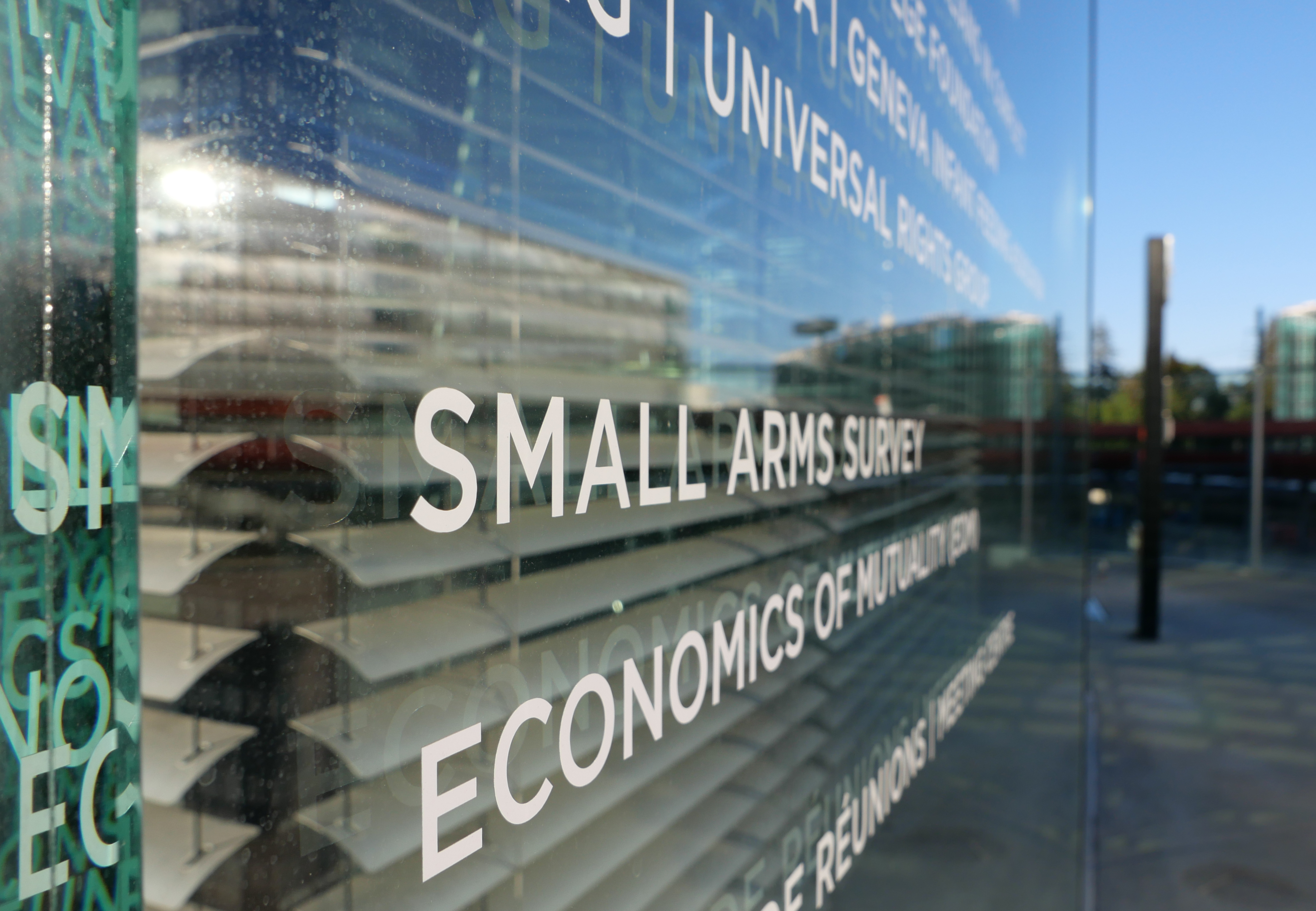
Eastern entrance to Small Arms Survey

The Small Arms Survey was established in 1999 "on the initiative" of Switzerland's Federal Department of Foreign Affairs (FDFA) and "in conjunction with other interested governments". They placed the project under the tutelage of the Graduate Institute of International and Development Studies (IHEID).

In July 1999, Keith Krause became the founder and programme director. The Canadian political scientist, who wrote his PhD thesis at Oxford University on the issue of international arms transfers and has been a professor of international politics at the IHEID since 1994, remained in that position until December 2015.

Beginning in December 2000, Small Arms Survey started publishing its Occasional Papers. The first seven Occasional Papers were written by; Eric Berman, Glenn McDonald, Camilla Waszink, Katherine Kramer, Maria Haug, Martin Langvandslien, Lora Lumpe, Nic Marsh, William Godnick, Robert Muggah, Spyros Demetriou, Edward Laurance, and Rachel Stohl.

== Focus projects ==
The Small Arms Survey hosts the Geneva Declaration on Armed Violence and Development Secretariat.

The Small Arms Survey's Human Security Baseline Assessment for Sudan and South Sudan project supports violence reduction initiatives, including disarmament, demobilization, and reintegration programmes, incentive schemes for civilian arms collections and security sector reform, and arms control interventions across Sudan.

The Security Assessment in North Africa project supports efforts to build a more secure environment in North Africa and the Sahel-Sahara region. The project produces evidence-based research and analysis on the availability and circulation of small arms, the dynamics of emerging armed groups, and related insecurity. The research stresses the effects of the recent uprisings and armed conflicts in the region on community safety.

== 2018 report ==
In 2018, Small Arms Survey reported that there are over one billion small arms distributed globally, of which 857 million (about 85 per cent) are in civilian hands. According to Small Arms Survey's estimates, U.S. civilians alone account for 393 million (about 46 per cent) of the worldwide total of civilian held firearms. This amounts to "120.5 firearms for every 100 residents."

According to the report, the world's armed forces control about 133 million (about 13 per cent) of the global total of small arms, of which over 43 per cent belong to two countries: the Russian Federation (30.3 million) and China (27.5 million). And, the world's law enforcement agencies control about 23 million (about 2 per cent) of the global total of small arms.

=== Global distribution of firearms ===
Small Arms Survey estimates of worldwide firearms holdings, 2017
Location	Civilian held firearms	Population 2017	Civilian held firearms per 100 persons	Military held firearms	Law enforcement held firearms
Total firearms = approximately 1,013,000,000	857,000,000	-	-	133,000,000	23,000,000
Afghanistan	4,270,000	34,169,000	12.5	331,170	239,000
Albania	350,000	2,911,000	12.0	21,750	19,000
Algeria	877,000	41,064,000	2.1	637,720	363,000
American Samoa	400	56,000	0.7	-	90
Andorra	10,000	69,000	14.1	-	976
Angola	2,982,000	26,656,000	11.2	203,300	60,000
Antigua and Barbuda	5,000	94,000	5.4	438	800
Argentina	3,256,000	44,272,000	7.4	679,770	391,000
Armenia	186,000	3,032,000	6.1	509,240	18,000
Aruba	3,000	105,000	2.6	-	700
Australia	3,573,000	24,642,000	14.5	214,520	69,000
Austria	2,577,000	8,592,000	30.0	240,880	37,900
Azerbaijan	362,000	9,974,000	3.6	537,920	18,000
Bahamas	74,000	397,000	18.8	2,470	5,000
Bahrain	181,000	1,419,000	12.8	25,796	20,000
Bangladesh	659,000	164,828,000	0.4	410,305	333,000
Barbados	10,000	286,000	3.5	1,675	2,000
Belarus	581,000	9,459,000	6.1	780,600	165,000
Belgium	1,451,000	11,444,000	12.7	80,880	78,000
Belize	37,000	375,000	10.0	3,690	2,000
Benin	33,000	11,459,000	0.3	8,700	26,000
Bermuda	3,000	61,000	4.6	-	500
Bhutan	6,000	793,000	0.8	15,200	4,000
Bolivia	218,000	11,053,000	2.0	87,590	42,000
Bosnia and Herzegovina	1,185,000	3,793,000	31.2	27,300	29,000
Botswana	97,000	2,344,000	4.1	17,100	11,000
Brazil	17,510,000	211,243,000	8.3	1,316,300	803,000
Brunei Darussalam	6,000	434,000	1.4	20,220	4,000
Bulgaria	590,000	7,045,000	8.4	176,640	59,400
Burkina Faso	175,000	19,173,000	0.9	43,780	43,000
Burundi	238,000	11,936,000	2.0	75,960	24,278
Cabo Verde (Cape Verde)	31,000	533,000	5.7	2,280	19,000
Cambodia	717,000	16,076,000	4.5	258,670	64,000
Cameroon	510,000	24,514,000	2.1	27,360	15,000
Canada	12,708,000	36,626,000	34.7	233,949	103,000
Cayman Islands	6,000	62,000	9.2	-	400
Central African Republic	94,000	5,099,000	1.8	8,580	10,000
Chad	151,000	14,965,000	1.0	25,020	34,000
Channel Islands	23,000	165,000	14.0	-	500
Chile	2,220,000	18,313,000	12.1	311,900	66,000
China	49,735,000	1,388,233,000	3.6	27,466,400	1,971,000
China, Macao SAR	22,000	606,000	3.6	-	4,000
Christmas Island	0	2,000	0.0	-	50
Colombia	4,971,000	49,068,000	10.1	350,689	283,000
Comoros	12,000	826,000	1.5	600	2,000
Congo, Republic of	119,000	4,866,000	2.4	12,000	11,000
Costa Rica	493,000	4,906,000	10.0	-	17,000
Côte d'Ivoire (Ivory Coast)	1,049,000	23,816,000	4.4	33,045	15,000
Croatia	576,000	4,210,000	13.7	75,120	39,000
Cuba	234,000	11,390,000	2.1	958,100	42,000
Curaçao	4,000	160,000	2.6	-	600
Cyprus, North	61,000	349,000	17.4	-	2,000
Cyprus, Rep. of	285,000	839,000	34.0	99,000	11,000
Czech Republic	1,323,000	10,555,000	12.5	157,233	76,000
Democratic Republic of Congo	946,000	82,243,000	1.2	161,100	46,000
Denmark	567,000	5,712,000	9.9	124,120	20,000
Djibouti	28,000	911,000	3.1	19,855	5,000
Dominica	5,000	73,000	6.2	-	600
Dominican Republic	795,000	10,767,000	7.4	106,495	46,000
Ecuador	402,000	16,626,000	2.4	253,668	41,000
Egypt	3,931,000	95,215,000	4.1	1,544,750	1,530,000
El Salvador	737,000	6,167,000	12.0	127,840	30,000
England and Wales	2,731,000	58,877,000	4.6	-	28,000
Equatorial Guinea	112,000	894,000	12.5	2,760	2,000
Eritrea	23,000	5,482,000	0.4	668,550	12,000
Estonia	65,000	1,306,000	5.0	38,760	18,000
Ethiopia	377,000	104,345,000	0.4	525,600	79,000
Falkland Islands (Malvinas)	2,000	3,000	62.1	-	30
Faroe Islands	5,000	49,000	9.9	-	200
Fiji	5,000	903,000	0.5	16,700	2,000
Finland	1,793,000	5,541,000	32.4	475,030	14,000
France	12,732,000	64,939,000	19.6	566,430	497,000
French Guiana	55,000	283,000	19.6	–	2,000
French Polynesia	7,000	289,000	2.5	-	400
Gabon	61,000	1,801,000	3.4	5,640	4,000
Gambia	137,000	2,120,000	6.5	1,080	5,000
Georgia	402,000	3,973,000	10.1	63,950	41,000
Germany	15,822,000	80,636,000	19.6	483,016	466,000
Ghana	2,280,000	28,657,000	8.0	18,600	28,000
Gibraltar	1,000	32,000	4.1	-	600
Greece	1,920,000	10,893,000	17.6	642,510	99,000
Greenland	13,000	56,000	22.3	–	300
Grenada	5,000	108,000	4.6	–	1,000
Guadeloupe	40,000	472,000	8.5	-	2,000
Guam	20,000	174,000	11.5	-	500
Guatemala	2,062,000	17,005,000	12.1	160,600	43,000
Guinea	130,000	13,291,000	1.0	23,080	13,000
Guinea-Bissau	29,000	1,933,000	1.5	10,260	4,000
Guyana	122,000	774,000	15.8	10,890	4,000
Haiti	291,000	10,983,000	2.6	380	15,000
Holy See	0	1,000	0.0	-	200
Honduras	1,171,000	8,305,000	14.1	107,720	29,000
Hong Kong SAR, China	265,000	7,402,000	3.6	-	28,000
Hungary	1,023,000	9,788,000	10.5	147,880	17,000
Iceland	106,000	334,000	31.7	650	590
India	71,101,000	1,342,513,000	5.3	3,900,000	1,700,000
Indonesia	82,000	263,510,000	0.0	1,711,450	429,000
Iran, Islamic Republic of	5,890,000	80,946,000	7.3	3,333,550	98,000
Iraq	7,588,000	38,654,000	19.6	611,000	56,000
Ireland	342,000	4,749,000	7.2	26,636	3,000
Israel	557,000	8,323,000	6.7	1,016,900	41,000
Italy	8,609,000	59,798,000	14.4	502,960	273,000
Jamaica	246,000	2,813,000	8.8	8,681	12,000
Japan	377,000	126,045,000	0.3	745,514	252,000
Jordan	1,473,000	7,877,000	18.7	286,450	60,000
Kazakhstan	504,000	18,064,000	2.8	375,690	65,000
Kenya	750,000	48,467,000	1.5	45,790	51,527
Kiribati	900	116,000	0.8	-	200
Korea, DPR (North)	76,000	25,405,000	0.3	8,363,100	76,000
Korea, Republic of (South)	79,000	50,705,000	0.2	2,688,020	115,000
Kosovo	436,000	1,831,000	23.8	9,500	21,000
Kuwait	685,000	4,100,000	16.7	82,580	11,000
Kyrgyzstan	171,000	6,125,000	2.8	145,010	18,000
Lao, People's Democratic Republic	215,000	7,038,000	3.0	224,690	21,000
Latvia	205,000	1,945,000	10.5	27,936	17,000
Lebanon	1,927,000	6,039,000	31.9	130,150	41,000
Lesotho	105,000	2,185,000	4.8	2,400	5,000
Liberia	97,000	4,730,000	2.1	2,520	5,000
Libya	851,000	6,409,000	13.3	-	-
Liechtenstein	11,000	38,000	28.8	-	200
Lithuania	385,000	2,831,000	13.6	81,240	17,000
Luxembourg	110,000	584,000	18.9	2,340	5,000
Macedonia, Former Yugoslav Republic of	621,000	2,083,000	29.8	29,530	21,000
Madagascar	168,000	25,613,000	0.7	25,320	20,000
Malawi	47,000	18,299,000	0.3	24,480	8,400
Malaysia	217,000	31,164,000	0.7	428,170	102,000
Maldives	23,000	376,000	6.2	9,500	3,000
Mali	206,000	18,690,000	1.1	15,800	3,000
Malta	119,000	421,000	28.3	5,547	1,637
Marshall Islands	300	53,000	0.5	-	80
Martinique	34,000	396,000	8.5	-	1,000
Mauritania	120,000	4,266,000	2.8	22,820	10,000
Mauritius	106,000	1,281,000	8.3	4,845	11,000
Mexico	16,809,000	130,223,000	12.9	895,285	591,000
Micronesia, Fed. Sts.	700	106,000	0.7	-	200
Moldova, Republic of	121,000	4,055,000	3.0	98,600	21,000
Monaco	7,000	38,000	19.6	-	1,000
Mongolia	242,000	3,052,000	7.9	323,400	7,000
Montenegro	245,000	626,000	39.1	5,396	8,000
Montserrat	300	5,000	5.4	-	90
Morocco	1,690,000	35,241,000	4.8	588,020	91,000
Mozambique	1,337,000	29,538,000	4.5	60,000	24,000
Myanmar	877,000	54,836,000	1.6	788,900	76,000
Namibia	396,000	2,569,000	15.4	11,880	15,000
Nauru	0	10,000	0.0	-	60
Nepal	444,000	29,187,000	1.5	183,540	62,000
Netherlands	442,000	17,033,000	2.6	108,676	96,000
New Caledonia	115,000	270,000	42.5	-	700
New Zealand	1,212,000	4,605,000	26.3	38,280	13,000
Nicaragua	323,000	6,218,000	5.2	261,800	8,590
Niger	117,000	21,564,000	0.5	11,110	10,000
Nigeria	6,154,000	191,836,000	3.2	224,200	362,400
Northern Ireland	206,000	1,873,000	11.0	-	13,000
Northern Mariana Islands	1,000	56,000	2.6	-	80
Norway	1,537,000	5,331,000	28.8	188,646	13,000
Oman	792,000	4,741,000	16.7	118,360	31,000
Pakistan	43,917,000	196,744,000	22.3	2,315,480	944,000
Palau	100	22,000	0.5	-	30
Palestinian Territories	56,000	4,952,000	1.1	44,410	33,000
Panama	436,000	4,051,000	10.8	-	30,000
Papua New Guinea	79,000	7,934,000	1.0	7,200	4,800
Paraguay	1,140,000	6,812,000	16.7	235,780	21,000
Peru	633,000	32,166,000	2.0	473,400	142,000
Philippines	3,776,000	103,797,000	3.6	454,700	139,043
Poland	968,000	38,564,000	2.5	307,200	188,000
Portugal	2,186,000	10,265,000	21.3	333,640	89,000
Puerto Rico	422,000	3,679,000	11.5	-	26,000
Puntland	246,000	1,995,000	12.3	3,600	8,000
Qatar	390,000	2,338,000	16.7	30,680	5,000
Réunion	171,000	873,000	19.6	-	2,000
Romania	506,000	19,238,000	2.6	240,180	251,000
Russian Federation	17,620,000	143,375,000	12.3	30,272,900	2,432,000
Rwanda	66,000	12,160,000	0.5	66,500	14,000
Saint Kitts and Nevis	2,000	57,000	3.4	-	600
Saint Lucia	6,000	188,000	3.4	-	1,000
Saint Martin (France)	3,000	32,000	8.5	-	100
Saint Vincent and the Grenadines	4,000	110,000	3.4	-	1,000
Samoa	20,000	196,000	10.1	-	400
San Marino	5,000	32,000	14.4	-	300
São Tomé and Principe	7,000	198,000	3.4	570	100
Saudi Arabia	5,468,000	32,743,000	16.7	481,350	214,000
Scotland	305,000	5,436,000	5.6	-	2,000
Senegal	323,000	16,054,000	2.0	16,320	6,000
Serbia	2,719,000	6,946,000	39.1	384,422	53,100
Seychelles	4,000	98,000	4.1	798	200
Sierra Leone	35,000	6,733,000	0.5	10,200	12,000
Singapore	20,000	5,785,000	0.3	574,140	9,000
Sint Maarten (Netherlands)	2,000	40,000	4.2	-	300
Slovakia	355,000	5,432,000	6.5	33,150	43,000
Slovenia	324,000	2,071,000	15.6	131,686	13,000
Solomon Islands	1,000	606,000	0.2	-	70
Somalia	1,145,000	9,225,000	12.4	37,620	8,000
Somaliland	456,000	3,823,000	11.9	23,750	4,000
South Africa	5,351,000	55,436,000	9.7	350,636	250,481
South Sudan	1,255,000	13,096,000	9.6	351,500	42,000
Spain	3,464,000	46,070,000	7.5	333,660	264,196
Sri Lanka	494,000	20,905,000	2.4	509,700	134,000
Sudan	2,768,000	42,166,000	6.6	590,170	129,000
Suriname	88,000	552,000	15.9	5,985	2,000
Swaziland	64,000	1,320,000	4.8	5,700	4,000
Sweden	2,296,000	9,921,000	23.1	139,180	38,000
Switzerland	2,332,000	8,454,000	27.6	324,484	34,000
Syrian Arab Republic	1,547,000	18,907,000	8.2	655,500	124,000
Taiwan (Republic of China)	10,000	23,405,000	0.0	2,022,150	76,000
Tajikistan	37,000	8,858,000	0.4	56,490	9,000
Tanzania, United Republic of Africa	427,000	56,878,000	0.8	190,050	37,000
Thailand	10,342,000	68,298,000	15.1	1,052,815	230,000
Timor-Leste (East Timor)	3,000	1,237,000	0.3	2,527	4,000
Togo	58,000	7,692,000	0.8	12,850	5,000
Tonga	9,000	108,000	8.0	-	200
Trinidad and Tobago	43,000	1,369,000	3.2	7,695	9,000
Tunisia	123,000	11,495,000	1.1	68,020	73,000
Turkey	13,249,000	80,418,000	16.5	1,390,180	620,000
Turkmenistan	23,000	5,503,000	0.4	184,700	27,000
Turks and Caicos Islands	1,000	35,000	3.3	-	100
Tuvalu	100	10,000	1.2	-	26
Uganda	331,000	41,653,000	0.8	116,660	54,000
Ukraine	4,396,000	44,405,000	9.9	6,600,000	289,000
United Arab Emirates	1,569,000	9,398,000	16.7	163,800	41,000
United Kingdom; Combined civilian, military and law enforcement numbers for (England and Wales), (Northern Ireland) & (Scotland).	3,242,000	66,186,000	4.9	539,680	43,000
United States of America	393,347,000	326,474,000	120.5	4,535,380	1,016,000
Uruguay	1,198,000	3,457,000	34.7	62,130	30,000
Uzbekistan	127,000	30,691,000	0.4	268,400	150,000
Vanuatu	11,000	276,000	3.9	-	350
Venezuela	5,895,000	31,926,000	18.5	353,300	173,000
Vietnam	1,562,000	95,415,000	1.6	3,829,200	285,000
Virgin Islands (U.K.)	300	31,000	0.8	-	500
Virgin Islands (U.S.)	18,000	107,000	16.6	-	300
Yemen	14,859,000	28,120,000	52.8	28,500	-
Zambia	158,000	17,238,000	0.9	41,040	16,000
Zimbabwe	455,000	16,338,000	2.8	91,580	23,000

=== American gun ownership ===
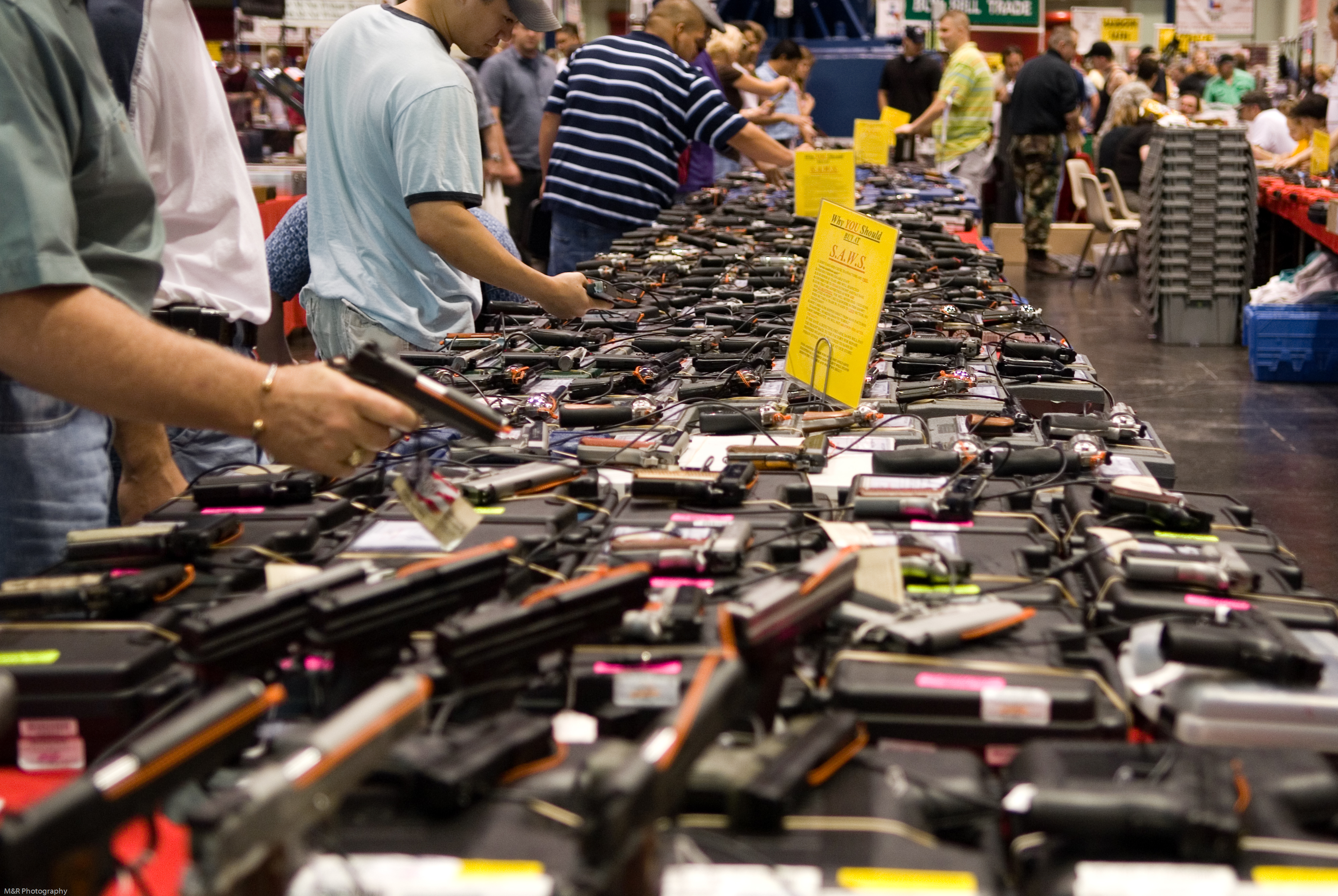
American gun show, Houston, Texas

American civilians own over 393 million guns. "Americans made up 4 percent of the world's population but owned about 46 percent of the entire global stock of 857 million civilian firearms." That is three times as many guns as the combined stockpile of the world's armed forces. American civilians own more guns "than those held by civilians in the other top 25 countries combined."

== Reception ==
The Small Arms Survey's reports are widely used and considered to be accurate, though all of the figures involve "some degree of estimation", and estimates for certain countries are highly uncertain.

In response to a report about the number of firearms in Finland, the Finnish Ministry of the Interior issued a statement saying that the number was inflated and completely wrong.

== Publications ==
The project's flagship publication is the Small Arms Survey, an annual review of global small arms issues such as production, stockpiles, brokering, legal and illicit arms transfers, the effects of small arms, and national, bilateral, and multilateral measures to deal with the problems associated with small arms. Published by Cambridge University Press, it is recognized as the principal international source of impartial and reliable information on all aspects of small arms. It is widely used by policy-makers, government officials and non-governmental organizations.

- The Small Arms Survey 2007, titled Guns in the City.
- The Small Arms Survey 2009, titled Shadows of War.
- The Small Arms Survey 2010, titled Gangs, Groups, and Guns.
- The Small Arms Survey 2011, titled States of Security.
- The Small Arms Survey 2012, titled Moving Targets
- The Small Arms Survey 2013, titled Everyday Dangers
- The Small Arms Survey 2014, titled Women and Guns.
- The Small Arms Survey 2015, titled Weapons and the World.
- The Small Arms Survey 2018, titled Small Arms Survey reveals: More than one billion firearms in the world.
- The Small Arms Survey 2018, titled Estimating Global Civilian Held Firearms Numbers.
- The Small Arms Survey 2018, titled Estimating Global Military Owned Firearms Numbers.
- The Small Arms Survey 2018, titled Estimating Global Law Enforcement Firearms Numbers.

In addition to its annual yearbook, the Small Arms Survey publishes a wide range of periodical research findings. These include a Book Series, Occasional Papers, Special Reports, Working Papers, and short Issue Briefs and Research Notes. These publications present substantial research findings on data, methodological, and conceptual issues related to small arms or detailed country and regional case studies. Most of these are published in hard copy and are also accessible on the project's web site.

== See also ==
- Conflict Armament Research
- Gun ownership
- Gun politics
- Small arms
- Small arms proliferation
