= Firearms regulation in Honduras =

Commerce, ownership, possession and use of firearms in Honduras

In Honduras, the commerce, ownership, possession and use of firearms is regulated. Escalation in crime and the use of firearms in the commission of crimes and homicides has brought political and public discourse to consider regulation of arms.

Up until 1985, there was no official regulation of gun ownership and possession by private citizens although Title III, Chapter IV, Article 94 of the Honduran Constitution of 1965, replaced in 1982, stated No one may possess or carry weapons without the permission of the competent authority. The law shall regulate this provision; while the Constitution of 1957 on Title II, Chapter IV said The inhabitants of the republic can own and carry weapons in accordance with the law.

The current Constitution of Honduras, enacted in 1982, makes no direct mention of the 'right to keep and bear arms' and the role firearms should play as a constitutional right; however, Title V, Chapter X, Article 292 ...reserve[s] as exclusive power of the Armed Forces the manufacturing, import, distribution and sale of arms, ammunition and the like. Other clauses in the Constitution regarding the right of citizens to life and personal safety have served as foundation to the legislation and regulation of individuals' right to possession and the use of firearms.

Until June 2007, openly carrying a firearm in public as well carrying a concealed weapon was permitted but increased attention to deaths by firearm in the country led to further restrictions on the possession of firearms. Current law still makes the purchase, ownership, and possession of firearms legal and it describes the type of firearms permitted for civilian ownership. The 2007 small arms survey shows 6 guns owned per 100 citizens in Honduras.

== History ==
The legal control of the proliferation and of the illegal use of firearms is relatively new in Honduras. Prior to 1985, ownership or possession of a firearm by a private citizen was considered no more than the ownership and possession of any other piece of property. When a crime was committed using a firearm, other than regarding the weapon as evidence to the crime, its possession and use in the crime was not a crime by itself but the act committed, such as murder or robbery, was the violation to prosecute.

In May 1985, when Honduras was transiting from military rule to a democracy, the Regulations for the Possession and Carrying of Weapons, Agreement Number 1029 was passed by the Legislative Power. By the mid 1990s, the administration of police forces was no longer part of the armed forces and therefore gun regulation became a civil task. In July 2000, the Act on the Control of Firearms, Ammunition, Explosives and Other Related Material was enacted, outlining the rights and limitations of citizens regarding weapons. Since then, several reforms to the Act have been passed in an effort to limit the use of firearms in violent crimes, including homicides.

=== Gun culture ===
Hondurans and the laws of Honduras have had an individual freedom centered view on firearms. Guns are carried openly in the countryside as a demonstration of machismo and virility. Citizens of Honduras and non-citizens who are legal residents of the country may own handguns, shotguns, or rifles under the types and calibers permitted by law. Firearms may be used for the purpose of hunting, competition, target practice, home protection, work protection, personal safety and any other hobby or recreational activity permitted by law. Because of the rise in crime, gun ownership in the home, business establishment and while working (such as delivery drivers, taxi drivers, and truckers) has become common. Anyone visiting a city in Honduras will immediately notice armed guards in virtually every establishment including restaurants, grocery stores, and everyday businesses. "No Weapons Allowed" signs can be seen in certain places reminding patrons to leave their firearms at home when conducting business with them. Besides the common frisk when entering a building, some establishments have gone as far as installing metal detectors to make sure visitors are unarmed when entering. Rise in crime has brought some politicians to think the best way to protect citizens is from entirely banning firearms from civilians. In 2009, there were 220,000 registered guns in private ownership in addition to an estimated 500,000 illegal guns. There is an active black market for firearms. Though officially banned, AK-47 rifles can be purchased for about $500.

=== Gun violence ===
Crime has been endemic in Honduras for several years. The high level of violence and killings experienced in the last 20 years led public officials to formulate laws restricting and regulating firearms in the country. In 2008, Honduras held the second highest rate of homicides per 100,000 inhabitants with 78.6 percent of these committed by firearm. As of 2012, Honduras holds the highest homicide rate in the world and San Pedro Sula holds the country's highest homicide rate with 137.5 murders per 100,000 inhabitants. Between 2005 and mid 2010, 79.38 percent of homicides were committed by firearm in the country. The UNDP estimates at least 800,000 guns in the country of which at least 650,000 are unregulated. Authorities believe some 500,000 guns considered weapons of war are in the hands of civilians and criminals. Most of the illegal guns in the country were acquired during the hostile years of the 1980s. The cost of a bullet in Honduras varies from one to eight lempiras (US$0.06 to 0.42).

== Constitutional rights ==
While the Constitution of Honduras make no explicit mention of citizens' right to weapons, it does include the following:

Article 61- The Constitution guarantees Hondurans and foreigners residents in the country the irrevocable right to life, personal safety, freedom, and equality before the law and [the right] to property.

Article 59- The human person is the supreme purpose of society and the State. All have an obligation to respect and protect it. The dignity of human beings is inviolable...

Article 274- The Armed Forces are subject to the provisions of its Constituent Law and other Laws and Regulations governing its operation... It will also cooperate with the institutions of public security, at the request of the Secretary of State in the Office of Security, to combat terrorism, arms trafficking and organized crime, as well as in the protection of the powers of the State and the Court of elections, to request, in its installation and operation.

Article 292- It is reserved as exclusive power of the Armed Forces the manufacturing, import, distribution and sale of arms and ammunition and similar articles.

These articles has been interpreted by the State as having the power to act through legislation to regulate the manufacture, import, distribution and sale of firearms, while recognizing ownership and possession of firearms for the citizens' legitimate defense.

== Licensing and legislation ==
Only citizens of Honduras and foreign citizens who are legal residents of Honduras may purchase, own, possess, or transport any handgun, shotgun, or rifle as permitted and defined under the Act on the Control of Firearms, Ammunition, Explosives and Other Related Materials. A license for every firearm must be obtained and renewed every four years.

=== Current firearm and ammunition law ===
Current private ownership and possession of firearms is regulated under the Ley de Control de Armas de Fuego, Municiones, Explosivos y Otros Similares (Act on the Control of Firearms, Ammunition, Explosives and Other Related Material).

In regard to the right to keep and bear arms, Title I, Chapter I, Article 4 of the Act on the Control of Firearms, Ammunition, Explosives and Other Related Material states:

It is recognized the right of ownership and possession of firearms to citizens and foreign residents who are in full joy of their civil rights and comply with the requirements established by this Law and its regulations.

In regard to what type of firearms are permitted, Title II, Chapter I, Article 7 states:

For the purpose of this law, it is considered permissible in accordance to current regulation, the following self-defense and recreational weapons:

1. Handguns: Revolvers and semiautomatic handguns up to the point-forty five inches (.45) or eleven-point-five millimeter (11.5mm) caliber;
2. Long guns: Rifles and bolt action or semiautomatic carbines up to point-three hundred and eight inches (.308); and
3. Bolt action or semiautomatic shotguns of ten (10), twelve (12), sixteen (16), twenty (20)-gauge or point four hundred and ten (.410) caliber so as long as the barrel is greater than forty-six centimeters (46 cm) or eighteen (18) inches.

In regard to how many firearms a citizen may own, Title III, Chapter II, Article 27 (as reformed though Decreto 69-2007) states:

Every person in exercise of his or her rights as citizen can request a maximum of five (5) licenses to keep and carry up to five (5) firearms, presenting an application with the following:

1. Form with personal information and address,
2. Make, model, serial number, identification of modification of caliber, if any; as well as any other characteristics of the weapon,
3. Proof of ballistic test,
4. Payment of municipal matriculation, and
5. Identification documents

In regard to where and when firearms may be carried, Article 27A was amended to the firearms control law and states:

The legal carry of a firearm by his owner, either apparent or openly, is only allowed in the spaces of private property such as homes, businesses, workshops, ranches, farms and similar only by their owners. It is also permitted to openly carry to employees performing duties of surveillance and security in public and private businesses, industrial, of service, agricultural, and private security, and strictly in the assigned places and time of employment, in compliance with the requirements of identification, use of uniforms, and other required by this or other law.

In regard to the transport of firearms, Article 27A, third paragraph, explains that firearms can be transported on the streets, in public spaces or areas, public transportation and private vehicles when:

...the weapon carried by his owner is kept or contained in a case or container that does that permit its immediate use... and,
...should be kept on the glove compartment or visible storage areas in the vehicle.

In regard to openly carrying firearms in public, Article 27A, fourth paragraph, states:

At no time is permitted to openly carry weapons on the streets, public areas, public transportation vehicles, public institutions or commercial establishments, [of] industrial, of service, recreational, and any other space where people gather, except under the circumstances described on the first paragraph.

In regard to bringing firearms to Honduras, Article 30 makes the possession of a firearm while in transit through Honduras illegal and requires visitors and tourists who will engage in hunting and shooting sport activities to register and request temporary import permits with the Ministry of Security prior to traveling to Honduras.

=== Automatic weapons ===
Under Article 8 of Title II, Chapter I of the Act on the Control of Firearms, Ammunition, Explosives and Other Related Materials, automatic weapons of any kind are forbidden in Honduras, as well as silencers and high-precision guns, such as sniper rifles.

=== Assault rifles ===
In response to the high level of crime and violence experienced in Honduras, in 2003, the government passed a law banning several types of military-issue "assault" rifles from private possession. Legislative Power Decree 101-2003 gave a 90-day grace period to surrender all weapons prohibited under Article 8, along with weapons described in the new law, without fear of criminal or civil prosecution and provided an incentive of 1,000 lempiras (US$52.92) per weapon surrendered.

This law pertains to weapons that found their way onto the black market from military channels; by definition, "assault" rifles are illegal in Honduras if they are capable of fully automatic fire or they fall under the make and model or caliber restricted under Article 2 of Decree 101-2003 which states:

...AK-47 rifle in all its versions. FN FAL and [Argentine] FAP 7.62mm, UZI sub machine gun, M-16 in all its versions, M60 machine gun. Sniper rifle 5.56mm in all its versions. IMI Galil rifle, Heckler & Koch G3 rifle, Beretta 5.56mm in all its versions. M21 for sharpshooters, homemade firearms, and other weapons of war the Secretary of State in the Office of Security and National Defense may consider as such.

Possession of any weapon and ammunition as described above carries a sentence of eight to 10 years in prison and a fine of 5,000 to 10,000 lempiras (US$264.62-$529.24).

=== Decreto No. 69-2007 ===
Increasing crime and violence and deaths by firearm has led the government to further restrict the ownership and possession of firearms by private citizens.

Under Decree Number 69-2007, signed into law on June 29, 2007, private citizens were restricted to register only up to five firearms and are no longer permitted to carry their firearms in public unless they are being transported and in the proper manner.

Additionally, firearms cannot be carried on a motorcycle unless the bearer is a law enforcement officer.

=== National arms registry ===
In April 2002 the National Arms Register was created under the Act on the Control of Firearms, Ammunition, Explosives and Other Related Materials and it requires all citizens and legal residents to register their firearms with the Criminal Investigation Department of the Ministry of Security.

=== Penal code regarding firearms ===
- Armed robbery in Honduras carries a sentence of four to eight years in prison, under Title VII, Chapter I, Articles 217, 218, and 219 of the Penal Code.
- Assaulting with a deadly weapon to a law enforcement official while performing his duties carries a sentence of one to three years in prison, under Title VII, Chapter IX, Article 344 of the Penal Code.
- Brandishing a weapon to pose a threat carries a sentenced of 60 to 90 days in jail, under Third Book, Title II, Article 327 of the Penal Code.
- Possession of a firearm not authorized for civilian use may carry a sentence of three to five years in prison, under Reforma Artículos del Código Penal, Norma º 59-97, of Article 332; with the exception of fully automatic rifles which carry a sentence of 8 to 10 years under Article 4 of the Decree 101-2003.
- Possession of a firearm authorized for civilian use without the proper license and registration will cause confiscation of the weapon, under Reforma Artículos del Código Penal, Norma º 59-97, of Article 332.
- Trafficking arms which are forbidden for civilian use in Honduras carries a sentence of 8 to 10 years in prison, under Article 332A of the Reform Decree 101-2003.
- Trafficking arms which are permitted for civilian use in Honduras carries a sentence of three to six years in prison, under Article 332B of the Reform Decree 125-2003.

== Sales and ownership ==
La Armeria (the Armory) is the only outlet authorized to import and sell firearms in Honduras. It is run by the armed forces and it has 26 branches throughout all major cities in Honduras, serving civilians and law enforcement members with their firearms and ammunition needs.

=== Legal guns for civilians ===
The following firearms are legal for civilian ownership:

1. Revolvers, all make and models, calibers .22, .32, .38, .357 and .44 Magnum,
2. Semiautomatic handguns, all make and models, calibers .22, .25 ACP, .32 ACP, .380 ACP, 9x19mm, .40 S&W, 10mm, and .45 ACP.
3. Rifles, of the hunting or tactical type, calibers .22, .30-30, .223, .243, .270, .stag 9 .30-06 and 8 millimeter,
4. Shotguns, all make and models at least 46 cm or 18-inch barrel length, calibers 10, 12, 16, 20-gauge and .410 Bore,
5. NOTE: Soviet Makarov firearms, regardless of caliber, are illegal in Honduras due to their high volume among criminals. These guns proliferated among the population after the Contra-Nicaraguan Revolution-era.

=== Purchase and ownership of firearms ===
In order to own and carry a firearm in Honduras, the following must be happen:

- The firearm and its caliber must be of the type permitted for civilian ownership.
- The firearm must be acquired legally (either purchased through La Armeria or from a previous owner whose acquisition of the weapon was legal as well+);
- The bearer must apply for a gun license and be granted one for each weapon owned, fee of L300.00 (US$15.87),
- The firearm must pass a ballistic test,
- The firearm must be registered on the bearer's name,
- The firearm and bearer must register on the National Arms Registry, fee of L500.00 (US$29.10)

+People are advised against purchasing used firearms without the knowledge of who is the present owner, as the new bearer may become liable upon the discovery of any crimes the weapon may have been involved in when it goes through a ballistic test prior to being lawfully registered to the person requesting a license.

=== Taking firearms to Honduras ===
No one may bring firearms into Honduras, except for diplomats or individuals participating in shooting or hunting sport events who have obtained a temporary firearm importation permit from the Honduran Ministry of Security prior to their travel to Honduras. Firearms for personal safety or for purposes other than the aforementioned must be purchased locally through La Armería, the government-run firearm and ammunition supplier.

Diplomats or individuals participating in shooting or hunting sport events must request a permit for the importation of firearms before attempting to travel to Honduras. Firearms that arrive without the requisite Honduran permit will be confiscated and the bearer will be prosecuted.
