= Estimated number of civilian guns per capita by country =

Map of civilian guns per 100 people by country from the Small Arms Survey 2017

This is a list of countries by estimated number of privately owned guns per 100 people. The Small Arms Survey 2017 provides estimates of the total number of civilian-owned guns in a country. It then calculates the number per 100 people. This number for a country does not indicate the percentage of the population that owns guns, because single individuals can own multiple guns.

== List of countries by estimated number of guns per 100 people ==
All the numbers in the main column of the table below are from the annex table of Small Arms Survey 2017. The survey's methodology is based on firearms registries, surveys, expert estimates, and comparison to similar countries. The estimates include both licit and illicit firearms. The annex table where all the numbers in the main column come from also includes some sub-national areas and territories such as Northern Ireland, Puerto Rico, Scotland, etc. Region information is based on the United Nations geoscheme.

United Kingdom. (Note: United Kingdom. A GunPolicy.org page has a rate of 5.03 firearms per 100 people in 2017—3.44 registered plus 1.59 illicit—which totals 5.03 per 100 people.) Small Arms Survey 2017 does not have a number for the UK. It only provides numbers for these countries which constitute the UK: Scotland, Northern Ireland, England and Wales.

Ranking by country for civilian-held firearms per 100 population. Small Arms Survey 2017.
Location	Firearms per 100	Region	Subregion	Population 2017	Civilian firearms	Computation method	Registered firearms	Unregistered firearms	Notes
United States	120.5	Americas	North America	326,474,000	393,347,000	1	1,073,743	392,273,257 Est.	(Note: United States. According to the Congressional Research Service, as of 2009 there were roughly twice as many guns per capita in the United States as there were in 1968: more than 300 million guns in all. The vast majority of unregistered firearms in the U.S. are lawfully unregistered; a Federal registry is prohibited by law, and only nine states impose registration requirements upon some or all firearms. See Gun laws in the United States by state for specific details.)
Falkland Islands	62.1	Americas	South America	3,000	2,000	2	1,705	295	
Yemen	52.8	Asia	Western Asia	28,120,000	14,859,000	2	N/A	N/A	
New Caledonia	42.5	Oceania	Melanesia	270,000	115,000	2	55,000	60,000	
Serbia	39.1	Europe	Southern Europe	6,946,000	2,719,000	2	1,186,086	1,532,914	
Montenegro	39.1	Europe	Southern Europe	626,000	245,000	3	103,536	141,464	
Canada	34.7	Americas	North America	36,626,000	12,708,000	2	2,081,442	10,626,558	
Uruguay	34.7	Americas	South America	3,457,000	1,198,000	2	605,313	592,687	
Cyprus	34.0	Asia	Western Asia	839,000	285,000	2	154,327	130,673	
Finland	32.4	Europe	Northern Europe	5,541,000	1,793,000	1	1,542,396	250,604	(Note: Finland. In 2016, there were 1.5 million guns in the official registry.)
Lebanon	31.9	Asia	Western Asia	6,039,000	1,927,000	2	N/A	N/A	
Iceland	31.7	Europe	Northern Europe	334,000	106,000	2	73,000	33,000	
Bosnia and Herzegovina	31.2	Europe	Southern Europe	3,793,000	1,185,000	2	353,000	832,000	
Austria	30.0	Europe	Western Europe	8,592,000	2,577,000	1	837,000	1,740,000	
North Macedonia	29.8	Europe	Southern Europe	2,083,000	621,000	2	169,687	451,313	
Liechtenstein	28.8	Europe	Western Europe	38,000	11,000	3	N/A	N/A	
Norway	28.8	Europe	Northern Europe	5,331,000	1,537,000	2	1,254,638	282,362	(Note: Norway. In 2017, there were 1.49 million guns in the official registry.)
Malta	28.3	Europe	Southern Europe	421,000	119,000	2	96,425	22,575	
Switzerland	27.6	Europe	Western Europe	8,454,000	2,332,000	2	791,719	1,540,281	(Note: Switzerland. In August 2017, there were 876,000 guns in the official registries.)
Czech Republic	27.5	Europe	Central Europe	10,915,839	3,004,047	2	1,104,047	1,900,000 Est.	
New Zealand	26.3	Oceania	Australasia	4,605,000	1,212,000	2	1,200,000	12,000	
Kosovo	23.8	Europe	Southern Europe	1,831,000	436,000	2	43,206	392,794	
Sweden	23.1	Europe	Northern Europe	9,921,000	2,296,000	1	1,955,478	340,522	(Note: Sweden. According to the Swedish National Police Agency in 2006, there were a total of 656,000 individuals who had a license for one or more guns, making up 6.5% of the population. There were 2,032,000 guns in total, or 21 guns per 100 residents. Of the 2,032,000 guns, 959,000 were rifles, 726,000 shotguns, 122,000 combination rifles, 88,000 pistols, 55,000 revolvers, 3,000 automatic guns and 78,000 weapons parts.)
Greenland	22.3	Americas	North America	56,000	13,000	3	N/A	N/A	
Pakistan	22.3	Asia	South Asia	196,744,000	43,917,000	2	6,000,000	37,917,000	
Portugal	21.3	Europe	Southern Europe	10,265,000	2,186,000	1	1,400,000	786,000	
France	19.6	Europe	Western Europe	64,939,000	12,732,000	1	4,501,235	8,230,765	
French Guiana	19.6	Americas	South America	283,000	55,000	3	N/A	N/A	
Germany	19.6	Europe	Western Europe	80,636,000	15,822,000	1	5,830,000	9,992,000	(Note: Germany. The number of legal guns in Germany is about 7 per 100 residents. There are no reliable figures on the number of illegal guns in Germany. The figure of 20 million illicit guns (≈24 per 100 residents) that is often cited on the web is an estimate attributed to the GdP, Germany's largest police union. This number differs from the UN Office on Drugs and Crime's estimate on illicit guns (10% of the number of legal guns, corresponding to 0.5 million illicit guns or ≈0.7 per 100 residents).)
Iraq	19.6	Asia	Western Asia	38,654,000	7,588,000	2	N/A	N/A	
Monaco	19.6	Europe	Western Europe	38,000	7,000	3	N/A	N/A	
Réunion	19.6	Africa	East Africa	873,000	171,000	3	N/A	N/A	
Luxembourg	18.9	Europe	Western Europe	584,000	110,000	1	86,000	24,000	
Bahamas	18.8	Americas	Caribbean	397,000	74,000	2	17,110	56,890	
Jordan	18.7	Asia	Western Asia	7,877,000	1,473,000	2	120,000	1,353,000	
Venezuela	18.5	Americas	South America	31,926,000	5,895,000	2	N/A	N/A	(Note: Venezuela. The number displayed in this table is very likely a significant underestimation. According to one estimate, 9 to 15 million illegal firearms were held by civilians in 2007.)
Greece	17.6	Europe	Southern Europe	10,893,000	1,920,000	1	1,010,000	910,000	
Northern Cyprus	17.4	Europe	Southern Europe	349,000	61,000	2	49,142	11,858	
Kuwait	16.7	Asia	Western Asia	4,100,000	685,000	3	39,000	646,000	
Oman	16.7	Asia	Western Asia	5,312,100	792,000	3	N/A	N/A	
Paraguay	16.7	Americas	South America	6,812,000	1,140,000	2	392,000	748,000	
Qatar	16.7	Asia	Western Asia	2,338,000	390,000	3	N/A	N/A	
Saudi Arabia	16.7	Asia	Western Asia	32,743,000	5,468,000	3	N/A	N/A	
United Arab Emirates	16.7	Asia	Western Asia	9,398,000	1,569,000	3	N/A	N/A	
U.S. Virgin Islands	16.6	Americas	Caribbean	107,000	18,000	2	N/A	N/A	
Turkey	16.5	Europe	Southern Europe	80,418,000	13,249,000	2	2,500,000	10,749,000	
Suriname	15.9	Americas	South America	552,000	88,000	2	30,000	58,000	
Guyana	15.8	Americas	South America	774,000	122,000	2	4,000	118,000	
Slovenia	15.6	Europe	Southern Europe	2,071,000	324,000	1	127,094	196,906	
Namibia	15.4	Africa	Southern Africa	2,569,000	396,000	2	200,010	195,990	
Thailand	15.1	Asia	South-East Asia	68,298,000	10,342,000	2	6,221,180	4,120,820	
Australia	14.5	Oceania	Australasia	24,642,000	3,573,000	2	3,158,795	414,205	
Italy	14.4	Europe	Southern Europe	59,798,000	8,609,000	1	2,000,000	6,609,000	
San Marino	14.4	Europe	Southern Europe	32,000	5,000	3	N/A	N/A	
Andorra	14.1	Europe	Southern Europe	69,000	10,000	3	7,599	2,401	
Honduras	14.1	Americas	Central America	8,305,000	1,171,000	2	475,000	696,000	
Channel Islands	14.0	Europe	Western Europe	165,000	23,000	2	14,550	8,450	
Croatia	13.7	Europe	Southern Europe	3,899,000	576,000	2	390,000	186,000	
Lithuania	13.6	Europe	Northern Europe	2,831,000	385,000	2	127,984	257,016	
Libya	13.3	Africa	North Africa	6,409,000	851,000	2	N/A	N/A	
Mexico	12.9	Americas	Central America	130,223,000	16,809,000	2	3,118,592	13,690,408	
Bahrain	12.8	Asia	Western Asia	1,419,000	181,000	3	N/A	N/A	
Belgium	12.7	Europe	Western Europe	11,444,000	1,451,000	1	426,939	1,024,061	
Afghanistan	12.5	Asia	South Asia	34,169,000	4,270,000	2	N/A	N/A	
Equatorial Guinea	12.5	Africa	Central Africa	894,000	112,000	2	N/A	N/A	
Somalia (South Central)	12.4	Africa	East Africa	7,282,000	903,000	2	N/A	N/A	
Puntland	12.3	Africa	East Africa	2,750,000	338,250	2	N/A	N/A	
Russia	12.3	Europe	Eastern Europe	143,375,000	17,620,000	2	6,600,000	11,020,000	
Chile	12.1	Americas	South America	18,313,000	2,220,000	2	763,182	1,456,818	
Guatemala	12.1	Americas	Central America	17,005,000	2,062,000	2	520,792	1,541,208	
Albania	12.0	Europe	Southern Europe	2,911,000	350,000	2	65,747	284,253	
El Salvador	12.0	Americas	Central America	6,167,000	737,000	2	344,587	392,413	
Somaliland	11.9	Africa	East Africa	3,823,000	456,000	2	N/A	N/A	
Guam	11.5	Oceania	Melanesia	174,000	20,000	3	N/A	N/A	
Puerto Rico	11.5	Americas	Caribbean	3,679,000	422,000	2	N/A	N/A	
Angola	11.2	Africa	Central Africa	26,656,000	2,982,000	2	N/A	N/A	
Northern Ireland	11.0	Europe	Western Europe	1,873,000	206,000	1	153,000	53,000	
Panama	10.8	Americas	Central America	4,051,000	436,000	2	180,000	256,000	
Hungary	10.5	Europe	Eastern Europe	9,788,000	1,023,000	1	211,300	811,700	
Latvia	10.5	Europe	Northern Europe	1,945,000	205,000	2	70,000	135,000	
Colombia	10.1	Americas	South America	49,068,000	4,971,000	2	706,210	4,264,790	
Georgia	10.1	Asia	Western Asia	3,973,000	402,000	2	159,000	243,000	
Samoa	10.1	Oceania	Polynesia	196,000	20,000	2	4,000	16,000	
Belize	10.0	Americas	Central America	375,000	37,000	2	10,755	26,245	
Costa Rica	10.0	Americas	Central America	4,906,000	493,000	2	235,631	257,369	
Denmark	9.9	Europe	Northern Europe	5,712,000	567,000	1	340,000	227,000	
Faroe Islands	9.9	Europe	Northern Europe	49,000	5,000	3	N/A	N/A	
Ukraine	9.9	Europe	Eastern Europe	44,405,000	4,396,000	2	800,000	3,596,000	
South Africa	9.7	Africa	Southern Africa	55,436,000	5,351,000	2	3,000,000	2,351,000	
South Sudan	9.6	Africa	East Africa	13,096,000	1,255,000	2	N/A	N/A	
Cayman Islands	9.2	Americas	Caribbean	62,000	6,000	3	1,556	4,444	
Jamaica	8.8	Americas	Caribbean	2,813,000	246,000	2	45,915	200,085	
Guadeloupe	8.5	Americas	Caribbean	472,000	40,000	2	5,500	34,500	
Martinique	8.5	Americas	Caribbean	396,000	34,000	3	N/A	N/A	
Saint Martin	8.5	Americas	Caribbean	32,000	3,000	3	N/A	N/A	
Bulgaria	8.4	Europe	Eastern Europe	7,045,000	590,000	1	345,733	244,267	
Brazil	8.3	Americas	South America	211,243,000	17,510,000	2	8,080,295	9,429,705	
Mauritius	8.3	Africa	East Africa	1,281,000	106,000	2	N/A	N/A	
Syria	8.2	Asia	Western Asia	18,907,000	1,547,000	2	N/A	N/A	
Ghana	8.0	Africa	West Africa	28,657,000	2,280,000	2	1,236,128	1,043,872	
Tonga	8.0	Oceania	Polynesia	108,000	9,000	2	N/A	N/A	
Mongolia	7.9	Asia	East Asia	3,052,000	242,000	3	46,982	195,018	
Spain	7.5	Europe	Southern Europe	46,070,000	3,464,000	1	2,683,542	780,458	
Argentina	7.4	Americas	South America	44,272,000	3,256,000	2	1,562,332	1,693,668	
Dominican Republic	7.4	Americas	Caribbean	10,767,000	795,000	2	333,426	461,574	
Iran	7.3	Asia	South Asia	80,946,000	5,890,000	2	N/A	N/A	
Ireland	7.2	Europe	Western Europe	4,749,000	342,000	2	200,000	142,000	
Israel	6.7	Asia	Western Asia	8,323,000	557,000	2	290,000	267,000	
Sudan	6.6	Africa	North Africa	42,166,000	2,768,000	2	6,724	2,761,276	
Gambia	6.5	Africa	West Africa	2,120,000	137,000	2	N/A	N/A	
Slovakia	6.5	Europe	Central Europe	5,432,000	355,000	2	280,000	75,000	
Dominica	6.2	Americas	Caribbean	73,000	5,000	3	N/A	N/A	
Maldives	6.2	Asia	South Asia	376,000	23,000	2	N/A	N/A	
Armenia	6.1	Asia	Western Asia	3,032,000	186,000	3	45,822	140,178	
Belarus	6.1	Europe	Eastern Europe	9,459,000	581,000	3	130,000	451,000	
Cape Verde	5.7	Africa	West Africa	533,000	31,000	2	N/A	N/A	
Scotland	5.6	Europe	Western Europe	5,436,000	305,000	1	187,000	118,000	
Antigua and Barbuda	5.4	Americas	Caribbean	94,000	5,000	2	1,449	3,551	
Montserrat	5.4	Americas	Caribbean	5,000	300	3	N/A	N/A	
India	5.3	Asia	South Asia	1,342,513,000	71,101,000	2	9,700,000	61,401,000	
Nicaragua	5.2	Americas	Central America	6,218,000	323,000	2	142,260	180,740	
Estonia	5.0	Europe	Northern Europe	1,306,000	65,000	1	47,000	18,000	
Lesotho	4.8	Africa	Southern Africa	2,185,000	105,000	3	N/A	N/A	
Morocco	4.8	Africa	North Africa	35,241,000	1,690,000	2	N/A	N/A	
Eswatini	4.8	Africa	Southern Africa	1,320,000	64,000	3	10,000	54,000	
Bermuda	4.6	Americas	North America	61,000	3,000	3	N/A	N/A	
England & Wales	4.6	Europe	Western Europe	58,877,000	2,731,000	1	1,870,735	860,265	
Grenada	4.6	Americas	Caribbean	108,000	5,000	3	N/A	N/A	
Cambodia	4.5	Asia	South-East Asia	16,076,000	717,000	2	N/A	N/A	
Mozambique	4.5	Africa	East Africa	29,538,000	1,337,000	2	7,000	1,330,000	
Ivory Coast	4.4	Africa	West Africa	23,816,000	1,049,000	3	2,500	1,046,500	
Sint Maarten	4.2	Americas	Caribbean	40,000	2,000	3	N/A	N/A	
Botswana	4.1	Africa	Southern Africa	2,344,000	97,000	2	32,901	64,099	
Egypt	4.1	Africa	North Africa	95,215,000	3,931,000	2	250,000	3,681,000	
Gibraltar	4.1	Europe	Southern Europe	32,000	1,000	1	N/A	N/A	
Seychelles	4.1	Africa	East Africa	98,000	4,000	2	N/A	N/A	
Vanuatu	3.9	Oceania	Melanesia	276,000	11,000	2	4,700	6,300	
Azerbaijan	3.6	Asia	Western Asia	9,974,000	362,000	2	N/A	N/A	
China	3.6	Asia	East Asia	1,388,233,000	49,735,000	2	680,000	49,055,000	
Macau	3.6	Asia	East Asia	606,000	22,000	3	N/A	N/A	
Hong Kong	3.6	Asia	East Asia	7,402,000	265,000	3	N/A	N/A	
Philippines	3.6	Asia	South-East Asia	103,797,000	3,776,000	2	1,739,000	2,037,000	
Barbados	3.5	Americas	Caribbean	286,000	10,000	3	3,000	7,000	
Gabon	3.4	Africa	Central Africa	1,801,000	61,000	2	N/A	N/A	
Saint Kitts and Nevis	3.4	Americas	Caribbean	57,000	2,000	3	N/A	N/A	
Saint Lucia	3.4	Americas	Caribbean	188,000	6,000	3	N/A	N/A	
Saint Vincent and the Grenadines	3.4	Americas	Caribbean	110,000	4,000	3	2,865	1,135	
São Tomé and Príncipe	3.4	Africa	Central Africa	198,000	7,000	3	N/A	N/A	
Turks and Caicos Islands	3.3	Americas	Caribbean	35,000	1,000	2	300	700	
Nigeria	3.2	Africa	West Africa	191,836,000	6,154,000	2	N/A	N/A	
Trinidad and Tobago	3.2	Americas	Caribbean	1,369,000	43,000	2	10,550	32,450	
Djibouti	3.1	Africa	East Africa	911,000	28,000	2	N/A	N/A	
Laos	3.0	Asia	South-East Asia	7,038,000	215,000	3	N/A	N/A	
Moldova	3.0	Europe	Eastern Europe	4,055,000	121,000	2	54,663	66,337	
Kazakhstan	2.8	Asia	Central Asia	18,064,000	504,000	2	284,000	220,000	
Kyrgyzstan	2.8	Asia	Central Asia	6,125,000	171,000	3	29,237	141,763	
Mauritania	2.8	Africa	West Africa	4,266,000	120,000	2	N/A	N/A	
Zimbabwe	2.8	Africa	East Africa	16,338,000	455,000	2	190,685	264,315	
Aruba	2.6	Americas	Caribbean	105,000	3,000	3	N/A	N/A	
Curaçao	2.6	Americas	Caribbean	160,000	4,000	3	N/A	N/A	
Haiti	2.6	Americas	Caribbean	10,983,000	291,000	2	20,379	270,621	
Netherlands	2.6	Europe	Western Europe	17,033,000	442,000	1	205,347	236,653	
Northern Mariana Islands	2.6	Oceania	Micronesia	56,000	1,000	2	N/A	N/A	
Romania	2.6	Europe	Eastern Europe	19,238,000	506,000	2	210,000	296,000	
French Polynesia	2.5	Oceania	Polynesia	289,000	7,000	2	N/A	N/A	
Poland	2.5	Europe	Central Europe	38,564,000	968,000	1	380,000	588,000	(Note: Poland.The number of registered firearms in this survey was taken from official data for the year 2014, even if data for the year 2016 (425k) should have been already available. As of 2024 there were 930k registered firearms.)
Congo	2.4	Africa	Central Africa	4,866,000	119,000	2	N/A	N/A	
Ecuador	2.4	Americas	South America	16,626,000	402,000	2	167,102	234,898	
Sri Lanka	2.4	Asia	South Asia	20,905,000	494,000	2	35,000	459,000	
Algeria	2.1	Africa	North Africa	41,064,000	877,000	2	200,000	677,000	
Cameroon	2.1	Africa	Central Africa	24,514,000	510,000	2	N/A	N/A	
Cuba	2.1	Americas	Caribbean	11,390,000	234,000	2	58,150	175,850	
Liberia	2.1	Africa	West Africa	4,730,000	97,000	2	N/A	N/A	
Bolivia	2.0	Americas	South America	11,053,000	218,000	3	10,982	207,018	
Burundi	2.0	Africa	East Africa	11,936,000	238,000	2	N/A	N/A	
Peru	2.0	Americas	South America	32,166,000	633,000	2	365,845	267,155	
Senegal	2.0	Africa	West Africa	16,054,000	323,000	2	7,053	315,947	
Central African Republic	1.8	Africa	Central Africa	5,099,000	94,000	2	N/A	N/A	
Myanmar	1.6	Asia	South-East Asia	54,836,000	877,000	3	N/A	N/A	
Vietnam	1.6	Asia	South-East Asia	95,415,000	1,562,000	2	N/A	N/A	
Comoros	1.5	Africa	East Africa	826,000	12,000	2	N/A	N/A	
Guinea-Bissau	1.5	Africa	West Africa	1,933,000	29,000	2	N/A	N/A	
Kenya	1.5	Africa	East Africa	48,467,000	750,000	2	8,136	741,864	
Nepal	1.5	Asia	South Asia	29,187,000	444,000	2	34,315	409,685	
Brunei	1.4	Asia	South-East Asia	434,000	6,000	2	N/A	N/A	
DR Congo	1.2	Africa	Central Africa	82,243,000	946,000	2	216	945,784	
Tuvalu	1.2	Oceania	Polynesia	10,000	100	2	50	50	
Mali	1.1	Africa	West Africa	18,690,000	206,000	2	N/A	N/A	
Palestine	1.1	Asia	Western Asia	4,952,000	56,000	2	N/A	N/A	
Tunisia	1.1	Africa	North Africa	11,495,000	123,000	3	3,408	119,592	
Chad	1.0	Africa	Central Africa	14,965,000	151,000	2	N/A	N/A	
Guinea	1.0	Africa	West Africa	13,291,000	130,000	2	N/A	N/A	
Papua New Guinea	1.0	Oceania	Melanesia	7,934,000	79,000	2	27,043	51,957	
Burkina Faso	0.9	Africa	West Africa	19,173,000	175,000	2	N/A	N/A	
Zambia	0.9	Africa	East Africa	17,238,000	158,000	2	86,642	71,358	
Bhutan	0.8	Asia	South Asia	793,000	6,000	3	4,309	1,691	
Kiribati	0.8	Oceania	Melanesia	116,000	900	2	N/A	N/A	
Tanzania	0.8	Africa	East Africa	56,878,000	427,000	2	115,850	311,150	
Togo	0.8	Africa	West Africa	7,692,000	58,000	2	10,000	48,000	
Uganda	0.8	Africa	East Africa	41,653,000	331,000	2	21,156	309,844	
British Virgin Islands	0.8	Americas	Caribbean	31,000	300	2	48	252	
American Samoa	0.7	Oceania	Polynesia	56,000	400	2	250	150	
Madagascar	0.7	Africa	East Africa	25,613,000	168,000	2	N/A	N/A	
Malaysia	0.7	Asia	South-East Asia	31,164,000	217,000	2	142,038	74,962	
Federated States of Micronesia	0.7	Oceania	Micronesia	106,000	700	2	N/A	N/A	
Fiji	0.5	Oceania	Melanesia	903,000	5,000	2	1,538	3,462	
Marshall Islands	0.5	Oceania	Melanesia	53,000	300	2	N/A	N/A	
Niger	0.5	Africa	West Africa	21,564,000	117,000	2	2,000	115,000	
Palau	0.5	Oceania	Melanesia	22,000	100	2	N/A	N/A	
Rwanda	0.5	Africa	East Africa	12,160,000	66,000	2	N/A	N/A	
Sierra Leone	0.5	Africa	West Africa	6,733,000	35,000	2	N/A	N/A	
Bangladesh	0.4	Asia	South Asia	164,828,000	659,000	2	185,000	474,000	
Eritrea	0.4	Africa	East Africa	5,482,000	23,000	2	N/A	N/A	
Ethiopia	0.4	Africa	East Africa	104,345,000	377,000	2	N/A	N/A	
Tajikistan	0.4	Asia	Central Asia	8,858,000	37,000	2	9,863	27,137	
Turkmenistan	0.4	Asia	Central Asia	5,503,000	23,000	3	N/A	N/A	
Uzbekistan	0.4	Asia	Central Asia	30,691,000	127,000	3	N/A	N/A	
Benin	0.3	Africa	West Africa	11,459,000	33,000	2	N/A	N/A	
Japan	0.3	Asia	East Asia	126,045,000	377,000	2	175,221	201,779	
North Korea	0.3	Asia	East Asia	25,405,000	76,000	3	N/A	N/A	
Malawi	0.3	Africa	East Africa	18,299,000	47,000	2	12,500	34,500	
Singapore	0.3	Asia	South-East Asia	5,785,000	20,000	3	795	19,205	
Timor-Leste	0.3	Asia	South-East Asia	1,237,000	3,000	2	N/A	N/A	
South Korea	0.2	Asia	East Asia	50,705,000	79,000	2	39,530	39,470	
Solomon Islands	0.2	Oceania	Melanesia	606,000	1,000	2	N/A	N/A	
Taiwan	0.04	Asia	East Asia	23,405,000	10,000	2	5,000	5,000	
Indonesia	0.03	Asia	South-East Asia	263,510,000	82,000	2	41,102	40,898	
Nauru	0.0	Oceania	Melanesia	10,000	0	2	N/A	N/A	
Christmas Island	0.0	Asia	South-East Asia	2,000	0	2	N/A	N/A	
Holy See	0.0	Europe	Southern Europe	1,000	0	2	N/A	N/A	

=== Notes ===
Return to top of table.

== See also ==
- List of countries by firearm-related homicide rates
- List of countries by guns and homicide
- Percent of households with guns by country
