= List of fact-checking websites =

This list of fact-checking websites includes websites that provide fact-checking services about both political and non-political subjects.

== Criteria ==
Whether a fact-checking site is in a network like the International Fact Checking Network can help to establish the reliability of a fact-checking organization.

=== International Fact-Checking Network ===
The International Fact Checking Network (IFCN), launched in 2015 by the Poynter Institute, set a code of ethics for fact-checking organizations. The IFCN reviews fact-checkers for compliance with its code, issuing a certification to publishers who pass the audit. The certification lasts for one year, and fact-checkers must be re-examined annually to retain their certifications. IFCN lists 170 organizations as members as of July 2024. Facebook and Instagram have used the IFCN's certification to vet publishers for fact-checking contracts.

=== European Fact-Checking Standards Network ===
The European Fact-Checking Standards Network (EFCSN) was launched in 2023 following a European Commission project to write the European Code of Standards for independent fact-checking organisations. The EFCSN reviews fact-checkers for compliance with its code and issues a certification to publishers who pass the audit of two independent assessors. The certification lasts for two years, and fact-checkers must be re-examined at the end of their certification in order to retain it. EFCSN membership is open to organisations with a substantial and demonstrable focus on a country that is a member of the Council of Europe, Kosovo, Belarus, or Russia. The EFCSN has 61 members as of April 2025.

=== Duke Reporters' Lab ===
The Reporters' Lab at Duke University maintains a database of fact-checking organizations that is managed by Mark Stencel and Bill Adair. As of 2024, the database has 439 non-partisan organizations around the world. The Lab's inclusion criteria are based on whether the organization:

- reviews statements by all parties and sides;
- examines discrete claims and reaches conclusions;
- transparently identifies its sources and explains its methods;
- discloses funding/affiliations;
- and whether its primary mission is news and information.

== Global ==
The Duke Reporter's lab found the number of reputable fact-checking sites around the world plateauing in 2024 around 440.

=== Websites operated by international media companies ===
- AFP fact checking (https://factcheck.afp.com/): operated by Agence France-Presse, an international media agency.
  - AFP fact checking is a signatory to the International Fact-Checking Network's codes of principles. AFP fact checking is indexed by Duke Reporter's Lab.
- Reuters Fact Check (https://www.reuters.com/fact-check/): operated by Reuters, an international media agency.
  - Reuters Fact Check is a signatory to the International Fact-Checking Network's codes of principles.

== By region ==
=== Africa ===
- Africa Check: Africa's first independent fact-checking organization with offices in Kenya, Nigeria, South Africa, Senegal and the UK checking claims made by public figures and the media in Africa.
  - Africa Check is a signatory to the International Fact-Checking Network's codes of principles. Africa Check is indexed by Duke Reporter's Lab.
- DUBAWA (also known as the Premium Times Center for Investigative Journalism; https://dubawa.org/category/fact-check/ ): a West African independent verification and fact-checking project, initiated by the Centre for Journalism Innovation and Development (CJID) (formerly the Premium Times Centre for Investigative Journalism [PTCIJ]) and supported by the most influential newsrooms and civic organisations in West Africa to help amplify the culture of truth in public discourse, public policy, and journalistic practice. It has a presence in Nigeria, Ghana, Sierra Leone, Liberia and The Gambia.
  - DUBAWA is a signatory to the International Fact-Checking Network's codes of principles. DUBAWA is indexed by Duke Reporter's Lab.
- Roundcheck (https://roundcheck.com.ng/): a youth-led fact-checking organization in Nigeria combating misinformation and disinformation and promoting media literacy. One of their objectives is integrating young people into fact-checking to help curb the spread of information disorder.
  - In 2022, the organisation began a bi-annual volunteering network aimed at training young fact-checkers in Africa and mentoring them to publish their contents for a period of four months after which they are inducted as team members.
  - In 2024, a gender disinformation desk was created to monitor and factcheck misinformation and disinformation around gender.
- News Verifier Africa (https://newsverifierafrica.com/): fact-checking and news verification platform for Africans. Established in 2020, the non-profit platform seeks to improve public access to accurate information by simplifying fact-checking and creating varied appealing formats for fact checked news, data and viral images.
- FactCheckHub (https://factcheckhub.com/): the verification platform of the International Centre for Investigative Reporting (ICIR) aimed at combating misinformation in the society. It is an independent, non-partisan platform for factchecking with the primary aim of combating misinformation, disinformation, hoaxes and rumours about topical issues. It has been mentioned in the context of election monitoring.
  - FactCheckHub is a signatory to the International Fact-checking Network's codes of principles. FactCheckHub is indexed by Duke Reporter's Lab.
- PesaCheck (https://pesacheck.org/): a fact-checking program established by Code for Africa in 2017 to verify public and financial statements of governments across 12 African countries using statistical data. Its fact-checks are available in English, French, Kiswahili, and Amharic. It also help non-profit organisations, universities, and media watch dogs set up their own fact-check groups.
  - Code for Africa is a signatory to the International Fact-checking Network's codes of principles. PesaCheck is indexed by Duke Reporter's Lab.
- Fact-Check Ghana (https://www.fact-checkghana.com/): a non-profit fact-checking project under the Media Foundation for West Africa (MFWA). The first fact-checking project in Ghana was set up in 2016 to promote fact-based public discourse, especially in the media landscape that has seen a significant increase in internet access.https://www.modernghana.com/news/1271184/2024-elections-we-will-fact-check-and-expose-fals.html#google_vignette Fact-Check Ghana is headquartered in Accra. Fact-Check Ghana is a signatory to the International Fact-checking Network's codes of principles.
- FactSpace West Africa (https://factspace.org/): an independent, non-partisan organisation working to tackle mis/disinformation and propaganda across West Africa. The organization leads fact-checking initiatives in Ghana (https://ghanafact.com/), The Gambia, Liberia, Sierra Leone and Nigeria. FactSpace is a signatory to the International Fact-Checking Network (IFCN) Code of Principles.

=== Asia-Pacific ===
==== Australia ====
- RMIT ABC Fact Check (https://www.abc.net.au/news/factcheck): launched in June 2016, was jointly funded by RMIT University and the Australian Broadcasting Corporation (ABC). It was associated with the RMIT FactLab (https://www.rmit.edu.au/about/schools-colleges/media-and-communication/industry/factlab). The RMIT ABC Fact Check was focused on political fact-checking. As of the 1st of July 2024 it has ceased operation and will be replaced with ABC News Verify.
  - Both RMIT ABC Fact Check and RMIT FactLab are a signatory to the International Fact-Checking Network's codes of principles. Both RMIT ABC Fact Check and RMIT FactLab are indexed by Duke Reporter's Lab.
- AAP FactCheck (https://www.aap.com.au/factcheck/): Part of non-profit national news agency Australian Associated Press (AAP); launched in 2019.
  - AAP is a signatory to the International Fact-Checking Network's codes of principles. AAP FactCheck is indexed by Duke Reporter's Lab.
- Hoax Slayer was a website dedicated to the topic of urban legends. Opened in 2003, it became defunct since 2021.

==== Bangladesh ====
- FactWatch (or Fact Watch, https://www.fact-watch.org/web/): an independent fact-checking entity affiliated to the University of Liberal Arts Bangladesh.
  - FactWatch is a signatory to the International Fact-Checking Network's codes of principles. FactWatch is indexed by Duke Reporter's Lab.
- Jachai (Formerly: Jaachai, https://www.jachai.org) is a Bangladesh-based fact-checking website that highlights the truth of various news and information circulating online and thereby encourages everyone to disseminate information responsibly.
- Rumor Scanner Bangladesh (or just Rumor Scanner): an independent fact-checking initiative.
  - Rumor Scanner is a signatory to the International Fact-Checking Network's codes of principles Rumor Scanner is indexed by Duke Reporter's Lab.
- Dismislab (Formerly: (https://en.dismislab.com/) is a Bangladesh-based fact-checking and media research platform that verifies the accuracy of news, images, videos, and claims circulating online, with the aim of promoting responsible information sharing.
- The Dissent is a Bangladeshi investigative outlet. It has a fact-checking section and was founded by Bangladesh editor of AFP's fact checking division.

==== China ====
Fact-checking websites in China often avoid commenting on political, economic, and other current affairs. Several Chinese fact-checking websites have been criticized for lack of transparency with regard to their methodology and sources, and for following Chinese propaganda. Operators of some fact-checking websites in China admit to self-censorship.

- AFP Hong Kong (https://factcheck.afp.com/afp-hong-kong): Fact-checking by the Hong Kong bureau of the Agence France-Presse news service.
  - AFP fact checking is a signatory to the International Fact-Checking Network's codes of principles. AFP fact checking is indexed by Duke Reporter's Lab.
- Annie Lab (https://annielab.org/): a project by the University of Hong Kong's Journalism & Media Studies Centre in collaboration with ANNIE (Asian Network of News and Information Educators)
  - Annie Lab is a signatory to the International Fact-Checking Network's codes of principles. Annie Lab is indexed by Duke Reporter's Lab.
- China Fact Check (https://chinafactcheck.com/): a project founded by Shanghai-based Chinese journalist Wei Xing.
  - While the outlet has been praised for its debunking of disinformation related to, among others, the Russian invasion of Ukraine, its founder has noted that self-censorship is required in cases where the "result goes against the government's stance."
- Chinese Internet Joint Rumor Refutation Platform (or just The Joint): a government platform run by the Cyberspace Administration of China
  - The website has been criticized for lack of transparency with regards to its methodology and sources, and following Chinese propaganda.
- Factcheck Lab (https://www.factchecklab.org/): a project by the nonprofit Culture and Media Education Foundation in Hong Kong.
  - Factcheck Lab is a signatory to the International Fact-Checking Network's codes of principles. Factcheck Lab is indexed by Duke Reporter's Lab.
- HKBU Fact Check (https://factcheck.hkbu.edu.hk/home/): a project by the School of Communication at Hong Kong Baptist University.
  - HKBU Fact Check is a signatory to the International Fact-Checking Network's codes of principles. HKBU Fact Check is indexed by Duke Reporter's Lab.
- Tencent News Jiao Zhen (or just Jiao Zhen, or Jiaozhen, https://new.qq.com/omn/author/5107513): official fact checking project by Chinese company Tencent.
  - Tencent News Jiao Zhen is indexed by Duke Reporter's Lab.
  - The website has been criticized for lack of transparency with regards to its methodology and sources, and following Chinese propaganda.

===== Hong Kong =====
- Factcheck Lab (https://reporterslab.org/fact-checking/): A project launched by the nonprofit Culture and Media Education Foundation in Hong Kong. Member of International Fact-Checking Network (IFCN). It is indexed by the Duke Reporter's Lab.
- HKBU Fact Check is a signatory to the International Fact-Checking Network's codes of principles. HKBU Fact Check is indexed by Duke Reporter's Lab.

==== India ====
International Fact-Checking Network verified signatories:

- DFRAC
- Telugpost.com
- BOOM
- The Quint
- Factcrescendo.com
- Youturn.in
- India Today Fact Check from TV Today Network Ltd. (Living Media India)
- Factly.in
- THIP Media from The Healthy Indian Project (THIP Healthtech Pvt Ltd)
- medicaldialogues.in:

Others:

- Alt News
- Vishvasnews.com from Jagran Prakashan
- Newsmobile.in
- Newschecker.in

==== Japan ====
- GoHoo: Launched by a nonprofit association Watchdog for Accuracy in News-reporting, Japan (WANJ or 一般社団法人 日本報道検証機構) on November 16, 2014. Crowd-funded approx. 1.6 million yen through Ready For. Awarded Social Business Grand Prize 2012 Summer.
- Japan Center of Education for Journalists (JCEJ): Fosters journalists and fact-checkers by referring to a Journalist's Guide to Social Sources published by First Draft News, a project of the Harvard Kennedy School's Shorenstein Center. JCEJ itself also debunks falsehoods.

==== Nepal ====
- Nepal Fact Check: initiated in March 2020 as an urgent response to COVID-19 misinformation by CMR-Nepal and Nepali-language blog, MySansar. It has been a signatory of the International Fact-Checking Network (IFCN) since 2023.

==== Pakistan ====
- Soch Fact Check

==== Philippines ====
- ABS-CBN Fact Check: A fact-checking arm of ABS-CBN News. It is a signatory to the International Fact-checking Network's codes of principles. It is indexed by the Duke Reporter's Lab.
- AFP Philippines Fact Check: the Philippine fact checking arm of Agence France-Presse. It is 1 of 3 fact checking organizations engaged by Meta Platforms.
- Fact-Check PH: An independent fact-checking initiative founded by Assortedge.
- FactRakers: A fact-checking of major journalism at University of the Philippines Diliman. It is indexed by the Duke Reporter's Lab.
- PressOne.PH: An independent news and information website that is basically a fact-checking tool against misinformation. It is a signatory to the International Fact-checking Network's codes of principles. It is indexed by the Duke Reporter's Lab.
- Rappler: An online news website that is used as a fact-checking tool. It is a signatory to the International Fact-checking Network's codes of principles since October 27, 2017. It is indexed by the Duke Reporter's Lab. It is 1 of 3 fact checking organizations engaged by Meta Platforms.
- Tsek.ph: A collaborate fact-checking such as political, media, and academic. It is indexed by the Duke Reporter's Lab.
- Vera Files: A non-profit online news organization known for institutionalized fact-checking of false information. It is a signatory to the International Fact-checking Network's codes of principles. It is indexed by the Duke Reporter's Lab. It is 1 of 3 fact-checking organizations engaged by Meta Platforms.

==== Sri Lanka ====
- Citizen Fact Check: the first fact-checking agency to be launched by a local media organization in Sri Lanka. It is run by the Citizen Media Network.
- FactCheck.lk
- Watchdog

==== South Korea ====
- SNU factcheck (http://factcheck.snu.ac.kr/): A service operated by Seoul National University's Media Information Research Institute. It is indexed by the Duke Reporter's Lab.
- Fact Check Net (https://www.factchecker.or.kr/): A service launched in 2020 by several South Korean media and journalism associations (Korea Broadcasting Journalist Association (KBJA), the Journalists Association of Korea, the Korean Producers and Directors Association, and Parti, a social cooperative It was suspended in 2023.

==== Taiwan ====
- Cofacts: an open source project associated with the G0v movement
- MyGoPen: a project run by Taiwanese civil society group. It is a signatory to the International Fact-checking Network's codes of principles. It is indexed by the Duke Reporter's Lab.
- Taiwan FactCheck Center A non-profit organization that seeks to verify rumors and disinformation in Taiwanese society in order to promote fact-based public discussion. In 2023 it has been described as "one of the most prominent news verification groups on the island". It is a signatory to the International Fact-checking Network's codes of principles. It is indexed by the Duke Reporter's Lab.

=== Europe ===
==== Austria ====
- Mimikama.org

==== Bulgaria ====
- Factcheck.bg: Bulgarian fact-checking website, a project by the Association of European Journalists-Bulgaria (AEJ-Bulgaria).
- AFP Провери: Bulgarian fact-checking website by Agence France-Presse (AFP) and the Bulgarian journalist Rosen Bosev. "AFP Провери" is a Facebook partner verifying the Bulgarian content on the social media.

==== Croatia ====
- Faktograf.hr: Croatian fact-checking website set up by the Croatian Journalists' Association and GONG.

==== Czech Republic ====
- Demagog.cz: Czech fact-checking website operated by a politically independent voluntary association, launched in 2016.

==== Denmark ====
- TjekDet.dk: Independent Danish online media outlet dedicated to fact-checking claims made in public discourse. Its primary aim is to help media users identify false information and online disinformation. Founded in 2016 by the media company Mandag Morgen, TjekDet has operated as a self-governing, non-profit organization since 2020. TjekDet verifies claims made by politicians, businesses, organizations, and other media outlets. The outlet also provides two publicly available knowledge banks: one aimed at educators and educational institutions with teaching materials on source criticism and media literacy, and another compiling research on misinformation and disinformation in the online public sphere.

==== Finland ====
- Faktabaari: Finnish awarded and politically independent fact-checking agency, launched in 2014.

==== France ====
- Les Décodeurs: French fact-checking blog run by Le Monde.
- Science Feedback, Climate Feedback, and Health Feedback: family of websites dedicated to fact-checking media coverage of science, climate change, and health, respectively.
- Agence France-Presse (AFP)： launched its digital verification service in France in 2017, which has since evolved into a leading global fact-checking agency with dedicated journalists in countries ranging from the United States to Myanmar.
- Captain Fact
- HoaxBuster

==== Germany ====
- Correctiv
- Deutsche Presse-Agentur
- Deutsche Welle. DW Fact Check in English was launched in 2020.
- Tagesschau
- Volksverpetzer: German fact checkers that research and expose fake news.

==== Georgia ====
- FactCheck Georgia: project of the Tbilisi-based think-tank Georgia's Reforms Associates (GRASS), launched in 2013.

==== Greece ====
- FactReview: Independent Greek fact-checking organization established in November 2022, covering a broad scope of topics including political and scientific misinformation, online scams, and foreign information manipulation and interference (FIMI). FactReview is a member of the International Fact-Checking Network (IFCN), the European Fact-Checking Standards Network (EFCSN), and the European Digital Media Observatory's (EDMO) fact-checking network. FactReview was the first fact-checking organization in Greece to be certified as a Trusted Flagger under the EU's Digital Services Act (October 2024).
- Ellinikahoaxes.gr: Greek fact-checking website launched in 2013. Debunks hoaxes, urban legends, fake news, internet scams and other stories of questionable origin.
- Greece Fact Check: independent Greek fact-checking website launched in February 2017 specializing in pseudoscience and medical frauds.
- Check4facts.gr is a Greek digital fact-checking platform that verifies the accuracy of public statements and news related to climate change, health, migration, and crime. Established in early 2021, it operates under the coordination of the National Centre for Social Research (EKKE) and collaborates with multiple public research and academic institutions. The platform employs a combination of investigative journalism and machine learning techniques to assess the credibility of information in the public sphere. By providing well-substantiated and cross-checked information, check4facts.gr aims to enrich public dialogue and encourage citizen participation in seeking reliable information on critical societal issues.

==== Italy ====
- Bufale.net: National public service for citizens against fake news
- Pagella Politica: Italian fact-checking website.
- Butac.it: Fact-checking website created in 2013
- Facta.news
- Cryterio: Live fact-checking of political broadcasts; AI-assisted real-time verification of factual claims against public sources, with citations, during live political streams. Created in 2026.

==== Latvia ====
- Re:Check at The Baltic Center for Investigative Journalism Re:Baltica.

==== Lithuania ====
- Demaskuok.lt and Debunk.org: launched by Delfi and other Lithuanian online media.

==== Netherlands ====
- Bellingcat, specialising in fact-checking and open-source intelligence (OSINT), founded in 2014 by British citizen journalist Eliot Higgins.

==== Norway ====
- Faktisk.no: fact-checking site focusing on public debate in Norway. Set up by rival Norwegian media outlets and a part of IFCN.

==== Poland ====
- Demagog: the first fact-checking website in Poland, dedicated to fact check political statements. Member of International Fact-Checking Network at Poynter Institute.
- Pravda.org.pl: Polish fact-checking association. Member of International Fact-Checking Network at Poynter Institute.
- FakeNews.pl: Member of International Fact-Checking Network at Poynter Institute.

==== Portugal ====
- Observador: newspaper with a fact-checking section called Fact Check. First Portuguese member of International Fact-Checking Network at Poynter Institute.
- Polígrafo: online fact-checking website. Also featured on a SIC news programme.

==== Romania ====
- Factual.ro: launched by the Funky Citizens organization.

==== Russia ====
- Provereno.Media

==== Serbia ====
- Istinomer – Member of the International Fact-Checking Network

==== Spain ====
- Comprobado (hosted by Maldita.es).
- Miniver.org: the first fact-checking web in Spain, launched in 2017, with the purpose of debunking fake news. Accredited by Google as fact-checking organization.
- Newtral: Spanish fact-checking organization founded by journalist Ana Pastor from LaSexta. Currently the official news verifier for Facebook Spain.
- Maldita.es: independent Spanish fact-checking organization.
- Verificat.cat: the first fact-checking platform in Catalonia, the only one with the recognition of the International Fact-Checking Network (Poynter Institute) and the European Disinformation Observatory.

==== Ukraine ====
- FactCheck Ukraine: launched by the Kyiv-based Ukrainian Team of Reformers in 2016.
- Gwara Media
- StopFake: launched by the Kyiv Mohyla Journalism School in 2014.
- VoxCheck: unveiled by VoxUkraine, an online economics and policy project, in 2015.

==== United Kingdom ====
- BBC Reality Check
- BBC Verify and BBC Verify Live
- Full Fact: independent fact-checking organization based in the UK which aims to "promote accuracy in public debate", launched in 2009.
- FactCheckNI: the first independent dedicated fact-checking service for Northern Ireland, launched in 2016, checking claims as well as offering training in critical thinking, tools and techniques any member of the public can use.
- The FactCheck blog: fact-checking blog run by the Channel 4 News organization in the UK.
- Ferret Fact Service: Scotland's first fact-checker launched in April 2017 after a grant from the Google Digital News Initiative.
- Logically

=== Latin America ===
==== Argentina ====
- Chequeado.com
- Reverso

==== Bolivia ====
- Bolivia Verifica
- Chequea Bolivia

==== Brazil ====
IFCN verified signatories:

- Agência Lupa
- Aosfatos.org
- UOL Confere

Others:

- Agência Pública - Truco no Congresso
- Boatos.org
- Projeto Comprova
- E-farsas
- É isso Mesmo? (from O Globo)
- Portal EBC's Hoax reports
- AletheiaFact.org

==== Chile ====
- ChileCheck
- Del dicho al hecho
- El Polígrafo (from El Mercurio)
- Observatorio de Datos Universidad Adolfo Ibáñez

==== Colombia ====
- Colombia Check
- Detector de Mentiras

==== Costa Rica ====
- Doble Chek (from Universidad de Costa Rica)

==== Guatemala ====
- Con Pruebas

==== Mexico ====
- Checa Datos
- El Sabueso
- Verificado

==== Peru ====
- Ama Llulla
- OjoBiónico

==== Uruguay ====
- UYcheck

==== Venezuela ====
- Cotejo
- Efecto Cocuyo
- Verifikado

=== Middle East ===
==== Iran ====
- Gomaneh: online Persian magazine devoted to the investigation of rumors and hearsay.
- Factnameh: online Persian magazine launched in 2017 by the ASL19 organization.

==== Israel ====
- Bodkim
- FakeReporter

==== Jordan ====
- Akeed
- Arab Reporters for Investigative Journalism (ARIJ)
- Fatabyyano
- Misbar

==== Lebanon ====
- Sawab

==== Palestine ====
- Kashif
- Tahaqaq

==== Saudi Arabia ====
- Anti-Rumors Authority

==== Turkey ====
- Teyit: independent fact-checking organization based in Turkey and a signatory to the International Fact-Checking Network's Code of Principles and is one of the partners of First Draft News.
- Doğruluk Payı: independent fact-checking organization that focuses on verifying the factual accuracy of statements by Turkish politicians.
- Malumat Furuş: independent organization fact-checking articles published on printed and online media

=== North America ===
==== Canada ====
- FactsCan
- Décrypteurs: focuses on the spread of false information on social media.
- Rumor Detector by Agence Science-Presse

==== United States ====
- AFP Fact Check from Agence France-Presse: originally launched in France in 2017, now global and available in multiple languages. ICFN signatory. Facebook partner.
- Check Your Fact, IFCN signatory and Facebook partner owned by The Daily Caller but editorially independent.
- FactCheck.org and FactCheckEd.org: self-described "advocates for voters that aims to reduce the level of deception and confusion in U.S. politics", and serving as an educational resource for high school teachers and students, respectively (the latter founded 2005). They are projects of the Annenberg Public Policy Center of the Annenberg School for Communication at the University of Pennsylvania, and are funded primarily by the Annenberg Foundation.
- Fact Checker (The Washington Post): project of The Washington Post, known for grading politicians on the factual accuracy of their statements with zero to four "Pinocchios". Created September 2007 by Post diplomatic writer Michael Dobbs specifically for the 2008 presidential election. Ceased operation November 4, 2008, but relaunched with a broader focus in January 2011, led by veteran Post diplomatic correspondent Glenn Kessler.
- Lead Stories: fact checks posts that Facebook flags but also use its own technology, called "Trendolizer", to detect trending hoaxes from hundreds of known fake news sites, satirical websites and prank generators.
- Media Bias/Fact Check. An American website with focus on "political bias" and "factual reporting".
- Metabunk: A discussion forum setup by Mick West that covers such topics as pseudoscience, UFOs and the paranormal. The website also includes a forum, "Skydentify", where West invites people to send photos and videos of UFOs and supposed ghosts.
- NPR Fact Check. Operated by American NPR nonprofit media organization. Has a focus on current news events.
- PolitiFact: service of the Tampa Bay Times created in August 2007, uses the "Truth-o-Meter" to rank the amount of truth in public persons' statements. 2009 Pulitzer Prize Winner.
- Snopes: focuses on, but is not limited to, validating and debunking urban legends and other stories in American popular culture.
- RealClearPolitics's Fact Check Review: aspires to offer quaternary-level critiquing of such tertiary-level efforts at fact-checking as those listed above. Within its inaugural review item on April 9, 2018, RCP writer Kalev Leetaru said its efforts at "checking the fact checkers" were to "explore how the flagship fact-checking organizations operate in practice (as opposed to their self-reported descriptions), from their claim and verification sourcing to their topical focus to just what constitutes a 'fact.'" Leetaru is a Georgetown University fellow in residence, holding the chair established there for study and promotion of "international values, communications technology and the global Internet".
- Retrocodex: An evolving archive of commonly taught myths, misconceptions, and outdated facts similar to Wikipedia's List of common misconceptions. It occasionally includes topics pertaining to contemporary media misinformation.
- VietFactCheck: A volunteer-led program seeking to offer Vietnamese Americans with fact-checked, contextualized, source-verified analysis in English and Vietnamese.

== Fraudulent fact-checking websites ==
- Fact Check Armenia: a website with ties to Turkish government-related organizations that denies the historical facts of the Armenian genocide.
- Fact Checking Turkey: operated by PR company Bosphorus Global and counters criticism of Turkey in foreign media. It treats statements by Turkish government officials as arbiters of the truth.
- Mediekollen: A Swedish far-right Facebook group. It was pulled from Facebook after The Guardian reported on it in January 2017.
- War on Fakes: a Russian website that promotes Russian propaganda and disinformation about the Russian invasion of Ukraine.
- Fact-check.am: an Armenian website, launched in October 2024, presents itself as a fact-checking site, but in reality its publications systematically target civil society actors funded by international aid, notably by the Open Society Foundations, and discredit civil rights organisations accused of weakening Armenia, without being transparent about its owners and editorial team.
- Faktum: a Hungarian website launched by the pro-government Foundation for Transparent Journalism that promotes government's official narratives. Faktum justified Hungary's withdrawal from the International Criminal Court by claiming the ICC exercising "selective justice".
- Global Fact-Checking Network (GFCN): a Russian organisation launched in November 2024 with an active website since April 2025 that claims to "coordinate efforts to combat misinformation by participants from different countries at the global level," but in reality promotes Russian propaganda and disinformation.
