= Verificado 2018 =

Mexican collaborative journalism initiative

Verificado 2018 was a three-month collaborative journalism initiative to detect and counter false claims and disinformation related to Mexico's 2018 federal election. It involved over 90 partner organizations from across Mexico including local and national media outlets, universities, and civil society and advocacy groups. For much of the time, work was coordinated through a digital newsroom by a core group of about 30 people. Larger groups fact-checked presidential debates. On the weekend of the election, which was held July 1, 2018, members worked in person in a physical newsroom.

Citizen participation was a key element of Verificado's work. Fact-checking was framed as "a shared responsibility among media, governments, and citizens". Verificado had more than 330,000 followers on Facebook and Twitter, and worked closely with WhatsApp, a social media app highly popular in Mexico. Verificado created a WhatsApp hotline where users could submit messages for verification and debunking. Over 10,000 WhatsApp users subscribed to the Verificado hotline. During the course of the election, Verificado 2018 published over 400 notes and 50 videos documenting false claims, suspect sites, and instances where fake news went viral. In its public discourse, Verificado focused on establishing its legitimacy, being collaborative, and using humor in ways that were both critical and friendly. Millions of people visited sites around Verificado content.

Verificado 2018 won the Excellence in Collaboration and Partnerships award at the 2018 Online Journalism Awards. It also won a World Digital Media Award for Best Innovation to Engage Young Audiences in 2019.

== Organization ==
External audio
- "Verificado 2018: Global Lessons Learned from Debunking Fake News in Mexican Elections", Online News Association

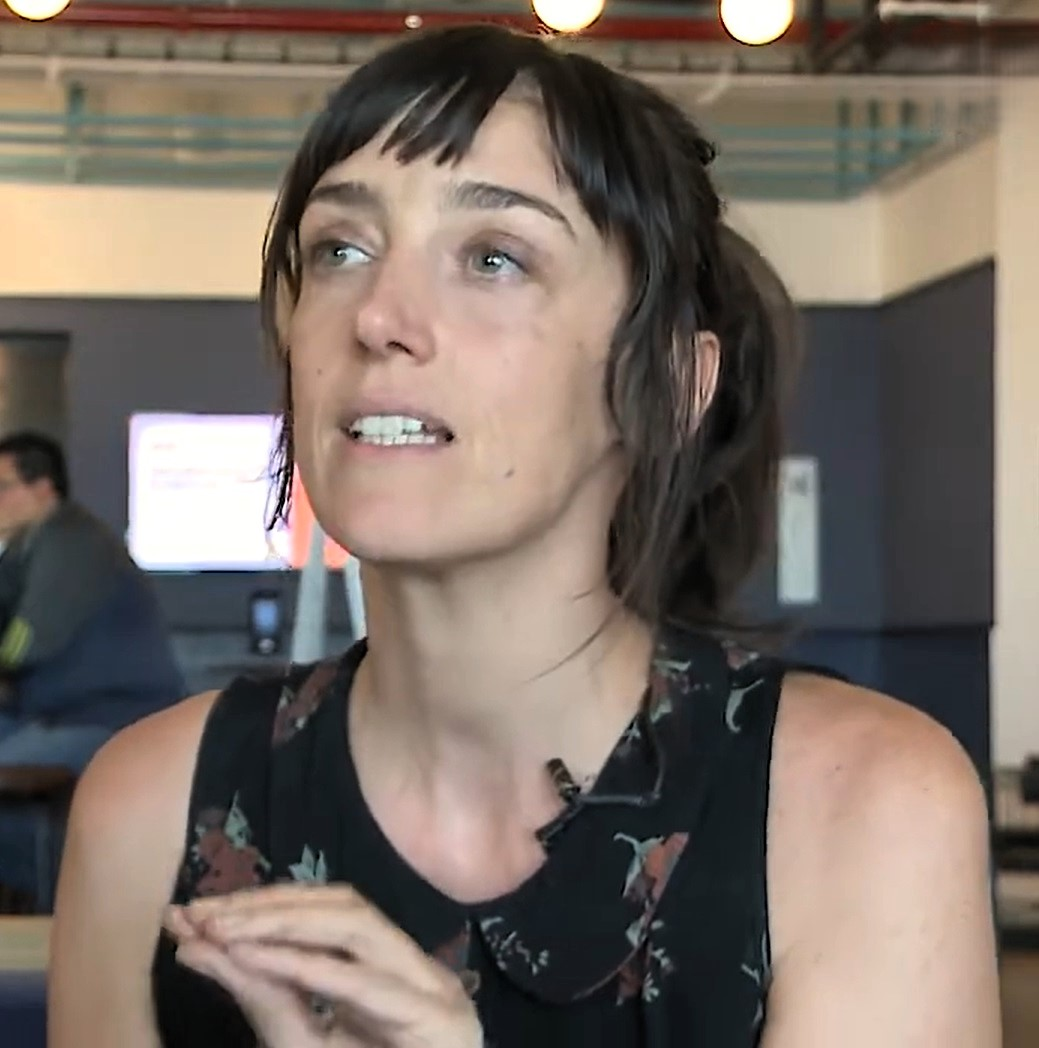
Alba Moro, executive producer of AJ+ Español, discusses Verificado 2018 with NotimexTV

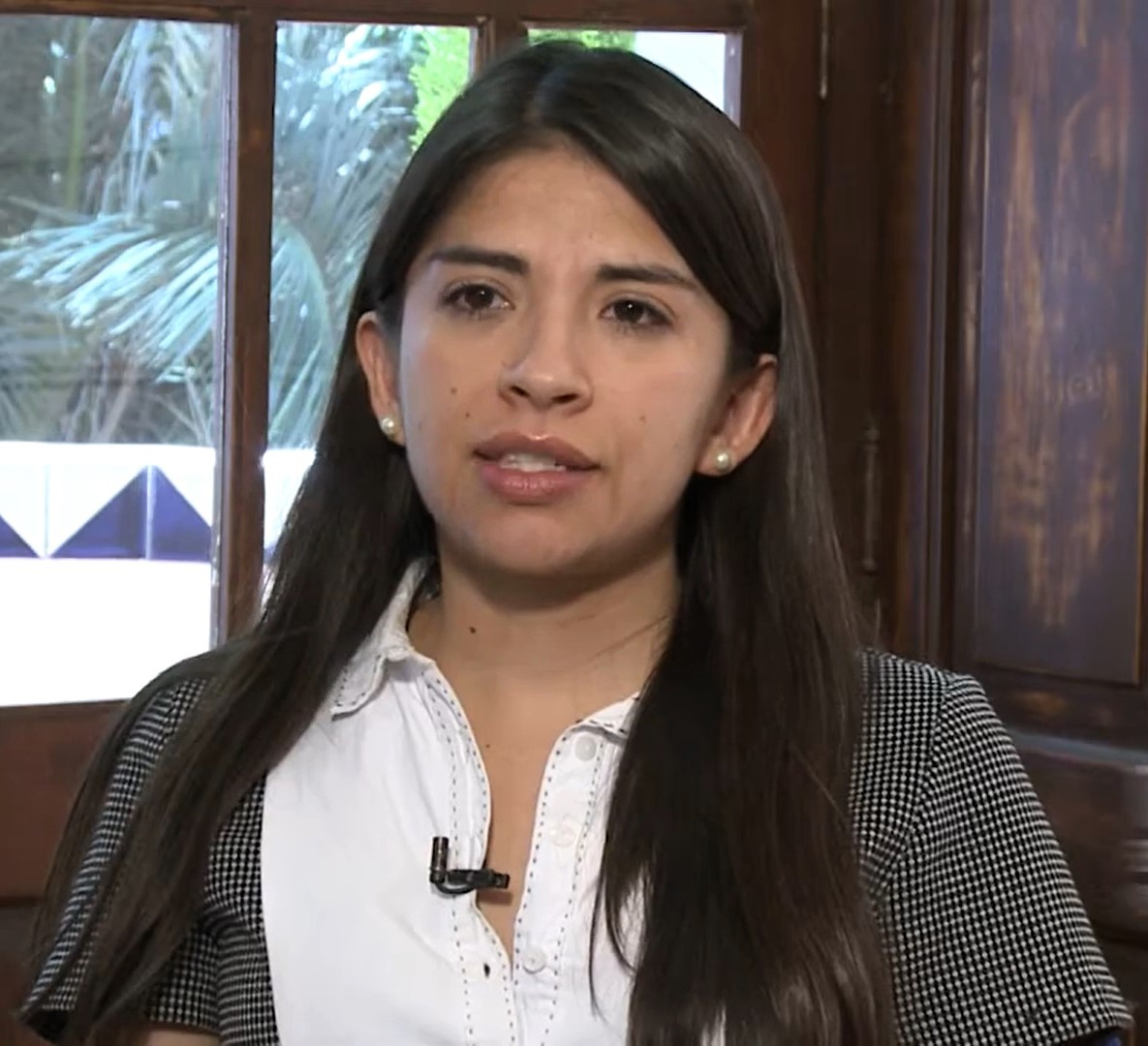
Tania Montalvo, chief editor of Animal Político, discusses Verificado 2018 with NotimexTV

The pop-up newsroom approach is intended to create a temporary newsroom around a specific event, such as an election or natural disaster. It can be used for global or local initiatives. For the Verificado 2018 project, organizers from Pop-Up Newsroom, AJ+ Español, and Animal Político worked with organizations from 28 of 32 Mexican states. A Verificado launch workshop was held on March 12, 2018, and attended by more than 100 journalists from across Mexico, not just Mexico City. They worked with Pop-Up Newsroom to design workflows for collaborative verification and content production that would be specific to the community partners and event involved, Mexico's general election.

Verificado 2018 received initial support from the Facebook Journalism Project and Google News Initiative. They drew on previous initiatives for collaborative fact-checking and reporting such as Electionland in the 2016 U.S. presidential election and CrossCheck in the 2017 French presidential election. They were also influenced by Verificado19S, a citizen-led collaboration of about 250 volunteers who successfully fact-checked information around a 7.1 magnitude earthquake that struck Mexico City and Puebla City on September 19, 2017.

At the core of Verificado 2018, there was a team of 30 journalists who collaborated through a digital newsroom. One report indicates that the ratio of coordinators to fact-checkers was around 1:5. Between March and July 2018, they identified and fact-checked information that was reported to them, and collaboratively created and released educational and debunking content. Verificado intentionally created strong visuals that were easy to read, searchable and shareable, and used social media techniques to address disinformation where it was happening. To fact-check election debates, larger groups were formed. During the election weekend, the journalists worked together in a physical space.

The Verificado 2018 team used communication tools like Slack and collaborative verification tools like Check by Meedan. Check functioned as a central project database, providing team members with a collaborative workflow for curating, annotating and verifying content. Content was selected for verification based on the likelihood that it could be checked and its level of public interest. Check was used to track the assignment of staff to different steps and prevent duplication of effort. Senior editors assigned a final status such as True (Verdadero), False (Falso) or Misleading (Engañoso) to each claim. Other tools included CrowdTangle, Tweetdeck, and Krzana. The workflow's verification paths and use of tools were matched to the types of content involved. Different steps would be involved, for example, in verifying a video and a WhatsApp chain.

Verificado's ninety partners included television, national and local newspapers, radio, civil society and advocacy groups and academics from across Mexico. The role taken by the organizations varied. For example, a small local newsroom such as Monitor Expresso was engaged in local fact-checking and reporting. A large broadcaster such as Televisa focused on publishing Verificado's content to its wide audience. By working with academics and subject matter experts as well as traditional journalists, Verificado 2018 was able to bring insight and expertise to a wide range of issues and to respond quickly.

In a culture where both news media and government were distrusted as partisan and corrupt, where there were high levels of election-related violence, and where disinformation was widely used to confuse and sway readers, Verificado 2018 was transparent about its organizational structure, its funding, and its reporting methodology. Verificado legitimized itself as a source of information through its disclosure of information, its association with trustworthy partners, and its interaction with users who became active participants rather than passive recipients of information. Its processes for validating claims were clearly and publicly outlined in a decision tree for investigating fact-checking. Notes made during the verification process were publicly available. Verificado 2018 also clearly defined and controlled its branding and how it could be used, to ensure that people could identify authorized sources and know whom to trust.

Verificado 2018 pointed out practices such as "declaracionitis", the publication of statements by public figures without analysis, considering that this way of proceeding implies forgetting a basic element in journalism: corroborating the information that is published.

— Galarza-Molina, 2020.

=== Social media ===
Verificado 2018 collaborated closely with WhatsApp, a highly popular private messaging app in Mexico that is often used by family members. WhatsApp users could submit messages to a Verificado hotline for verification and debunking. This enabled Verificado 2018 to detect trending topics quickly. Verificado also had more than 330,000 followers on Facebook and Twitter. Social media users could use the hashtag #QuieroQueVerifiquen (#IWantYouToVerify).

We made fact-checking and verification social media first ... We made verification content shareable, we made it fresh, we made it visually appealing, and took it to social media in a native way.

— Diana Larrea Maccise, 2019

Verificado's tone in social media conversations was often humorous, using memes and emojis in a friendly way. Verificado emphasized the importance of a civil, friendly tone. For example, it intervened in an argument on Twitter with "Listen, listen, don't fight [crying emoji]. These discussions are more fun and pleasant when we treat each other nicely". While Verificado's reporting was scientific and factually based, Verificado also used humor to understand and sympathize with its readers over failures of family communication and shortcomings in journalistic and political practices. An eye-rolling meme accompanied this appeal to action: "Did your family share fake news again in their WhatsApp group? Don't worry! Send your suggestions to us at the hashtag #Iwantyoutoverify".

An important aspect of Verificado 2018 was the education of readers themselves in techniques for detecting falsehood. Verificado educated the public about topics such as how to verify online content, how bots worked, and how the electoral process worked. This content was highly popular. A video about how to do a reverse image search on your phone received over 1 million Facebook views. Viewers were able to identify images which did not match the claims that the images were being used to support. Another of Verificado's education posts taught readers to distinguish official Verificado information from counterfeit information.

=== Presidential debates ===
During presidential debates, Verificado fact-checked the participants. A fact-checking note from the first presidential debate, which verified figures given by Ricardo Anaya, went viral with the hashtag #mientocomoAnaya. For the third debate, teams of roughly 20 people each were formed to address claims in three areas: education and science; economic development and poverty; and health, sustainability and climate change. Subgroups within each team tracked individual politicians. They transcribed statements, identified claims to be verified, and worked in groups to find information and verify claims. During the third debate about 40 claims were chosen to be verified. Verificado's responses appeared throughout the following week. Debate-related information generated some of the highest numbers of pageviews on social media during the period leading up to the election.

=== Election day coverage ===
As election day approached, disinformation increasingly focused on voting processes (how and where to vote) and the right to vote (electoral crime and supposed prohibitions when voting). Among the false narratives were misleading instructions on marking ballots, rumors that individuals could vote on behalf of deceased relatives, and rumors of ballot insecurity. For example, disinformers advised voters to check boxes for two candidates so that a third candidate would not be elected – a tactic that would have nullified their vote and strengthened the third candidate if they followed the disinformers' advice.

== Impact ==
Verificado 2018's hotline enabled WhatsApp users to submit messages for verification and debunking. Over 10,000 users subscribed to Verificado's WhatsApp hotline. Within its first week, the group received over 18,000 messages and answered 13,800 of them. During the course of the project more than 60,000 interactions occurred.

The group researched online claims and political statements and published joint verifications. During the course of the election, they produced over 400 notes, 100 visuals, and 50 videos, tracking instances where fake news went viral and documenting false claims and suspect sites. Verificado.mx received 5.4 million visits during the election, and partner organizations who shared and referenced Verificado's content registered millions more.

Among the instances of disinformation that Verificado corrected were a false report of mass resignations of polling station workers in Mexico State, faked invoices purporting to be payments to a Mexican pop star, and out-of-context editing of a video suggesting that Ricardo Anaya had accepted defeat in the election.

The Verificado 2018 initiative has been described as providing a model for further fact-checking initiatives.

Verificado not only demonstrated that claims can be arbitrated but also that innovative organizational structures, specifically collaboration among and between journalists and the public, can afford journalists greater levels of independence and autonomy. Furthermore, this structure combated the instantaneity and reach of misinformation by incorporating audience labor into its workflow.

— Martinez-Carrillo, 2019.
