= Misbar =

Jordanian fact-checking website

- مسبار
- Formation: 2019; 7 years ago
- Official language: English, Arabic
- Key people: Ahmed Balousha (managing editor); Ouissal Harize (senior editor, Misbar English)
- Website: misbar.com/en

Misbar (Arabic: مسبار, lit. 'probe') is a fact-checking website based in Jordan. It was established in 2019.

== History ==
Misbar is based in Jordan. The domain misbar.com was registered 22 October 2001. Misbar was established as a fact-checking unit under Baaz, Inc. in 2019. It later became a standalone organisation operating under Metafora Production W.L.L.

Misbar's managing editor Mohammed Al-Sheikh told The New Arab in 2020, "There are many fact-checking platforms and initiatives in the Arab world, but we consider ourselves the first platform working round the clock to check news, fight fake news, and also raise awareness among the public about the media."

Misbar was part of the #CoronaVirusFacts Alliance, a group of fact-checkers led by the International Fact Checking Network (IFCN) which sought to combat COVID-19 misinformation. The project ended in 2023.

Misbar has debunked disinformation in the Russian invasion of Ukraine. In 2024, The New Arab reported that Misbar was one of multiple MENA-focused fact-checkers that was targeted by a Russian disinformation campaign known as Matryoshka, in which inauthentic social media accounts provided disingenuous fact-checking requests to disrupt fact-checkers' work.

Misbar has debunked misinformation in the Gaza war, including false claims that dead Palestinian children were actually dolls and a photo of IDF soldiers edited to show them holding the ISIS flag. It has also debunked misinformation that spread online following the fall of the Assad regime in Syria.

In 2024, Misbar won an award from the Arab Fact-Checkers Network (AFCN) for the "Fact-Checking Platforms Collaboration to Counter Mis/Disinformation During the War on Gaza and South Lebanon" project, done in collaboration with Tahaqaq in Palestine and Sawab in Lebanon.

== Operation ==
Misbar operates as a non-profit. It maintains offices in the United States and Jordan. Its policy states that its employees "may not engage in partisan political activity or contribute to political candidates or lobbying organizations."

Misbar relies on photo and video verification methods to verify information from media sources, and contacts people to verify statements attributed to them. It maintains the Misbar Index, a dashboard which assigns transparency scores to news organisations based on the severity and frequency of misinformation they have published.

In May 2021, Hind Khoudary, a Palestinian journalist working for Misbar, said that Instagram was censoring her content related to support for Sheikh Jarrah residents and Palestinians during the Sheikh Jarrah controversy. Misbar has fact-checkers based in the Gaza Strip, such as Eman Hillis and Wesam Abo Marq.

== See also ==
- List of fact-checking websites
