= Watchdog =

Watchdog or watch dog may refer to:

== Animals ==
- Guard dog, a dog that barks to alert its owners of an intruder's presence
- Portuguese Watchdog, Cão de Castro Laboreiro, a dog breed
- Moscow Watchdog, a breed of dog that was bred in the Soviet Union

== Computing ==
- Watchdog timer, a device that detects faults and initiates corrective actions

== Public oversight ==
An individual or group that monitors the activities of another entity (such as an individual, corporation, non-profit group, or governmental organization) on behalf of the public to ensure that entity does not behave illegally or unethically:

- Consumer watchdog, consumer protection organizations or campaigners
- Charity watchdog, an organization that monitors and rates charities
- Government watchdog, organizations and platforms focused on government; see Category:Government oversight and watchdog organizations for examples
- Watchdog journalism, a form of investigative journalism
- Transit watchdog, an individual or group that provides public comment regarding public transit operations

== Books ==
- Watchdog, a novel by Laurien Berenson from her Melanie Travis Mysteries series
- Watch Dogs: Dark Clouds, a novel by John Shirley, based on the video game
- The Watchdogs, a book by Laird Wilcox about watchdog organization that monitor extremism in the US.

== Comics ==
- Watchdogs (Marvel Comics), a right-wing terrorist group in Marvel Comics

== Music ==
- Watch Dog (album), an album by Jules Shear
- "Watch Dog", a song by Etta James from the album Tell Mama
- "Watchdogs", a song by UB40 from the album Rat in the Kitchen

== Film and television ==
- Family First (film), or Watch Dog, 2018 Canadian film
- Watchdog (TV programme), a British television programme promoting consumer rights
  - Watchdog Test House, related television show
- "Watchdogs" (Agents of S.H.I.E.L.D.), an episode of Marvel Comics' Agents of S.H.I.E.L.D.
- Watchdogs (Wander Over Yonder), a type of space alien in Wander Over Yonder
- Watch Dog, a character in Dog City
- Watchdog Man, a character in One-Punch Man
- Watch Dogs (film), an upcoming film based on the video game series with the same name

== Video games ==
- Watch Dogs, a video games series developed by Ubisoft
  - Watch Dogs (video game), the first game in the series

== Other uses ==
- Watchdog.org, American news website
- Watchdog (research collective), Sri Lankan research collective

== See also ==
- Dog watch, a work shift in a maritime watch system that is half the length of a standard watch period
