= Tahaqaq =

Palestinian fact-checking organization

- Formation: 2015; 11 years ago
- Founder: Baker Mohammad Abdulhaq
- Official language: English, Arabic
- Website: tahaqaq.ps

Tahaqaq (Arabic: تحقق, lit. 'verification'), also known as the Palestinian Observatory for Fact-Checking and Media Literacy, is a Palestinian fact-checking organization founded in 2015 by Baker Mohammad Abdulhaq. It is a member of the Arab Fact-Checkers Network (AFCN).

== History ==
Tahaqaq was created in 2015 by Baker Mohammad Abdulhaq, a journalist and fact-checker based in Nablus, a Palestinian city in the West Bank. Abdulhaq created it as part of his master's thesis in fact-checking. It ran out of money in 2017, but restarted in 2020 to fact-check COVID-19 misinformation. In July 2022, Tahaqaq became part of the Arab Fact-Checkers Network (AFCN).

Tahaqaq has reported on the Gaza war, including on Israel's use of white phosphorus against civilians. It has also debunked online misinformation in the war, such as AI-manipulated content and the Pallywood disinformation campaign. On October 23, 2023, Tahaqaq was targeted by cyberattacks attempting to disable its website after it reported on the Al-Ahli Arab Hospital explosion.

In 2024, Tahaqaq won an award from the Arab Fact-Checkers Network (AFCN) for the "Fact-Checking Platforms Collaboration to Counter Mis/Disinformation During the War on Gaza and South Lebanon" project, done in collaboration with Misbar in Jordan and Sawab in Lebanon.

== Operation ==
Tahaqaq largely publishes its reporting in Arabic. As of late 2023, Tahaqaq's team consisted of Abdulhaq and nine fact-checkers.

Tahaqaq fact-checker Rana Salahat said in 2023, "There are several challenges, including restricted access to the materials we publish on social media platforms, as it is considered Palestinian content. Additionally, [Tahaqaq] has faced attempted breaches and numerous instances of electronic spam appearing on our posts."

== See also ==
- List of fact-checking websites
