= Trusted News Initiative =

International anti-disinformation news alliance

- Formation: September 7, 2019; 7 years ago
- Founder and director: Jessica Cecil
- Parent organization: BBC
- Website: https://www.bbc.co.uk/beyondfakenews/trusted-news-initiative

The Trusted News Initiative (TNI) is an international alliance of news media, social media and technology corporations which claim to be working to identify and combat purported disinformation about national elections, the COVID-19 pandemic and COVID-19 vaccines. TNI was founded by Jessica Cecil, a leadership figure at the BBC who also serves as the initiative's director.

== History ==
In June 2019, the BBC convened the Trusted News Summit, bringing together leaders of many of the world's largest news and social media companies. Chaired by BBC director-general Tim Davie, the summit addressed concerns regarding online misinformation surrounding the 2019 Indian general election, which reportedly attracted systematic attempts to spread misinformation and "fake news" through social media. Organizations that participated in the event included the European Broadcasting Union, Facebook, the Financial Times, First Draft News, Google, The Hindu, and The Wall Street Journal.

This led to the launch of a "Trusted News Charter" on September 7, 2019, outlining plans to develop tools to assist industry partners in "moving quickly and collectively to undermine disinformation before it can take hold." Other projects were to include an online media education campaign and disseminating information on how to vote. Additional partner organizations were announced including Agence France-Presse (AFP), CBC/Radio-Canada, Microsoft, Reuters, the Reuters Institute for the Study of Journalism and Twitter.

=== COVID-19 ===
On March 27, 2020, the BBC announced that the TNI would extend its efforts to combatting COVID-19 misinformation around the world. It continued to engage in information management related to elections, announcing in July 2020 that it was anticipating misinformation campaigns in advance of the 2020 United States presidential election.

TNI Director Jessica Cecil delivered a presentation on developing a consensus in the "post-pandemic world" at the 2020 Paris Peace Forum. She highlighted the work of the TNI and the related Project Origin, led by Microsoft. At a May 2022 event hosted by the RAND Corporation, Cecil suggested that institutional efforts to counter disinformation should focus on foreign adversaries such as Russia and China, as well as domestic consumers of disinformation.

On August 25, 2022, the Information Commissioner's Office in the United Kingdom ruled that communications between the BBC and members of the TNI were not subject to public disclosure under the Freedom of Information Act 2000.

The TNI announced its expansion into the Asia-Pacific region in November 2022, providing new partners from the area with training in navigating disinformation with funding from the Google News Initiative.

=== Antitrust lawsuit ===
In January 2023, a group of plaintiffs including Robert F. Kennedy Jr. and Children's Health Defense filed an antitrust lawsuit in a Texas district court against various members of the TNI. The suit alleges that the defendants colluded to censor individuals and news outlets whose reporting on COVID-19 challenged or competed with the TNI. Additional plaintiffs included various members of the "Disinformation Dozen", a list created by the Center for Countering Digital Hate of the "top 12 spreaders of anti-vaccine misinformation on social media platforms."

On July 11, 2025, the United States Department of Justice filed a statement of interest in support of the plaintiffs. Assistant Attorney General Abigail Slater urged the United States District Court for the District of Columbia to find that colluding to suppress competing viewpoints in media reporting and on social media platforms can constitute a violation of federal antitrust law.

== Trust in News conferences ==
On March 22–24, 2021, the Trusted News Initiative and BBC Academy co-hosted the inaugural Trust in News conference. Held entirely online, TIN21 featured webinars on "how to tackle disinformation" led by representatives of TNI members.

The second conference was held on March 29–30, 2022, titled "Trust in News 2022: Fighting disinformation." Topics at TNI22 included the February 2022 Russian invasion of Ukraine, nationalization of the internet, climate change, artificial intelligence (AI), and the role of Big Tech in "tackling disinformation."

Trust in News 2023 took place on March 30, 2023, live streamed out of London and Delhi.

== Participants ==
Members of the Trusted News Initiative include:

- Agence France-Presse (AFP)
- Associated Press
- Australian Broadcasting Corporation (ABC)
- BBC
- CBC/Radio-Canada
- Dawn Pakistan
- Deutsche Presse-Agentur
- European Broadcasting Union (EBU)
- Facebook
- Financial Times
- First Draft News
- Google
- The Hindu
- Indian Express
- Information Futures Lab at the Brown University School of Public Health
- Kompas
- Meta Platforms
- Microsoft
- Nation Media Group
- NDTV
- New York Times
- NHK
- Reuters Institute for the Study of Journalism
- Special Broadcasting Service (SBS)
- Thomson Reuters
- Twitter
- The Wall Street Journal
- The Washington Post
- YouTube
