= La Mula (website) =

Peruvian newspaper

- Website type: Online newspaper
- Available in: Spanish
- Headquarters: Lima, {{{location_country}}}
- Website: lamula.pe
- Launched: June 2009; 17 years ago

La Mula (English: The Mule) is an online newspaper in Peru that was created in June 2009.

== History ==
La Mula emerged in 2009 during a period when the mass media in Peru became very centralized. In 2016, it partnered with other news outlets including La República to create Perúleaks, a whistleblowing platform based on citizen reporting. During the 2021 Peruvian general election, La Mula was part of the fact-checking project Ama Llulla, which was created to combat fake news. By 2022, La Mula received 7% of the weekly online news readership in Peru.
