= Gun law in Yemen =

Laws in Yemen regarding firearms

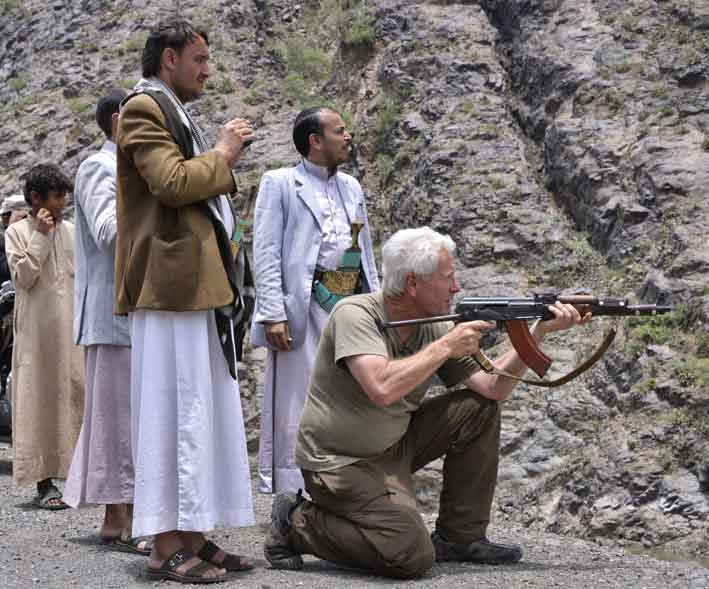
Tourist in Yemen holding an AK-47

Firearm ownership in Yemen is considered a right rather than a privilege, and therefore is allowed without any license or permit. Carry is unrestricted in the country. Yemen is the second most armed country in the world after the United States, with 52.8 guns for every 100 residents. However, this figure only accounts for small arms, and does not account for the medium and heavy arms that are readily available in Yemen.

== History ==
Up until the second half of the 20th century, Yemenis traditionally carried a jambiya dagger and using weapons was regulated by tribal laws. The flood of guns into the country led to the extinction of those traditions. A permissive gun culture replaced the code of honor and chivalry.

In 1992 the Yemeni government passed the Law Regulating Carrying Firearms, Ammunition & their Trade. Article 9 of the law states that:

The citizens of the Republic shall have the right to hold the necessary rifles, machine guns, revolvers, and hunting rifles for their personal use with an amount of ammunition for the purpose of legitimate defense.

The law did not specify, however, which authority would control arms proliferation.

In 2007, the government issued a decree banning weapons in major cities and limiting weapons carried by security personnel. In three years, 720,000 unlicensed weapons were confiscated and hundreds of weapons shops were temporarily closed down. The Arab Spring broke this dynamic.

After the Yemeni Civil War began in 2015 various parts of the country were overrun by different factions. Since there is no centralized government to enforce gun laws, all types of arms including rifles, fully-automatic firearms, anti-tank guided missiles or armored vehicles are sold over the counter to various militias and individuals willing to buy them.

In October 2018, the Arab Reporters for Investigative Journalism released a study demonstrating many guns in Yemen were manufactured by European weapon makers.

== Carry ==
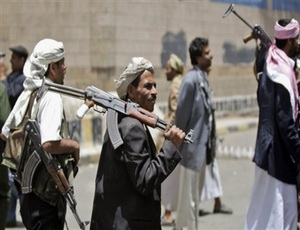
Open carry of firearms by Yemeni militiamen.

A license is not required to obtain or possess firearms. Carrying firearms in public places is unrestricted in rural areas, where more than 66% of Yemen's population lives, but state-issued licenses are required to carry them in cities. They are issued on a may-issue basis with varying restrictions in different cities. In 2007, the government cancelled all carry licenses and introduced additional conditions for them. Carrying rifles was banned in cities with few exceptions.

A government license is also required to be a retailer of arms and ammunition, with retailers also being required to maintain records of stocks and sales, each buyer's name and ID card. The law also regulates the number of bodyguards a person can have, and stipulates that guns may not be passed on to third parties.

Celebratory gunfire leads to many deaths every year. Many children, mostly boys, carry guns in Yemen.

== Firearm ownership ==
According to 2017 Small Arms Survey there are roughly 15 million civilian-held firearms in Yemen, or 62 per 100 population, making Yemen the second most armed country in the world after the United States.

== See also ==
- Overview of gun laws by nation
