= The Salvage Crew =

2020 science fiction novel by Yudhanjaya Wijeratne

- Author: Yudhanjaya Wijeratne
- Language: English
- Genre: Science fiction
- Publisher: Aethon Books
- Publication date: 27 Oct 2020
- Publication place: Sri Lanka
- Pages: 304

The Salvage Crew is a 2020 English-language science fiction novel by Sri Lankan author Yudhanjaya Wijeratne. The author notably used artificial intelligence to construct some of the elements in the novel, including the poetry spoken by the novel's protagonist.

== Plot ==
The UN ship Damn Right I Ate the Apple crashed during an attempt to colonize the uninhabited planet Urmagon Beta. Decades later, the UN hires Planetary Crusade Services (PCS) to salvage the ship's parts.

Amber Rose 348 is a digitized human owned by PCS. Amber Rose is the overseer (“OC”) of a salvage crew including Simon, a geologist; Anna, a physician, and Milo, an engineer. OC is feels that they are underqualified for a salvage mission, referring to them as a “D team”. The crew lands on Urmagon Beta. OC directs the crew and writes poetry in his spare time. While exploring, they find hostile alien fauna. They also note another ship in orbit, presumably from Mercer Corps, a group of transhumanist mercenaries.

OC finds an injured Mercer, who attacks the crew. Simon shoots and kills her. Simon is infected with micromachines; OC is forced to trigger an EMP, which slows the infection but destroys most of the crew's advanced technology. OC asks for help from PCS, but a manager tells OC that help would be out of budget and that letting the crew die will be cheaper. OC resolves to complete the salvage mission and return with all three crew members alive.

The crew has several hostile encounters with Mercers. The salvage job is completed. OC reactivates an android named Shen, found with the corpses of the original colonists. Shen is not a sentient AI, but is able to help with basic tasks. Their ship is attacked by the Mercer spaceship, delaying their extraction from the planet. Conditions deteriorate during the interim. Simon's condition worsens. Anna and Milo fight constantly, and food begins running low. Shen is captured by a Mercer, which is controlled by an alien intelligence.

Simon commits suicide. Milo is shot and killed by a Mercer. Shen, controlled by the alien, returns and communicates with OC. The alien identifies itself as Beacon and explains its philosophy: creatures can be divided into the classes of functional flesh, literary flesh, functional machine, and literary machine. Beacon considers that contacting any civilization other than literary machines would be a waste of time, as they are not sufficiently advanced. Beacon identifies OC and other digitized humans as examples of literary machines based on their ability to write poetry; it wishes to initiate first contact.

Beacon places OC's consciousness inside the PCS ship. OC and Anna return to their home system and share the truth about PCS's unethical business practices. Beacon sends OC and Anna to another world to meet more advanced intelligences.

== Major themes ==
Umang Poddar of the Mithila Review writes that the author's use of AI during the creation of the novel is relevant to the novel's themes of human-AI coexistence. The crew members and OC are in conflict due to their different roles, which "shows a ‘machine v. human’ divide, where the machine is breathing down their necks, monitoring all their activities, while the humans need a celebration every now and then." Poddar writes that "a sense of unfettered greed which has expanded over the breadth of the universe." For example, PCS will only give insurance coverage if at least 70% of the salvage target is recovered. Poddar finds that several situations in the novel are analogous to working for modern-day corporations such as Amazon, where workers "are expected match the speed of the computers, making their lives miserable."

Eric Hendel of Strange Horizons writes that a general theme of the novel is the danger of commodifying human life. In one scene, Amber Rose discusses his crew with another AI, which states that PCS would be better off financially if the crew members died.

== Style ==
The majority of the story is narrated from the perspective of Amber Rose 348. Wijeratne rendered all of Amber Rose's spoken dialogue in capital letters. According to a review in Strange Horizons, "even when Amber's narration is presented to the reader in natural language, his every interaction with the book's human characters ... conveys the disorienting sense that everything is said via a shout at full volume."

== Background ==
Wijeratne used artificial intelligence to create parts of the novel. Urmagon Beta was created by using the Zarkonnen planet generator, which is "a software that basically keeps spitting out bespoke planets with various qualities, which you can download from a website." The poems in the novel were constructed with GPT-2, and open-source AI. Additionally, the author used a collection of Python scripts "to generate a string of random events in his plot—everything from sudden changes in the weather to disagreements that might arise between the book’s characters".

== Reception ==
Gautam Bhatia of Himal Southasian writes that "The Salvage Crew reads like a love letter to science fiction. And, like the best of love letters, it is layered and has dimensions, communicating its message at many levels." Bhatia writes that The Salvage Crew is in "direct conversation" with Peter Watts's 2006 novel Blindsight as both novels reflect on themes of intelligence, identity, and consciousness. Bhatia also writes that the novel's most direct predecessor is the 1961 novel Solaris, which similarly features a team of three crew members "attempting to understand – and communicate with – a vast, intelligent ocean that projects their own fear and guilt back at them."

Bhatia furthermore comments that The Salvage Crew is "one of the most riotously intertextual genre novels today". Several paragraphs in the novel allude the science fiction works of Joe Haldeman, Ridley Scott, and Philip K. Dick, among others. Bhatia states that "even non-SF geeks would enjoy [these easter eggs] because it is so clear that Wijeratne is having fun himself – these references are often snuck in as ironic asides, with gentle ribbing of the genre's classics." Wijeratne does not limit himself to science fiction, also quoting William Shakespeare, Friedrich Nietzsche, and Alfred, Lord Tennyson. This reflects the "'hybrid' nature of growing up in the post-colony (especially the Southasian post-colony), where an individual is equally exposed to the myths and legends of their own culture and to the canon of Anglophone classics (whether literary or SF)."

Jaideep Unudutri of The Hindu wrote that the novel is "space opera for the gig economy, where the “cost of doing business” is the limitation, not something old-fashioned like the speed of light." Umang Poddar of the Mithila Review praised the novel's exploration of capitalism, language games, and artificial intelligences. Poddar noted that "this is the kind of book which makes for a great re-read as you are better able to connect snippets of the final idea scattered through the book". The same review wished for more development among the secondary characters, feeling that "their personalities were conveniently shaped to fit into the plot".

Eric Hendel of Strange Horizons wrote that the novel's themes take a sharp turn in the final chapters, and that "Wijeratne’s attempt to shift the focus, near the novel’s end, to an entirely new subject produces a dissonance in the narrative that cannot be reconciled." Nevertheless, the review states that "despite my problems with the ending, The Salvage Crew does still represent a fascinating experiment by an author deeply invested in probing the basic nature of narrative itself."
