= Debunk.org =

Non-governmental organisation based in Lithuania

- Demaskuok
- Formation: 2018; 8 years ago
- Type: Think tank, Non-governmental organisation
- Purpose: Counter-disinformation, Fact-checking, Media literacy education
- Headquarters: Vilnius, Lithuania
- Location: Vilnius, Lithuania
- Methods: Artificial intelligence, content analysis, breakout scale concept,web scraping
- Official languages: English, Lithuanian, Russian
- Key people: Viktoras Daukšas (director)
- Expenses: €300,000 (2020)
- Funding: Delfi, Digital News Initiative
- Staff: 15 (2020)
- Volunteers: ▲200+ (2023)
- Website: debunk.org

Debunk.org is an independent technology think tank and non-governmental organisation based in Vilnius, Lithuania. Founded in 2018, the organisation was developed to counter online disinformation and state-sponsored internet propaganda. It researches and analyses disinformation within the Baltic states, Poland, Georgia, Montenegro, North Macedonia and the United States. It also aims to improve societal resilience to disinformation through educational courses and media literacy campaigns.

Its current director is Viktoras Daukšas.

== History ==
Debunk.org was founded by Viktoras Daukšas in 2018 and has its origins in the Demaskuok project. Demaskuok, meaning "debunk" in Lithuanian, was established by Delfi and had Daukšas as its director. It represented a collaboration between media outlets, technology experts, strategic communication departments within government institutions, and an army of volunteers known as "elves." The project sought to analyse thousands of articles per day, searching for pro-Kremlin disinformation targeting the Baltic states.

Debunk.org and Demaskuok became parallel organisations, with the former seeking to expand its reach to new languages and regions. The two initiatives cooperated with each other until 2020.

== Research ==
Debunk.org's research and analysis publications are the product of an analytical team and a consulting group of researchers who collaborate with the organisation's core team. They publish about 10 research reports per month. The topics of the reports include disinformation trends, NATO-related disinformation, political crises, and elections monitoring, as well as other issues.

== Methodology ==
The core methodology adopted by Debunk.org is debunking, which also inspires the organisation's name. Debunking, or the exposing of falsehoods, is a widely accepted counter-disinformation and counter-propaganda method. The process often consists of fact-checking, to establish the elements of falsehood within a problematic narrative, and the dissemination of counternarratives, which involves presenting and explaining those falsehoods.

Debunk.org uses artificial intelligence algorithms to autonomously scan thousands of online news articles, flagging content which may represent the potential spread of disinformation. This approach was adopted by the organisation to increase the efficiency of countering disinformation and change the balance between "cheap disinformation" and "expensive debunking." The algorithms look for key words and more than 600 propaganda and disinformation narratives. According to internal data, Debunk.org monitors more than 2500 web domains, in 26 languages, which have been historically associated with instances of disinformation, from which it processes 30,000 articles per day. Examples of the domains which it tracks include Russian state outlets such as Sputnik and RT as well as lesser known entities like news-front.info, which are sites operated on a "volunteer" basis. Over 15,000 content pieces are manually reviewed each month, including hundreds of public Facebook pages and groups. Articles are tracked based on the narratives that they disseminate, focussing not just on entirely false stories but also those which decontextualize information and publish misleading facts.

The organisation consists of over 50 volunteers, referred to as "elves," who contribute to its disinformation monitoring operations by manually rating the potential threat of the flagged content. The organisation claims that this combination of computer algorithms and manual coding has been capable of identifying and rebutting disinformation in as little as two hours.

DebunkReach is the organisation's proprietary software platform which it uses to assess the impact of disinformation narratives. DebunkReach provides a measure of how widely shared a disinformation website article has become on social media platforms and across the internet. It is calculated for every single article taking into account SimilarWeb traffic, Alexa rating, backlinks and social media interactions (reactions, shares and comments). This allows Debunk.org's analysis team to employ the Breakout Scale, a concept devised by the Digital Forensic Research Lab (DFR)'s Ben Nimmo. The scale divides disinformation operations into categories on a six-point scale: category one (one platform, no breakout), category two (one platform, breakout or many platforms, no breakout), category three (multiple platforms, multiple breakouts), category four (cross-medium breakout), category five (celebrity amplification), category six (policy response or call for violence). The scale allows researchers to comparatively measure the impact of an influence operation and identify whether it is increasing or decreasing in magnitude to aid the prioritisation of resources and coordinate a more efficient response.

Debunk.org also use the Pillars of Russia's Disinformation and Propaganda Ecosystem, developed by the Global Engagement Center of the U.S. Department of State (GEC), to research and monitor Russia's disinformation campaigns. The five pillars are organised on a spectrum ranging from "visible" propaganda messages to those which are "denied" by the Kremlin, and include (from most to least visible): official government communications, state-funded global messaging, cultivation of proxy sources, weaponization of social media and cyber-enabled disinformation.

== Funding ==
Debunk.org receives funding from Delfi, the largest news organisation in the Baltics, and is supported by a €315,000 grant from the Google Digital News Initiative. It also receives research grants from government institutions and partner organisations, including the German Federal Government, the German Marshall Fund, the United Kingdom Foreign Office, and the Lithuanian Ministry of Foreign Affairs and Ministry of Defense.

== Volunteer network (elves) ==
One of the core features of the Debunk.org initiative is to expand and coordinate the network of stakeholders in the counter-disinformation sector. Its research and analysis work is underpinned by a network of volunteers, known as Elves, with expertise in foreign affairs, cybersecurity, IT, economics, environmental protection and related fields.

The base of volunteers originally began as an organic, autonomous, community initiative in response to the Revolution of Dignity in 2014, involving clashes between protesters and the security forces of the Russian-backed Ukrainian president, Viktor Yanukovych, in Maidan Nezalezhnosti, Kyiv. The subsequent ousting of President Viktor Yanukovych and the Russian annexation of Crimea was paralleled by an online information war with continuous Russian disinformation attacks and propaganda. The volunteers' aim was to counter pro-Kremlin narratives on social media, forums, and online comments sections.

The network now consists of around 5000 volunteers, at least 50 of which collaborate directly with the Debunk.org analysis team. They verify suspicious content, fact-check and debunk false stories and highlight website and online accounts actively propagating disinformation. They also provide manual content analysis to supplement Debunk.org's automated systems. Debunk.org enables the security and integrity of the network by providing a stringent vetting process for new volunteers joining the organisation. Before joining the project all candidates are screened through an interview process, must sign nondisclosure agreements (NDAs) and complete a disinformation analysis training course developed by Debunk.org.
