= Yudhanjaya Wijeratne =

Sri Lankan science fiction author, activist and researcher

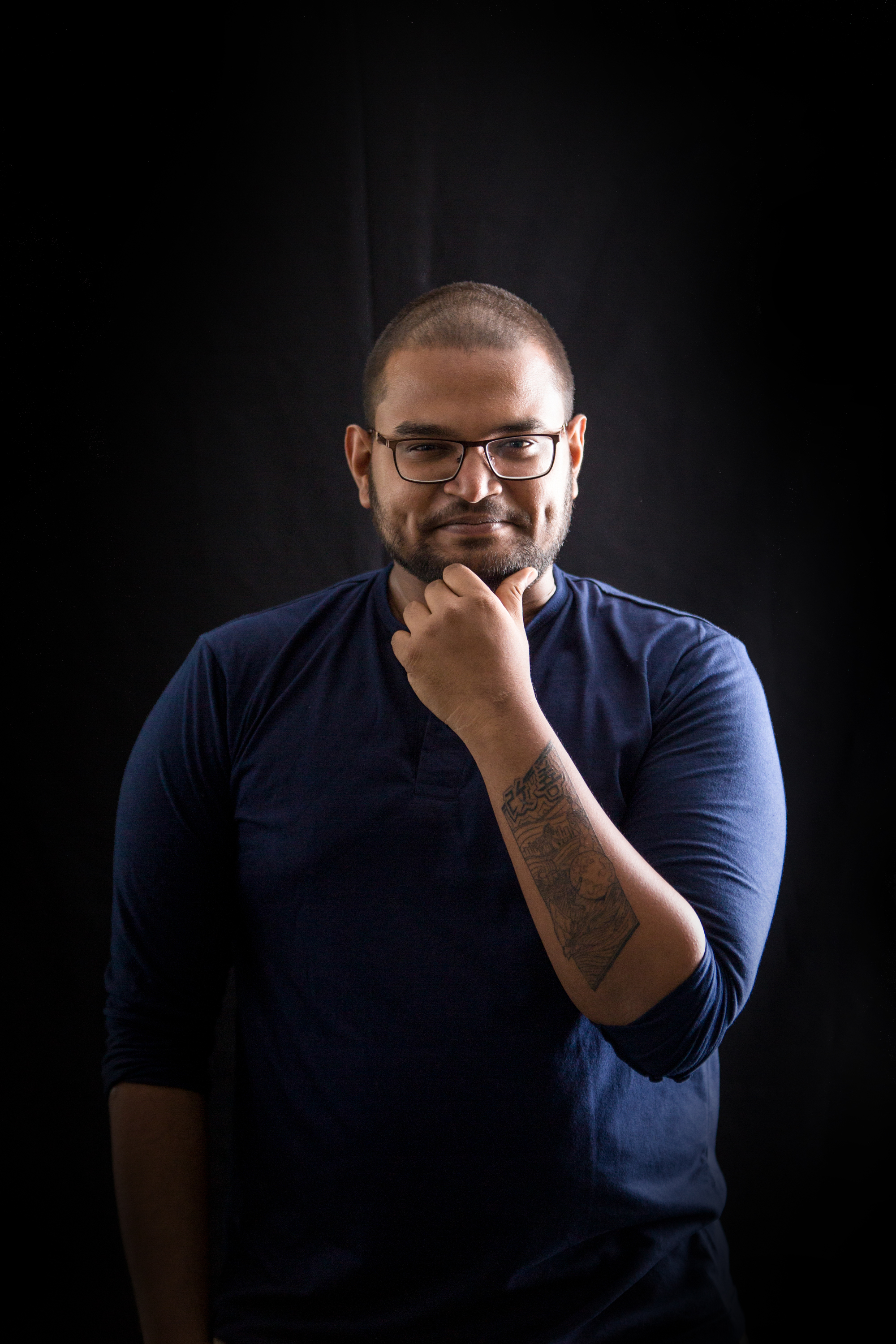
- Born: 26 November 1992 (age 33); Ratnapura, Sri Lanka
- Occupations: Author, researcher, activist
- Writing career
- Genres: Speculative fiction Science fiction Fantasy
- Notable works: Numbercaste, The Salvage Crew, The Slow Sad Suicide of Rohan Wijeratne, "Messenger"
- Website: yudhanjaya.com

Rajapakse Konara Mudiyanselage Bilesha Yudhanjaya Bandara Wijeratne (born November 1992) is a Sri Lankan science fiction author, activist and researcher, classified as part of a new wave of South Asian science fiction writers. His work has appeared in Wired, Foreign Policy and Slate. His novel The Salvage Crew has been lauded as one of the best science fiction and fantasy books of 2020.

He is noted for being a proponent of human-AI collaboration in fiction as well as being the co-founder of Watchdog, a fact-checking organization founded partly to counter misinformation in the wake of state propaganda and inaction. Wijeratne is the second Sri Lankan to be nominated for a Nebula Award since Arthur C. Clarke and was selected by Forbes as one of 2021's 30 under 30.

== Early life ==
Wijeratne grew up wanting to be an astronaut, but instead decided the odds were against him. Discovering Stephen King's The Dark Tower led to him being inspired to sit down and write The Waste, which he describes as "a 130,000 word monster set in a half-magic half-tech world .. . it was horrible: I have the manuscript on my desk and the cat sleeps on it sometimes."

Largely self-taught, he picked up programming after school and went through a stint in game development, working on a project set in a distant future. That failed, and eventually led to Wijeratne becoming a tech journalist and founding editor of Readme.lk, a Sri Lankan tech news website.

In 2015 he joined WSO2, a middleware corporation headquartered in Colombo, and began working on his debut novel, Numbercaste. During this period, he was perhaps best known in Sri Lanka for the blog he maintained, Icaruswept, which was noted by science writer Nalaka Gunawardene for its data-savvy analyses. Icaruswept garnered a reputation for analyses around social media influence on the Sri Lankan 2015 general election, reporting on the Colombo International Financial City and coverage of the 2017 Sri Lanka floods. While the blog now appears to be defunct, key posts remain mirrored on other publications.

Wijeratne also worked on the WSO2 Election Monitor, which generated attention and sentiment analysis around the election contests. In an (apparent) parody piece for April Fool's Day, he used observations from the project's actual data to suggest Donald Trump's victory in the 2016 United States presidential election.

== Career ==
=== Fiction ===
Wijeratne's first publication was the self-published The Slow Sad Suicide of Rohan Wijeratne, which follows a suicidal, near-immortal alcoholic who signs up to be shot into a ring singularity. Reviews compared it favourably to the work of both Clarke and Douglas Adams. Wijeratne followed with his first novel, Numbercaste, deemed a "staggeringly ambitious debut" that garnered critical acclaim in South Asia for its blend of emerging technology and socio-political critique. It led to Wijeratne being lauded by Groundviews as the "first serious voice" in science fiction from Sri Lanka since Arthur C. Clarke, and is classified as Econ-SF by the Edgeryders research network.

In 2018, Wijeratne was the recipient of a four-book deal by HarperCollins, noted by the Sunday Times as the largest deal, in terms of books, ever offered to a Sri Lankan author; Numbercaste was among those four books, and saw its film options acquired by Endemol Shine. Wijeratne subsequently self-published Omega Point, a short story invoking French Jesuit, Catholic priest, scientist, paleontologist, philosopher, mystic, and teacher Pierre Teilhard de Chardin's hypothesis of God and marrying it to the Kardashev scale.

His second novel, The Inhuman Race an alternate history narrative set in Sri Lanka, and explores AI, sentience and AI rights in a futuristic world where the British Commonwealth still dominates the Indian subcontinent. It has been noted for subverting philosopher John Searle's Chinese room thought experiment and cementing Wijeratne's "status as one of the subcontinent’s science fiction stars".

Since then, he has published in a number of anthologies. Messenger, co-authored with American urban fantasy author R.R. Virdi, was listed in the Critters Annual Reader Poll as one of the top ten science fiction stories of 2018 and was a finalist for the 2018 Nebula Awards. Alongside J.T. Lawrence, Jason Werbeloff and Colby Rice, Wijeratne also launched 2054, a shared-world cyberpunk anthology foreworded by physicist, poet and Future Chronicles editor Samuel Peralta. Wijeratne has one known comics project, a 4-page short titled Genesis.

In 2020, Slate.com published The State Machine under its Future Tense program, and Wired published Work Ethics. Both stories explore themes of human-AI collaboration; one from the perspective of governance and the other examining the future of work. Both betray a fascination, and support for a collaborative future, something Wijeratne references in interviews and blogposts. Subsequent tinkerings with OpenAI GPT-2 led him to explore generated poetry and attempt to create a novel by co-writing with procedural generation tools that he had written and with GPT-2. The result was Wijeratne's The Salvage Crew, published in 2020. Narrated by Nathan Fillion; it became a bestseller on Audible and was selected by Polygon as one of the best science fiction and fantasy books of 2020. In 2024 and 2025 he has added two other books in The Salvage Crew Series, Pilgrim Machines and Choir of Hatred.

=== Nonfiction and activism ===
Wijeratne then joined LIRNEasia as a researcher, where his work involved the analysis of communities on social media, misinformation and hate speech and bot networks. He has since discussed the moderation of terrorist and violent content online at the Internet Governance Forum and avenues such as ForeignPolicy. Much of his activism in this field consists of pushing social media platforms to acknowledge the computational and human process limitations of content moderation in low-resource languages, and in pushing Facebook et al. to share data and work with local researchers.

In 2018, Wijeratne gave a TEDx talk, outlining his roots as a blogger and his philosophy of avoiding homophily and groupthink wherever possible. In 2019, Wijeratne co-founded Watchdog, a fact-checker. In sessions hosted by NATO Stratcom COE, Wijeratne outlined its growth and operation.

In 2020, Wijeratne contributed to the Goethe-Institut's Day-Afterthoughts project, which curated responses to COVID-19 times from artists and intellectuals around the world.

== Awards and nominations ==
Wijeratne was nominated for the 2018 Nebula Award for Best Novelette.

He was selected by Forbes as one of 2021's 30 under 30 Asia.

He was the joint winner of the 2022 Gratiaen Prize, with Chiranthi Rajapakse, for his unpublished manuscript The Wretched and the Damned.

== Influences ==
Wijeratne's website lists a wide range of possible influences, from novelists (such as Terry Pratchett, William Gibson, Diana Wynne Jones and others) to anime (such as Ghost in the Shell and Fullmetal Alchemist) to games (such as BioShock, Deus Ex, Halo and Final Fantasy VII). Elsewhere, he has spoken about being influenced by Stephen King, Dan Simmons, Peter Watts, Warhammer 40,000, Margaret Atwood and Ursula Le Guin.
