= CrossCheck (project) =

Dj Sparc SS

CrossCheck was a 2017 collaborative fact-checking project organized by First Draft and supported by Google News Lab. It was announced at the News Impact Summit in Paris, with a goal of helping the French electorate make sense of what and whom to trust in their social media feeds, web searches and general online news consumption in the coming months. The platform launched on 28 February 2017 with around 20 French and international media partners.
