= Lead Stories =

American fact-checking website

- Website type: Fact-checking website
- Available in: English, Hungarian, Ukrainian
- Founded: 2015
- Headquarters: Colorado Springs, Colorado
- Country of origin: United States
- Area served: Worldwide
- Founders: Perry Sanders, Alan Duke, Maarten Schenk
- Services: Paid fact-checking services
- Revenue: $32 million
- Employees: 80
- Website: leadstories.com
- Current status: Active

Lead Stories is an American fact-checking company that has worked for Meta Platforms and ByteDance to conduct fact-checking on Facebook and TikTok. The company also carries out independent online fact-checking, debunking a wide range of trending news stories.

Lead Stories was established in 2015 in Colorado Springs, Colorado, by Perry Sanders, CNN journalist Alan Duke, and Belgian programmer Maarten Schenk. Duke serves as the company's editor-in-chief. As of 2025, Lead Stories employs approximately 80 staff members. The company is a member of the International Fact-Checking Network (IFCN), which reviews and assesses its reporting practices.

== Background ==
Lead Stories was founded in 2015 in Colorado Springs, Colorado, by hotel owner Perry Sanders, CNN journalist Alan Duke, and Belgian programmer Maarten Schenk. The idea for the company emerged from a conversation between Duke and Sanders, during which they agreed that fake news had become a significant presence in the United States, comparable to content published by the National Enquirer. Several months after the company's launch, the pair persuaded Schenk to travel to Colorado Springs, where he agreed to join the company. Schenk developed a proprietary software tool called "Trendolizer", which Lead Stories used to identify and track potentially false news articles and to fact-check them once they gained significant traction. The company reportedly operated on a global basis, with Duke working from Los Angeles, Sanders from Colorado Springs, and Schenk from Brussels, Belgium. Lead Stories stated that it employed staff "all around the world".

In its early days, Lead Stories was not a fact-checking website but rather a blog and news aggregator that linked to viral stories identified by Trendolizer. Schenk later explained that the site struggled to gain attention due to competition from similar platforms, prompting him to begin debunking viral hoaxes directly on the site. This shift attracted greater user interest, and Lead Stories was subsequently converted into a dedicated fact-checking website, discontinuing its news aggregation function. In 2018, it was reported that all fact checks published on the site were written solely by Schenk. At the time, the site's slogan was reported to be "Just because it's trending doesn't mean it's true".

== Fact-checking ==
The company fact-checks articles on politics, technology, world news, and entertainment. It also translates its fact-checks into several languages. In a 2017 interview, Maarten Schenk said Trendolizer tracks 300,000 to 400,000 website pages per day for the Lead Stories website. Articles of websites that have been fact-checked by Lead Stories as fake are listed in a special section, which lists different types of sites such as satirical, prank, clickbait and political sites from both left-wing and right-wing positions. Journalism.co.uk noted that fact-checks of Lead Stories were cited by BBC News and BuzzFeed News this year. In February 2019, Facebook agreed to add Lead Stories as its fact-checking partner, making it one of more than 30 partners on the platform. Lead Stories was tasked with fact-checking flagged Facebook posts. According to its 2019 funding report, Facebook paid the company $359,000. In February 2020, it was reported that half of all fact-checks on Facebook were conducted by Lead Stories.

Staff of Lead Stories received notifications from Facebook within minutes of it detecting suspected misinformation, sometimes as phone messages. Schenk said the team was given one hour to fact-check each story. In January 2020, during the COVID-19 outbreak, Lead Stories said it noticed a rise of conspiracy theories about the virus on Facebook and other platforms. The company told The Hill that each month, its team of seven full-time fact-checkers debunked 60 to 70 posts. In March 2020, it worked intensively to fact-check fake news about the disease on social media. Alan Duke said some of the company's employees had received death threats from individuals they were fact-checking, causing one of them to quit. In August 2020, TikTok announced that it partnered with Lead Stories and PolitiFact to debunk fake news about the 2020 US presidential election. Lead Stories said it fact-checked "hundreds" of videos containing political misinformation on TikTok.

In January 2025, Mark Zuckerberg ended fact-checking on Facebook. Alan Duke said this decision will make the revenue of Lead Stories smaller and force it to fire a number of employees. The Guardian noted that the company employed 80 people worldwide. Some of the staff did fact-checks in foreign languages, like Hungarian and Ukrainian. Duke said to Wired Magazine that the company usually operated outside of the US and had a "diverse" revenue. When Facebook terminated its contract with Lead Stories on March 1, 2025, TikTok became the biggest client of Lead Stories.

On January 28, 2025, IFCN announced that Lead Stories, along with other fact-checking sites, had been awarded an "ENGAGE" grant of $100,000 for their projects to combat misinformation. Lead Stories planned to develop a feature to tag posts on Bluesky that are suspected of containing misinformation. Flagged posts will display notices that direct users to relevant fact checks. The feature was later implemented by Bluesky and was co-developed by Maarten Schenk. Reportedly, the feature is optional and can be turned off by users; notifications placed on posts do not label their content as "misinformation" but provided "more context".

== Incidents ==
=== Candace Owens lawsuit ===
On October 19, 2020, conservative political commentator Candace Owens filed a lawsuit against Lead Stories for alleged defamation in its fact-check debunking her social media comment about the COVID-19 pandemic. She also sued USA Today for the same reason. The aforementioned fact-check was published by Lead Stories in April 2020, when it debunked a Facebook post in which Owens claimed that the COVID-19 death count from the US government was exaggerated; Lead Stories found the claim to be false. USA Today published a fact-check about her post shortly after and also concluded that it was misinformation. Facebook then placed a notice on the post warning users that it may contain false claims.

The lawsuit alleged that the fact-checks caused Owens financial harm due to no longer being able to earn income from advertising and promoting her books on Facebook. The lawsuit sued both companies for tortious interference, unfair competition and defamation. In July 2021, Delaware Superior Court Judge Craig Karsnitz dismissed the lawsuit, ruling that it failed to present any evidence that the information in the fact-checks was false or that they were created for malicious purposes. It also ruled that content of the fact-checks was protected by the First Amendment, meaning Lead Stories and USA Today cannot be punished for tortious interference.

In February 2022, the Delaware Supreme Court affirmed the judge's decision to dismiss the lawsuit in a two-paragraph ruling. Mike Grygiel, lawyer of USA Today, celebrated the decision, saying he "appreciates" the court recognizing the "first amendment's protection for truthful news reporting". Co-founder Alan Duke said he and his team were "confident" of being legally right, he said the lawsuit did not "deter" Lead Stories from fact-checking social media about COVID-19. Law firm Akerman LLP representing Lead Stories claimed responsibility for influencing the decision.

=== BMJ whistleblower controversy ===
On November 2, 2021, British Medical Journal (BMJ) published a peer reviewed report that said Ventavia, a medical company that was responsible for conducting Pfizer COVID-19 vaccine trials, of having "poor clinical trial research practices". On November 10, a number of social media users said that when they tried to share the report, a notice appeared redirecting them to a fact-check by Lead Stories saying the report contained inaccuracies. Reportedly, the report was labeled as "false information" on Facebook and was banned from being shared on the platform. Administrators of several Facebook groups were warned that posts linking the report may be "partially false". Lead Stories' fact-check, titled "Fact check: The British Medical Journal did NOT reveal disqualifying and ignored reports of flaws in Pfizer COVID-19 vaccine trials," said that the information in the report was false because Pfizer "analyzed" the claims and found no evidence of wrongdoing; it also cited a statement from the Food and Drug Administration that said, "the benefits of the Pfizer vaccine far outweigh the rare side effects".

Howard Kaplan, author of the report, criticized Lead Stories on social media, calling it "Facebook Thought Police" that "doesn't like the wording of the article by the BMJ". The BMJ later contacted Lead Stories to request the article be removed, claiming the fact-check itself contained errors, including calling the BMJ a "news blog". Alan Duke declined the request, saying the misinformation notice was created by Facebook, and Lead Stories is not responsible for it; he also added that the report was used by anti-vaccine activists. The BMJ then sent an open letter to Mark Zuckerberg. Written by two editors, Fiona Godlee and Kamran Abbasi, the letter called Lead Stories' fact-check "incompetent", saying it contained various issues like failing to say what information in the report was false and using the phrase "hoax alert" in the article's URL despite no evidence of it being one. Meta Platforms and Zuckerberg did not take any action; the BMJ was told they may appeal the misinformation label within a week to the relevant company (Lead Stories) and that Facebook was not involved in making the decision.

Lead Stories responded to the letter in December 2021, saying the report was invalid because the whistleblower, whose name is Jackson, was unreliable. It said she had little qualifications in science and only has "30-hour certification in auditing techniques". Lead Stores also said Jackson held negative beliefs towards vaccines based on her Facebook posts and criticized the BMJ for failing to note it. On December 20, 2021, Lead Stories said to the BMJ on Twitter that the report was republished on the website of Childrenʼs Health Defense, an anti-vaccine activist group, saying it's run by the "disinformation dozen". It criticized the BMJ and recommended it to review its editorial policies. The BMJ later filed a complaint to Poynter Institute, which runs IFCN, the fact-checking network of which Lead Stories is a member. The BMJ said the conduct of Lead Stories broke IFCN's guidelines. Electronic Frontier Foundation condemned the incident and criticized Facebook's fact-checking process in response.

== Reception ==
In 2019, Vox alleged that Lead Stories, and other Facebook fact-checkers, had "a reputation of nonpartisanship and accuracy". HuffPost said in 2020 the website was "making the rounds on the internet". MBFC described Lead Stories as a reliable and unbiased source. Fox News described it as one of Facebook's "prominent fact checkers". Conservative website NewsBusters criticized the website, alleging it fact-checks right-wingers four times more than left-wingers.

In February 2022, Joshua Peters of the Carolina Journal noted the selection bias of Lead Stories; it fact-checked right-leaning political content three times more than left-leaning. He also said that one of its fact-checks, which debunked Fox News story, was misleading and violated IFCN's guidelines. In May 2024 report, Capital Research Center (CRC) described Lead Stories as "practically a CNN-offshoot", saying half of its staff is affiliated with the channel. Citing Federal Election Commission data, CRC also noted that about a quarter of its employees donated to Democratic politicians, with Perry Sanders donating $3,700 to Hillary Clinton in 2016.
