= R.R. Virdi =

American author (born 1990)

- Virdi at Dragon Con 2026 in Atlanta, GA
- Born: Ranbir Virdi
- Occupation: Novelist
- Writing career
- Period: December 2013 – present
- Genre: Urban Fantasy
- Notable works: The Grave Report, Books of Winter
- Website: rrvirdi.com

R.R. Virdi is an American urban fantasy author. Two of his novels have been nominated for a Dragon Award: Grave Measures in 2016 and Dangerous Ways in 2017. His novelette, "Messenger" (co-authored with Yudhanjaya Wijeratne), was nominated for a Nebula Award in 2019.

== Career ==
R.R. Virdi's first novel, Grave Beginnings, was published as an ebook in December 2013. It was edited and rereleased in November 2015 in trade paperback format; it was named the "book of the year" by Drop of Ink Review that year. The short work "Chance Fortunes" was published in September 2015 in The Longest Night Watch charity anthology edited by Lacey Sutton. "A Bag Full of Stars" was published in Stardust, Always from Writers Colony Press in June 2016.

In 2016, Grave Measures was nominated for a Dragon Award in the Best Fantasy Novel category. Virdi's short, "Chance Dealings", was released in The Longest Night Watch, Volume 2 in October 2016. Dangerous Ways was released in December and nominated for a 2017 Dragon Award in the Best Fantasy Novel category. The third book in The Grave Report series, Grave Dealings, was released in October 2017.

The first novel in his Monster Slayer Online LitRPG fantasy series, Goblin King, was published in May 2018 as an ebook. "Messenger", a short work co-authored with Yudhanjaya Wijeratne and published in October 2018 in The Expanding Universe Volume 4 military science fiction anthology, was nominated for the Nebula Award for Best Novelette in 2019. In March 2019, Virdi published his space opera novel, Star Shepherd, followed in July by Beast Queen, the sequel to Goblin King.

Virdi published a second story with Wijeratne, "A Little Bit of Kali", in The Expanding Universe Volume 5 in September that year, then co-edited the Parallel Worlds: The Heroes Within anthology with L. J. Hachmeister in October. His story, "The Shadow of Markham", was included in that anthology. Kate Pickford included his story "The Path to Kahinae" in the Hellcats anthology in September 2020.

== Works ==
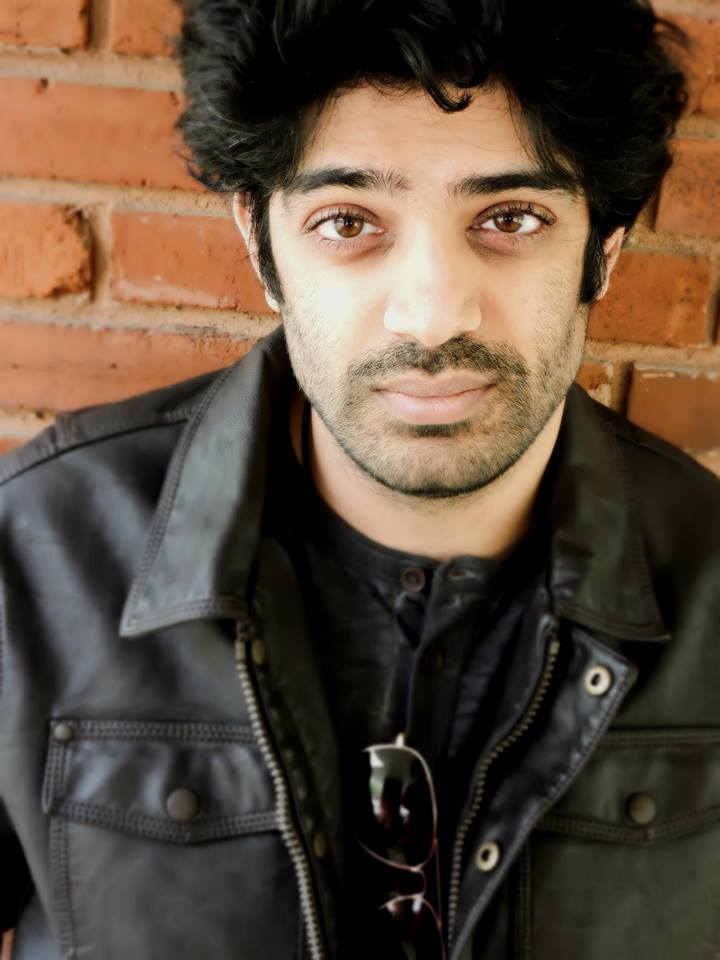

Unless otherwise noted, works are published independently by the author.

=== The Books of Winter ===
An urban fantasy series.

- Dangerous Ways (December 2016, ISBN 978-0-9981049-2-8)

=== The Grave Report ===
An urban fantasy detective series.

1. Grave Beginnings (December 2013 as ebook only, November 2015 in print, ISBN 978-1-5177-9038-7)
2. Grave Measures (April 2016, ISBN 978-1-5308-9486-4)
3. Grave Dealings (October 2017, ISBN 978-1-979302-75-3)

=== Monster Slayer Online ===
Set in a virtual fantasy world.

1. Goblin King (May 2018, ebook)
2. Beast Queen (July 2019, ebook)

=== Shepherd of Light ===
A space opera series.

- Star Shepherd (March 2019, ISBN 978-1-912996-07-0)

=== Tales of Tremaine ===
An epic fantasy series.

- The First Binding (August 2022, Tor Books, ISBN 978-1-250-79617-2)
- The Doors of Midnight (August 2024, Tor Books, ISBN 978-1-250-79618-9)

=== As editor ===
- Parallel Worlds: The Heroes Within with L. J. Hachmeister (October 2019, Source 7, ISBN 978-1-69839-186-1)

=== Short works ===
- "Chance Fortunes" in The Longest Night Watch edited by Lacey Sutton (September 2015, Writers Colony Press, ISBN 978-0-692-53946-0)
- "A Bag Full of Stars" in Stardust, Always edited by Lacey Sutton, Andrew Barber, and Ashlee Hetherington (June 2016, Writers Colony Press, ISBN 978-1-5335-5974-6)
- "Chance Dealings" in The Longest Night Watch, Volume 2 (October 2016, Writers Colony Press, ISBN 978-1-5377-7375-9)
- "Cheaters and Fortunes" in The Longest Night Watch, Volume 2
- "Messenger" with Yudhanjaya Wijeratne in The Expanding Universe Volume 4 edited by (October 2018, LMBPN Publishing, ISBN 978-1-72870-006-9)
- "A Little Bit of Kali" with Yudhanjaya Wijeratne in The Expanding Universe Volume 5 edited by (September 2019, LMBPN Publishing, ISBN 978-1-69185-181-2)
- "The Shadow of Markham" in Parallel Worlds: The Heroes Within edited by R. R. Virdi and L. J. Hachmeister
- "The Path to Kahinae" in Hellcats edited by Kate Pickford (September 2020, ebook only)

== Awards and honors ==
Year	Organization	Award title, Category	Work	Result	Refs
2016	Dragon Con	Dragon Awards, Best Fantasy Novel	Grave Measures	Nominated	
2017	Dragon Con	Dragon Awards, Best Fantasy Novel	Dangerous Ways	Nominated	
2018	SFWA	Nebula Award, Best Novelette	"Messenger" (with Yudhanjaya Wijeratne)	Nominated	
