= E-farsas =

Brazilian fact-checking website

- Website type: Fact-checking
- Available in: Portuguese
- Country of origin: Brazil
- Founder: Gilmar Lopes
- Website: www.e-farsas.com
- Launched: April 1, 2002

E-farsas is a Brazilian fact-checking website founded on April 1, 2002, by systems analyst Gilmar Lopes. Being the first site of its kind in Brazil, its goal is to debunk rumors circulating on the country's social media. The site is a partner of R7, UOL, and the Superior Electoral Court.

== History ==
In an interview with Exame magazine in 2020, Gilmar Lopes reported that he received email chains in 2002. One of them claimed that for every forwarded message, a child would receive 5 or 50 cents, allegedly from an America Online donation. Before forwarding it, he decided to investigate, contacted the company, and confirmed that the information was false. From then on, his friends began challenging him to verify the truthfulness of other emails, and he started compiling these analyses in one place. The E-farsas website was launched on April 1, 2002 (April Fools' Day).

The website collaborated with the program Você é Curioso? on Rádio Bandeirantes, and the site's creator hosted a segment called Verdadeiro ou Farsa ("True or Hoax") on the same radio station, where he answered listeners' questions about news that had spread online during the week. The website also became an interview program on JusTV between 2008 and 2010. In 2019, Gilmar Lopes and the science communicator Pirula launched the segment Fake em Nóis on the MOV.show channel of the video production company MOV from the UOL website.

Starting in 2020, the website established a partnership with the Superior Electoral Court to combat disinformation during Brazilian elections. In 2024, Gilmar Lopes published the book Caçador de Mentiras ("Lies Hunter"). According to the website, the book "talks about the charlatans who make rivers of money from self-help courses and lectures. Self-help, which, by the way, doesn’t 'self-help' anyone, except for the charlatans who only sell self-help courses that teach how to sell courses on how to get rich by selling courses."
