= Sawab (website) =

Lebanese fact-checking platform

- Formation: 2022; 4 years ago
- Official language: Arabic
- Website: sawablb.com

Sawab (Arabic: صواب, lit. 'right') is a fact-checking platform based in Lebanon. It was established in 2022.

== History ==
Sawab was first established as a WhatsApp group in 2022 by six Lebanese journalists to combat disinformation on social media. During the 2023 Turkey–Syria earthquakes, the number of users in the group grew to 2,000 in 4 to 5 months.

Following the 2023 October 7 attacks on Israel, Sawab has fact-checked misinformation in the Gaza war and in the ongoing Hezbollah–Israel conflict, including in the 2026 Lebanon war. Due to an increased demand for fact-checking, Sawab expanded to other social media platforms, and launched a website in 2024.

In December 2024, Sawab won an award from the Arab Fact-Checkers Network (AFCN) for the "Fact-Checking Platforms Collaboration to Counter Mis/Disinformation During the War on Gaza and South Lebanon" project, done in collaboration with Tahaqaq in Palestine and Misbar in Jordan.

Sawab became a signatory of the International Fact-Checking Network (IFCN) in 2026. That June, Sawab fact-checker Alaa Salman died after having been in a coma for a month following an Israeli airstrike on her home; her death was mourned by the IFCN and the AFCN.

== Operation ==
Sawab receives funding from the United Nations Development Program. As of June 2025, Sawab's team consists of 14 part-time members; that month, Sawab introduced an AI chatbot named VERIFAI to assist with fact-checking.
