= Projeto Comprova =

- Available in: Portuguese
- Country of origin: Brazil
- Website: projetocomprova.com.br
- Launched: June 28, 2018

Projeto Comprova is a collaborative effort between several media outlets in Brazil, coordinated by the Brazilian Association of Investigative Journalism, with the aim of verifying the veracity of information published on social media and the internet in general, centralizing fact-checking on its website and unmasking fake news.

In 2020, 28 media outlets were part of the coalition: the newspapers Folha de S.Paulo, O Estado de S. Paulo, Metro, Jornal do Commercio, A Gazeta, Gazeta do Sul, Correio do Povo, Correio da Bahia, Estado de Minas, O Popular, O Povo, Correio do Estado, Correio de Carajás, Diário do Nordeste, the news websites UOL, Poder360, NSC Total (NSC Comunicação), Gaúcha ZH (Grupo RBS), Nexo, Agence France-Presse, the channels Futura, Band, SBT, BandNews, the radio stations BandNews FM and Rádio Bandeirantes, in addition to the magazines Piauí and Exame.

== History ==
In its first phase, the initiative was motivated by the 2018 Brazilian general election. Its objective was to verify statements, speculations and rumors that were circulating on the internet during the election period. In its second phase, which began in July 2019, the focus shifted to analyzing and combating the spread of rumors about public policies related to the federal government. In 2020, the project began a third phase, this time focused on combating misinformation during the COVID-19 pandemic. With the 2020 municipal elections approaching, rumors related to the election or the reliability of the Brazilian electoral system also became the target of fact-checking by the coalition.

In June 2021, the project began its fourth phase, with the entry of six media outlets: the newspapers Correio Braziliense, Tribuna do Norte, O Liberal, the media conglomerate Grupo Sinos, the agency specializing in racial issues Alma Preta and the digital magazine Crusoé.

== See also ==
- First Draft News, a similar project in the United States
- Disinformation
- Fake News
- Misinformation
