= Global Fact-Checking Network =

Fraudulent Russian fact-checking website

- Website type: Fake news website
- Available in: English, Russian
- Founded: November 2024 (organization); 8 April 2025 (active website launched)
- Website: globalfactchecking.com

Global Fact-Checking Network (GFCN) is a Russian state-controlled self-proclaimed international alliance of fact-checkers and media outlets organisation established in November 2024 with an active website since April 2025. GFCN describes itself as a non-profit fact-checking organization, but some sources dispute this, claiming that it spreads Russian propaganda under the guise of fact-checking. It is co-founded by the Autonomous Non-Profit Organization ANO Dialog, the New Media School and TASS.

== History ==
The Global Fact-Checking Network was first presented as an initiative at the "Dialogue about Fakes 2.0" forum in Moscow on 20 November 2024. The following day the spokeswoman for the Ministry of Foreign Affairs of the Russian Federation Maria Zakharova framed the GFCN as a counter to what she called the West's "relentless stream of fake stories and disinformation campaigns," accusing Western fact-checkers of engaging in "biased pseudo-fact-checking" during a press briefing.

The GFCN claims to gather 55 experts from 37 countries, and has written its own "code of responsible fact-checking" listing the norms and principles it believes every fact-checker should follow.

In October 2025 the Global Fact-Check Network became a partner of the International forum "Dialogue about Fakes 3.0" in Moscow. According to the organizers, the forum was attended by 4,000 participants from 80+ countries, including Russian and Venezuelan establishment representatives. Among the prominent speakers at the forum were Maria Zakharova, Russian Foreign Ministry’s official spokesperson, and Freddy Ñáñez, Minister of Information and Communications of the Bolivarian Republic of Venezuela.

== Criticism ==
Despite the fact that GFCN claims to check facts and combat fake news, this organization is only engaged in disseminating Russian propaganda under the guise of fact-checking, since GFCN was co-founded by the Autonomous Non-Profit Organization ANO Dialog, the New Media School and TASS, which are under EU sanctions for spreading disinformation and propaganda in support of the Russian invasion of Ukraine due to them having close ties to the Kremlin. Director of the IFCN Angie Drobnic Holan said that “this is part of a long line of tactics from Russia to imitate independent institutions, but in the service of Russia's political interests”. Independent fact-checkers from Spanish platform Maldita, investigative Italian site Facta, and the fact-checking service of Deutsche Welle highlighted the GFCN's lack of transparency and professional standards. In early August 2025 Pauline Maufrais, the RSF Regional Officer for Ukraine and author of the report on GFCN, told France 24 team that "GFCN is not a structure that operates independently from the rest of the Russian influence network". Moreover, so-called experts who appear on GFCN's site as the authors of articles such as Dutch journalist Sonja van den Ende, regularly share false information online and draw from unverified, unsourced content due to their pro-Russian stance and affiliation with Russian propaganda and disinformation.

In early June 2025 Deutsche Welle reviewed several GFCN articles in which consistent problems with sourcing and methodology were found. An article titled "Is ChatGPT Prone to Russian Propaganda?" does not answer to this question, instead the author Sonja van den Ende defends TASS as an "international news agency with more than 1,700 employees" with "its own office aboard the International Space Station," attacking Norwegian media outlet NRK that questioned the Russian agency's credibility. NewsGuard noted that Russia is not engaging in fact-checking but co-opting the concept of fact checking in order to undermine it. In mid-June 2025 Reporters Without Borders (RSF) analyzed 39 articles, 15 of which primarily served to promote the network and its members, such as their participation in Russian forums rather than fact-checking.

== See also ==
- International Fact-Checking Network
