= Digital News Initiative =

European organisation created by Google

The Digital News Initiative is a European organisation created by Google to "support high-quality journalism through technology and innovation". It encompasses an "Innovation Fund" worth €150m, which in 2018 issued grants to 461 projects at news organisations across Europe. Google has faced skepticism by newsrooms, despite their acceptance of grants and tools as summed up by the 2020 report by Netzpolitik.

== Goals ==
Google describe the goal of the Initiative as "helping journalism thrive in the digital age". The company breaks spending into four areas:

- "Battling misinformation"
- "Telling local stories"
- "Boosting digital revenues"
- "Exploring new technologies"

However, German group Netzpolitik report that Veit Dengler, chairman of the DNI Fund Council, described it as "a PR instrument for Google to win over the European publishing industry".

== Funding recipients ==
The Initiative's fund donates 88% of its dispensations to western Europe, and 54% to organisations founded before 1997. Prospective recipients are required to demonstrate how they create "economic value added for [their] business".

== Proxy lobbying ==
In 2018, while campaigning against the proposed Directive on Copyright in the Digital Single Market, Google encouraged members of the Initiative's working group to lobby their regional MEPs. The private request was revealed by the Financial Times, itself a recipient of grants from the Initiative, and was also published in full by German group Netzpolitik. It begins:

One of the actions from our DNI WG meeting in Lisbon was about more information about the proposed Copyright Directive. Apologies for the delay on my side and the timing is urgent as there is a vote in the Juri committee [linked] of the European Parliament on June 20th on the Copyright directive.

If you feel strongly about this, then please condsider contacting the MEPs [linked] on the Juri committee.

All the best - Madhav

Attached to the letter were a bullet pointed list of Google's opinions on the proposed reforms.

Madhav Chinnappa, author of the email and "Director of News Ecosystem Development" at Google, later stated that the message had been sent in response to a request for comment by members of the working group.

== See also ==
- Google News Lab
