= Ama Llulla =

- Formation: January 17, 2021; 5 years ago
- Type: Nonprofit
- Location: Peru
- Services: Fact-checking
- Official language: Asháninka, Quechuan, Spanish
- Website: ojo-publico.com/autor/red.amallulla

Ama Llulla is a fact-checking network comprising multiple independent journalism organizations that was created to combat disinformation within Peru. The group primarily focuses on verifying information disseminated by political groups and social media while also providing truthful information to indigenous groups in the nation.

== History ==
The term "ama llulla" or "don't lie" is derived from the ethical code "Ama sua, ama llulla, ama quella" or "don't steal, don't lie, don't be lazy" that is popular among Quechuan speaking individuals found in Peru. This term was adopted by the fact-checking organization.

Inspired by other fact-checking groups such as Verificado of Mexico, Reverso of Argentina and Comprobado of Spain, Ama Llulla was created on 17 January 2021 in collaboration with the United Nations Development Program to detect and fact-check disinformation disseminated in the months leading to the 2021 Peruvian general election. The network is made of Peruvian independent journalism websites including OjoPúblico and IDL-Reporteros alongside eight regional radio stations within Peru.

== Services ==
=== Inclusion ===
Information provided by Ama Llulla is presented in Asháninka, Quechuan and Spanish languages. The main target audience are vulnerable populations in Peru, with the network granting indigenous peoples, women and the younger voters both accurate information and increased inclusion in political participation. Programming is also developed based on the location of Ama Llulla's audience; for populations living in remote areas podcasts are recorded to be replayed on local radio stations while those living in urban areas are provided digital audiovisual productions made of videos and illustrations. A virtual newsroom is also hosted by OjoPúblico for journalists from other websites.

=== Social media ===
Disinformation disseminated on social media is targeted for verification by Ama Llulla. According to the network, rapid messages spread through WhatsApp are one of the fastest routes of disinformation in Peru.

=== Workshops ===
In order to establish improved media literacy in Peru, Ama Llulla has collaborated with universities to create workshops to educate the public and students on critical thinking and verification methods that can be utilized when participating in public discourse.

== Support ==
Ama Llulla is partially funded by the Spanish Agency for International Development Cooperation and the United Nations Development Program.

== Controversy ==
The network has been targeted by far-right groups in Peru. Shortly after the Ama Llulla's founding, a far-right group created a fake Facebook page intended to trick readers and promote disinformation. The group targeted President Francisco Sagasti, the Purple Party and the Together for Peru party while it promoted the TV channel Willax Televisión and Manifiesto Perú website.

== See also ==
- FactCheck.org
- List of fact-checking websites
- Snopes
