= Watchdog (research collective) =

Sri Lankan research collective

Watchdog is a Sri Lankan research collective founded in April 2019. It maintains a fact-checking website and makes use of open-source intelligence (OSINT) methods.

== History ==
Watchdog was founded on 23 April 2019, two days after the Easter bombings occurred, by local startup mogul Bhanuka Harischandra, together with Yudhanjaya Wijeratne, Nisal Periyapperuma, Ragulan Ketheeswaran and Safra Anver. Within 36 hours, the team had created a fact-checking app.

Watchdog debunked misinformation that spread in the aftermath of the bombings, including a false claim that the water supply of the Hunipitiya region in Colombo had been poisoned by Muslims. As the amount of misinformation was increasing significantly, Watchdog increased the scale of its operations, with Ketheeswaran recruiting volunteers to translate fact-checks to Sinhala and Tamil. Within 90 days, 25 to 30 volunteers were working for the group. At the time, the website and app had almost 52,000 users.

In January 2020, Anver left the group. In April of that year, during the COVID-19 pandemic, Wijeratne and Periyapperuma, by then the only two remaining members, took a sabbatical from operating Watchdog.

In January 2022, when the economic crisis was starting to have an effect, Watchdog relaunched as an open-source intelligence (OSINT) collective. Wijeratne described the new Watchdog as "a junkyard version of Bellingcat". The Organized Crime and Corruption Reporting Project (OCCRP) provided Watchdog with $340,000 in funding, allowing it to hire full-time staffers. Reuters used Watchdog's data to map the protests taking place across the country, and the Daily Mirror newspaper used its data to counter then-Prime Minister Mahinda Rajapaksa's claims that the unrest was reflective of a minority opinion.

== See also ==
- List of fact-checking websites
