= Fatabyyano =

Jordanian fact-checking platform

- فتبينوا
- Formation: 2014; 12 years ago
- Founder: Moath al-Thaher
- Official language: Arabic, English
- Website: fatabyyano.net

Fatabyyano (Arabic: فتبينوا, lit. 'to investigate') is a fact-checking platform based in Jordan. It was founded in 2014 by Moath al-Thaher.

== History ==
Fatabyyano was established as a Facebook page in 2014 by Moath al-Thaher, a medical student. Its initial focus was on health misinformation. Al-Thaher was inspired to start Fatabyyano following the death of his cousin, who died a few months after stopping her chemotherapy treatment for skin cancer when she heard about a herb from Lebanon that was claimed to cure skin cancer. "Fatabyyano" is a holy command from the Quran that means "to investigate".

In 2016, Harvard University invited Fatabyyano to its annual conference as one of the best projects for that year in the Arab world. The next year, Fatabyyano was named one of the most creative youth projects in 2016 by Queen Rania of Jordan.

By 2019, Fatabyyano had expanded to fact-checking misinformation in the Arab world, including 22 countries in the Middle East and North Africa (MENA) region. In 2020, it partnered with Meta Platforms for its Arabic-language fact-checking program in the MENA region and with the French Media Development Agency to produce content combating COVID-19 misinformation.

Fatabyyano has fact-checked misinformation in the Gaza war. It partnered with TikTok to fact-check Middle East content in October 2023.

== Operation ==
Fatabyyano has received sponsorships from the Applied Science Private University and the Zedni Education Network. As of 2019, it was struggling to secure funding for its operations. That year, it was first certified as a fact-checker by the International Fact-Checking Network (IFCN); its certification has not been renewed since 2024.

As of 2025, Fatabyyano is developing TrendCheck.AI, an AI-powered tool which aims to keep up with the high quantity and quality of AI-generated disinformation. The model has been trained on fact-checking data provided by the Fatabyyano team. In 2024, Fatabyyano was awarded a grant from the IFCN for TrendCheck.AI.
