= Gomaneh =

Online Perasian Magazine

Gomaneh گمانه
- Website type: Fact checking
- Available in: Persian
- Website: gomaneh.net
- Commercial: No

Gomaneh (Persian: گمانه), or "Center of Fighting Humbug" (Persian: ستاد مبارزه با چرندیات), is an online Persian magazine devoted to the investigation of rumours and hearsay. It examines rumours and false news rampant on the Internet and social networks through its various platforms: its mobile app, website, Facebook page and social network. It won The BOBs award in 2015.

The organizers also maintain a website named Gomaneh which is part of their efforts to promote transparency and fight against rumours in the context of social networks. Their motto is "The human brain is endowed with the power of analysis; let’s make use of it."

According to Persian Deutsche Welle, the only objective of this web page is to combat the spread of rumours and lies in Persian websites.

Gomaneh was banned by the Iranian government on 12 January 2016. Before that, the government had sporadically restricted access to some of its content such as the article "Refuting the Scientific Benefits of Fasting".
