= Google News Lab =

Google initiative for journalists

The Google News Lab (since 2018 part of the Google News Initiative) is a global team at Google whose mission is to “collaborate with journalists and entrepreneurs to help build the future of media”. Launched in 2015, the team works with news organizations to help address industry challenges by providing training and access to emerging technologies for reporting and storytelling.

The Google News Lab was added to the Google News Initiative when it launched in 2018.

== Impact ==
=== Combating misinformation ===
Google News Lab was a founding partner of the fact-checking coalition First Draft, which launched in 2015. In 2017, Google helped First Draft launch new collaborative reporting models to verify news stories during the UK, French and German elections.

The News Lab also provides free training for journalists in how to "discover and debunk false news and misinformation," both in-person and on its training website.

As part of its Digital News Initiative, Google has introduced the Journalist Studio with tools such as Pinpoint, an AI-based tool built to help journalists find and verify stories, and The Common Knowledge Project, a way for journalists to explore, visualize and share data about important issues in their communities.

=== Newsroom diversity ===
In 2017, the Google News Lab partnered with the American Society of News Editors (ASNE) on its annual Newsroom Employment Diversity Survey. The survey showed how hundreds of newsrooms across the U.S. had changed since 2001. It also compared newsroom diversity counts to census data to show how newsrooms compare to their local area in terms of race and gender.

=== Local news ===
The News Lab has trained more than 9,000 local reporters in the U.S. through a partnership with the Society for Professional Journalists. Training programs for local newsrooms also exist in Europe, the Asia Pacific, Latin America, the Middle East, and Africa.

== Criticism ==
The Google News Lab and Google's Digital News Initiative have been criticized as buy-offs of the newsrooms after its advertising monopoly led to countless layoffs in newsrooms.

== See also ==
- Digital News Initiative, Google's fund for European newsrooms
