= First Draft News =

Project to fight misinformation

First Draft
- Formation: June 2015; 11 years ago
- Dissolved: June 2022; 4 years ago
- Legal status: Foundation
- Headquarters: London
- Website: firstdraftnews.org

First Draft News was a project "to fight mis- and disinformation online" founded in 2015 by nine organizations brought together by the Google News Lab. It included Facebook, Twitter, the Open Society Foundations and several philanthropic organizations. (Note: The philanthropies include the John S. and James L. Knight Foundation, the Ford Foundation, and Craig Newmark Philanthropies.) In June 2022, First Draft announced it would be shutting down, with its mission continuing at the Information Futures Lab.

== Project description ==
The project drew on experts and organisations working in the field, including reported.ly, Eyewitness Media Hub, Storyful and Meedan. Google News Lab developed and maintained firstdraftnews.org and supported the creation of new content.

In September 2016, First Draft began coordinating "efforts between newsrooms, fact-checking organizations, and academic institutions to combat mis- and disinformation". Coalition members published how-to guides addressing topics such as ethics surrounding "use of eyewitness media" and how to "spot fake footage and hoaxes".

Newsrooms participating in First Draft's CrossCheck project "cross-checked" each other, debunked stories, and developed methods to hinder "the spread of misleading and fabricated content" for the 2017 French, UK, and German elections. Claire Wardle, First Draft’s executive director, has stated: “With elections being a prime target for agents who create and spread disinformation, partnering with a research center that focuses on the intersection of media, politics and technology is a natural fit.”

In October 2017, First Draft moved to the Shorenstein Center on Media, Politics and Public Policy, part of the John F. Kennedy School of Government at Harvard University.

In February 2019, it was reported that First Draft had left Harvard due to a "series of miscommunications". In June 2019, First Draft participated in a Trusted News Conference convened by the BBC in response to alleged systemic disinformation during the 2019 Indian general election. First Draft was a founding member of the Trusted News Initiative, which subsequently launched in September 2019.

In June 2022, the First Draft mission moved to the Information Futures Lab at the Brown University School of Public Health. The First Draft website was archived and "hosted in perpetuity" by the Internet Archive, with which it had partnered since 2017.

== See also ==
- Projeto Comprova, a similar project in Brazil
- Disinformation
- Fake News
- Misinformation
