= Arab Reporters for Investigative Journalism =

Academic, training and research organisation from Jordan

Arab Reporters for Investigative Journalism (ARIJ) is a non-profit journalism organisation based in Jordan. It was founded in 2005.

== History ==
ARIJ was founded in Amman, Jordan by Rana Sabbagh in 2005. Its goal is to promote investigative journalism in the MENA region. ARIJ holds an annual forum on developments in journalism, with a different theme every year.

In 2014, Sabbagh joined the board of directors of the Global Investigative Journalism Network (GIJN). In 2018, ARIJ was awarded the Raif Badawi Award for courageous reporting.

ARIJ has been certified as a fact-checker by the International Fact Checking Network (IFCN).

== Notable coverage ==
ARIJ assisted German newspaper Süddeutsche Zeitung in its reporting on the Panama Papers.

ARIJ has reported on the killing of journalists by Israel in the Gaza war, in collaboration with Forbidden Stories and other news organisations. In 2025, ARIJ, The Guardian, Der Spiegel, Paper Trail Media and ZDF collaborated on an investigation into the killing of the Doghmush clan. Following the report's publication, the European Center for Constitutional and Human Rights (ECCHR) filed a criminal complaint against a German-Israeli soldier accused of killing unarmed Palestinians.

== Arab Fact-Checkers Network ==
The Arab Fact-Checkers Network (AFCN) is a network aimed at improving fact-checking in the Arab world. It was established by ARIJ in 2020. It trains media outlets on conducting in-house fact-checking. As of 2026, the AFCN included over 35 member organisations in the Arab world.

Following the 2023 October 7 attacks on Israel, AFCN investigative reporter and manager Saja Mortada and her colleagues established an emergency response system to debunk misinformation in the subsequent Gaza war. As of November 2023, the AFCN's members included almost 20 fact-checkers from Arab countries, including Algeria, Iraq, Libya, Lebanon, Palestine, Sudan and Yemen.

From 2023 to 2025, the AFCN partnered with Full Fact, a British fact-checking organisation. The partnership focused on developing Full Fact's Arabic-language AI tools and testing whether they would be useful in improving the efficiency of the fact-checking process.
