= Gun laws in Poland =

Active permits and registered firearms in Poland by year (in thousands). (Note: Excluding gas guns.) Source: KGP

Polish law allows modern firearms ownership on a general shall-issue basis under police-issued permit for people who provide an important reason. Hunting, sport shooting, training and collecting are the most popular reasons and require membership in suitable organizations. Self-defense permits for civilians are chief exceptions to the rule, where a may-issue based permit is required. Antique black powder firearms or their replicas and most air guns are available without a permit. Firearm owners are subject to physical and mental health evaluations and domestic violence confiscation laws resembling U.S. red flag laws.

With approximately 2.5 civilian firearms per 100 people, Poland is the 167th most armed country in the world. Less than 0.8% of citizens have valid firearm permits. (Note: The published number of active firearms permits is larger than the number of people owning guns, as one person can hold multiple permits for different purposes. It is therefore hard to determine the actual number of gun owners in Poland.)

== History ==
=== Second Polish Republic ===
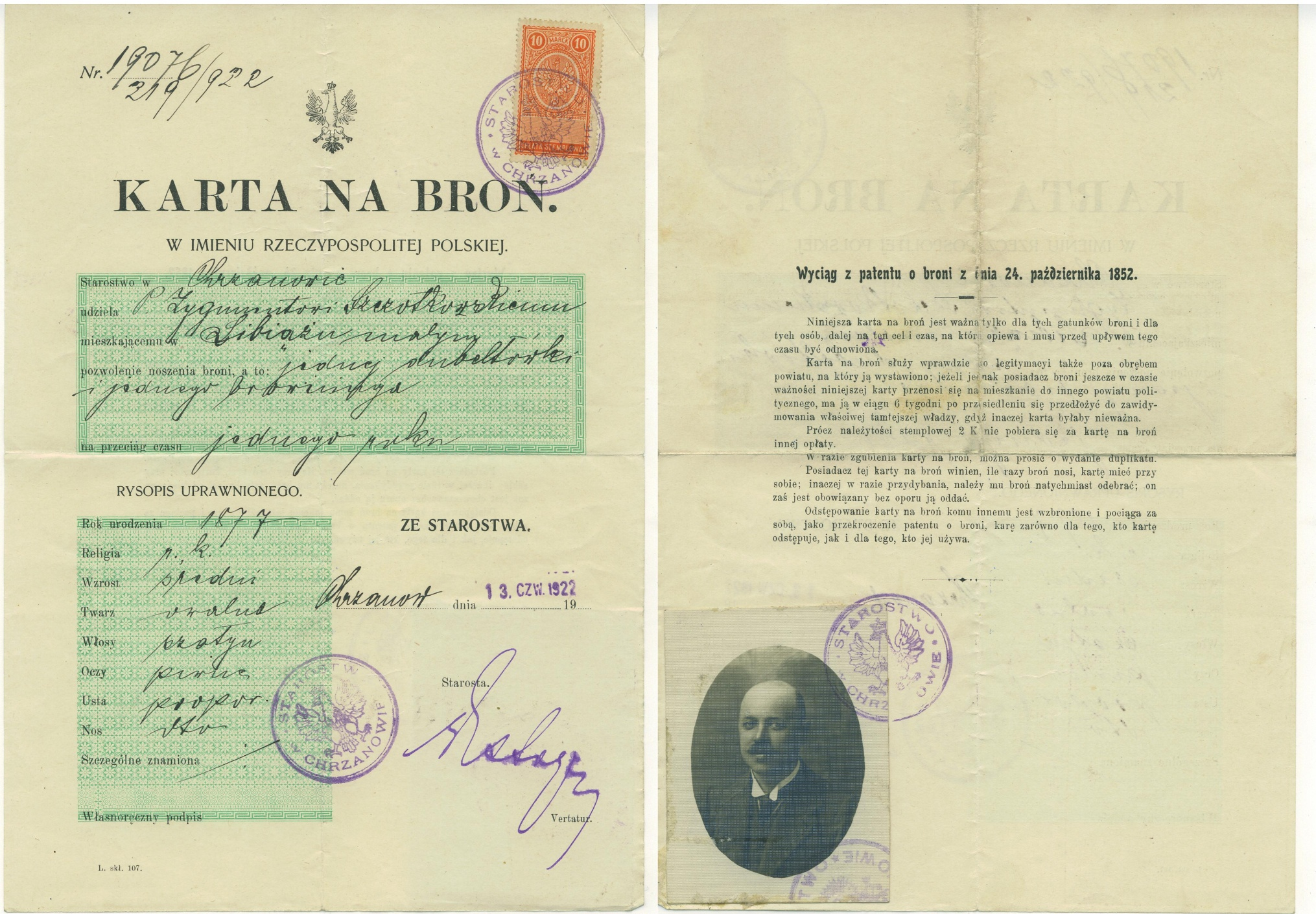
Polish firearm permit from 1922

On 25 January 1919 Józef Piłsudski acting as the Head of state of the newly re-established Poland, issued a decree that become the first Polish law dealing with firearm ownership, however laws enacted previously during Partitions of Poland were still in power in some parts of the country till 1932. In particular, the firearm permit of 1922 presented in the picture was issued under the regulations of Austrian Emperor-King's Patent of 24 November 1852. The January 1919 decree stated that civilians needed government permit to purchase and own (long) firearms for hunting or handguns for self defense purposes. Related executive order of 1919 issued by the minister of internal affairs assigned the authority for issuing permits to the Polish State Police. Another order of 1920 moved the authority to local civil administration and prescribed that permits for self defense shall be issued "only when necessary". The law didn't state any specific conditions needed to obtain firearms, so in practice the authorities had full discretion. Possession of military-type firearms was prohibited. Unauthorized possession carried a punishment of up to three months of jail or a fine of no more than 3000 Polish marka, or up to one year or up to 5000 Polish marka in case of (not specified further) military weapons.

The above decree was superseded on 27 October 1932 by a more comprehensive executive order of the president of Republic of Poland, which regulated trade, possession, import, export and transport of weapons, ammunition and explosives. It established permits for possession of firearms at home and for carrying firearms in the public, both issued for a maximum period of three years. A separate permit for collecting guns for historical, scientific or memorial purposes, issued for an indefinite period, did not allow the owner of such collection to buy ammunition or gunpowder. Permits were granted by local authorities at the county level. The prohibited persons were minors below 17 years, persons with mental illnesses or addicted to alcohol or drugs, vagabonds, or people who were indicted twice for the same infraction against gun law. Otherwise, the authorities had full discretion, including assessment if the applicant does not pose a threat to the government or public safety and order. There were also institutional permits intended for government institutions, businesses, paramilitary organizations etc. Possession of military-type firearms (artillery pieces, full-auto pistols and rifles, semi-auto and repeating rifles that were in regular use by the military) was prohibited. Historical firearms produced before 1850 and air guns up to 6 mm bore were unrestricted. Unauthorized possession of military-type firearms was punishable by up to 3 years of prison; for other guns, up to six months of jail or fine up to 5000 Polish złoty.

=== Nazi-Soviet Occupation ===
During the Nazi-Soviet occupation (1939–1945) civilians were banned from owning firearms or military equipment. Under the German occupational rule, those breaking the gun ban were subject to capital punishment, as well as those who failed to inform the authorities about illegal gun possession. There was a prize of up to 1000 złoty set for denunciating a gun possessor or gun cache. In 1939 Polish historian and writer Rafał Marceli Blüth along with 15 people was executed for illegal possession of a gas mask.

Under the Soviet occupation, initially the military administration strived to confiscate all weapons, but later the Soviet Union laws were applied, such as the Russian SFSR criminal law of 1926. Distinct Byelorussian SSR or Ukrainian SSR criminal laws were applied on parts of the territory annexed to those constituent republics. In general, only handguns and rifles were banned; illegal possession was punished by jail of up to 5 years. Shotguns were traditionally allowed in Soviet Russia as hunting weapons, permits being issued by local administration. Illegal possession of a shotgun was treated as a misdemeanor and punished by a confiscation and fine. However, in the occupied Polish territory illegal possession of guns was treated unevenly; often the authorities tried to attribute a more serious crime, such as treason, armed counter-revolutionary activity etc., which were punishable by death or long labor camp sentences.

=== Polish People's Republic ===
After the war, in the Polish People's Republic, the executive order of 1932 was considered binding, until a new law was enacted in 1961. During that time several amendments or other laws, as well as actual practice, severely restricted gun possession by civilians, practically limiting it to government officials, important political figures and people loyal to the ruling party. Just over a month after the end of the World War II the minister of public security Stanisław Radkiewicz issued a regulation which invalidated all firearm permits as of 15 July 1945 and ordered all permit holders to acquire new ones or deposit their guns and permits at the local branch of the Ministry of Public Security. However, the regulation mentioned only public administration employees as the prospective permit holders, requiring among other documentation a statement from the highest official in the voivodeship certifying that the applicant has a necessity to have a gun. The regulation was replaced in 1946 by a more comprehensive one, which also covered hunters and members of officially appointed shooting associations, but drastically shortened validity periods of the permits to six months for hunting and sport firearms and three months for other firearms. The authorities had full discretion in granting and revoking permits. The punishments for illegal possession were severe: a decree of 13 June 1946 stated that unauthorized possession of firearms, ammunition or explosives was punishable by at least 5 years of prison, life imprisonment or capital punishment. In 1955 the administrative responsibility for firearm permits were transferred to the Citizens' Militia. A regulation of 16 January 1958 restricted air guns, subjecting them to the same regulations as firearms.

On 31 January 1961 a new Act of Law superseded the pre-war Executive Order. The administrative responsibility for firearms permits had been assigned to the appropriate branches of Citizens' Militia at either the voivodeship or county level, as amended according to several changes in administrative division of Polish People's Republic that happened during the period of validity of this Act. In 1975 the responsibility for issuing permits for air guns was transferred to local (city or district) stations. The Militia had full discretion in deciding if "the factual circumstances justify the issuing of a permit", and could withdraw the permit if the circumstances ceased to exist. The Militia could refrain from providing any justification of refusal or withdrawal of a permit, based on "security of the State or public order interest". The permit also prescribed if the owner was allowed to carry the firearm or only to keep it at specified locations. Permits were issued for up to one year (later amended to up to 3 years) for handguns and military-type firearms, or for up to 5 years for hunting and sport firearms. In 1986 the administrative responsibility regarding firearms permits was moved to the local or voivodeship branches of the Security Service, and in 1990 to the newly formed Police. In 1994 the permits validity periods were abolished, making them valid indefinitely until revoked by administrative action.

The law of 1961, originally covering only firearms (loosely defined as "short firearms or hunting and sport firearms") but excluding firearms manufactured before 1850, was extended in 1986 to also cover less-lethal firearms: gas guns, alarm guns (Note: Devices emitting only sound and gases but no projectile, such as starting pistols, blank-firing prop guns and similar objects are regarded as alarm guns from their intended use of making a gunshot sound in order to alarm nearby people or scare an attacker. They are also used sometimes to make noise during celebrations such as New Year's, or – rarely – to propel fireworks. Legal definition of an alarm gun was added to the Weapons and Munitions Act only in the 2004 amendment. Note that alarm guns less than 6 mm in caliber are unrestricted.) and flare guns, and in 1990 to further cover electroshock weapons, crossbows, hidden blades, elastic batons with hard endings or implements, nunchakus and brass knuckles, while deregulating possession of alarm guns up to 6 mm in caliber. The latter provisions survived to this day.

The permits were not to be issued to people under 18 years old (however sport firearms could be issued to people over 16), mentally ill, known as being addicted to drugs or alcohol, people not having an officially registered address of permanent residence or official source of income, or people who in the opinion of the Militia could use guns "contrary to the interests of state security or public order". The Militia was obligated to withdraw the permit if it later determined that a permit holder belongs to one of the mentioned groups. The issuing authority "could check if the applicant is familiar with gun laws", but no official exam was mandated. Carrying loaded guns in public transport was prohibited. Minister of Internal Affairs could enact temporary ban on firearms and order to place all private guns in Militia's deposit. Such a ban was introduced just before declaring Martial law in Poland in 1981.

Illegal manufacturing, possession, sale or transfer of air guns, as well as other minor infractions such as carrying against the permit terms or other regulations, failure to inform of a change of the place of residence etc. were punishable of up to three months of jail or a fine of up to 4,500 Polish złoty. Illegal sale or transfer of firearms, ammunition or explosives carried a punishment of up to 3 years of prison.

=== Modern times ===
The current state of the law is described in the main section of this article. Here the initial text and history of major amendments are briefly described.

In 1999 a new Act of Law superseded the gun law of 1961. The overall reach of the new regulation was largely the same as the old one, but also included many new restrictions while dropping or limiting a few others. Major differences were:

- broad legal definitions of a firearm and an air gun have been introduced, covering also improvised devices;
- restricted weapons catalog was extended to cover tear gas dispensers (except handheld ones) and "clubs made of wood or other heavy and hard material imitating a baseball bat";
- a list of purposes for possession of guns were introduced, initially containing self-defense or protection of persons and property, hunting, sport shooting, collecting, memorial and training purposes (see also table below);
- age limit was increased to 21 years (18 years for sport firearms on special recommendation by a school or a sport or paramilitary association);
- prohibited persons list was extended besides mentally ill (as defined in appropriate laws) also to persons having significant psychological disorders or significant physical disabilities, while the requirement to have an official source of income was dropped;
- prohibited persons who "could use guns contrary to the interests of state security or public order" were to include, in particular, persons convicted or charged of a violent crime;
- mandatory medical and psychological evaluations by government-approved practitioners were introduced, to be repeated every five years;
- official exams administered by the Police or hunting or sport associations were mandated;
- "especially dangerous" weapons and ammunition were banned, including full-auto firearms, guns disguised as other items, guns equipped with sound suppressors or adapted to firing using a suppressor, guns equipped with laser pointers or night vision devices and guns that could not be detected by typical personnel or luggage scanners;
- detailed specification of what kinds of guns are allowed for specified purposes was defined, in the area of sport weapons basically recanting ISSF competition rules;
- storage requirements for guns and ammunition were defined.

Administrative responsibility for issuing permits remained with the Police, at the county level for melee weapons, (large) tear gas dispensers and gas guns or at the voivodeship level for other firearms. The Police had full discretion to decide "if the circumstances invoked by the applicant justify issuance of the permit", how many guns the applicant can possess, and to limit or forbid carrying of guns in public. The Police could refuse (re)issuance of the permit if the applicant previously committed an offence against gun carrying, registration or storage regulations, as well as obligations to notify the Police about a loss of a firearm or change of place of residence. The Police was obliged to withdraw the permit in case the permit holder became a prohibited person, carried a gun against the regulations or while intoxicated, or failed to notify promptly of a loss of a gun, and could refuse if the circumstances invoked in the application ceased to exist, the permit holder committed an offence against regulations regarding gun registration, storage or movement across borders, periodic medical and psychological evaluations, notification of change of address, lent a gun to an unlicensed person, or fired a gun outside of a shooting range. The permits had indefinite validity. Historical guns produced before 1850 and alarm guns up to 6 mm remained unrestricted. Smooth-bore air guns became unrestricted as a result of the newly introduced definition of an air gun.

The new law introduced separate institutional permits intended for private security businesses, shooting ranges, sport clubs, schools, etc. allowing them to buy firearms and ammunition, and related gun handling permits for employees of such businesses, authorizing them to carry and use company guns.

Minister of Internal Affairs could enact a temporary ban on carrying loaded or unloaded guns or both, in the whole country or in designated areas.

Additionally, the act regulated private shooting ranges: established environmental and zoning regulations and mandated range safety rules to be implemented by range owners and to be officially accepted by local authorities, including the obligation to record names and addresses or gun permit numbers of all patrons.

==== Major amendments ====
===== 2004 =====
Less powerful air guns and replicas of pre-1850 guns were allowed without permit or registration. More powerful air guns did not require a permit since then, but were made available only for people over 18 with no criminal record which had undergone medical and psychological evaluation, and had to be registered with the Police. Officially deactivated guns were allowed without a permit for persons over 18, but had to be registered with the Police. Periodic medical and psychological re-evaluation was abolished except for holders of self defense permits.

- Regulations regarding deactivated guns were introduced.
- Definitions of a flare gun and an alarm gun were added to clarify what guns are allowed to be used without a permit.
- Definition of an air gun was amended to include only guns that eject projectiles with muzzle energy greater than 17 joules.
- Registration of deactivated guns and more powerful air guns was mandated.
- Carrying was defined as any movement of a gun, regardless of its loaded or unloaded state.
- The provision allowing unlicensed possession of pre-1850 guns was extended to also cover modern replicas.
- The list of guns not requiring a permit was extended to cover air guns and deactivated guns.
- Gun registration regulations were updated to explicitly exclude unlicensed guns and define regulations for more powerful air guns and deactivated guns.
- Prohibited persons provisions were extended to cover also people convicted or charged of non-violent crime, also including property crime.
- Persons over 18 were allowed to acquire permit for hunting purposes, on special recommendation of Polish Hunting Federation.
- Requirement for periodic medical and psychological re-evaluation was amended to cover only holders of self defense permits.

===== 2011 =====
Licensing procedures changed to shall-issue on condition of not being a threat to oneself or public order and having an important reason. Types of allowed firearms and their calibers were extended. Members of historical societies engaging in re-enactments were allowed to have blank-firing guns, including full-auto ones. Replicas of pre-1885 guns not using pre-assembled ammunition were allowed without permit. Movement of unloaded guns was unrestricted. Use of laser pointers and night-vision devices was allowed. Online gun trade was allowed.

- Legal definition of a firearm was broadened again to include objects that "can be adapted to ejecting a projectile".
- Permit issuance procedures were thoroughly rewritten:
  - the condition for issuing a permit was changed from vague to specific, namely not posing a threat to oneself or public safety and order, and showing an important reason for possessing a firearm;
  - particular important reasons were defined for each purpose of possession of a gun;
  - the list of purposes was extended to add historical re-enactments; self-defense and protection of persons and property purpose was divided into two separate ones;
  - kinds of guns allowed for each purpose were defined in the Act itself (instead of being delegated to a ministerial regulation); the specification was simplified and broadened;
  - kinds of "especially dangerous" guns were defined in the Act itself and modified to exclude blank-firing full-auto guns; laser pointers and night vision devices were dropped from the list;
  - carrying was defined as moving a loaded gun, therefore completely unrestricting movement of unloaded guns by their legal owners; carrying loaded has been made illegal for collecting and memorial permit holders.
- List of guns not requiring a permit was rewritten, also to include replicas of pre-1885 guns which do not use pre-assembled ammunition.
- Remote ordering and sale (e.g. via phone, Internet, etc.) was allowed and specific regulations were defined. (Note: The ministerial regulations regarding shipping of guns via public carriers are so demanding, that no public carrier – neither Polish Post nor commercial carriers, even huge international ones – offer gun shipping services within Poland. Online gun sale is therefore limited to placing orders and processing payments only, the transaction has to be finalized in-person. Interestingly, licensed gun dealers have very few restrictions in moving guns in the course of their business, so some dealers offer shop-to-door delivery of their own stock or act as intermediaries between another dealer and the client.)
- The prohibited persons provisions were broadened to cover people convicted of any intentional crime (also a non-violent one) or intentional tax crime, or unintentional crime against life or health, or an unintentional crime against road safety while intoxicated; the provisions forbidding people charged but not yet convicted of a crime to get or keep a permit were dropped as unconstitutional, however in case a person has been charged of said crimes, the Police were allowed to take the person's guns and documentation into its deposit until the case is finally decided, but no longer than for 3 years.

===== 2014 =====
Holders of sport shooting permits were allowed to carry their weapons concealed.

===== 2018 =====
Holders of hunting permits, who since 2004 did not have to undergo periodic (every five years) medical and psychological re-evaluations were subjected again to these evaluations; the first such evaluations to be performed in 2023, five years since enactment of this amendment.

===== 2020 =====
Hunting with suppressors was allowed, solely for sanitary shooting of animals.

===== 2023 =====
Obligatory seizure of guns, ammunition and supporting documentation in case of accusation or suspicion of domestic violence has been introduced.

The obligation to re-take medical and psychological evaluations by holders of hunting permits, coming into effect this year, has been abolished, nullifying the 2018 amendment.

Officers of the Police and other armed governmental agencies, professional soldiers having a service weapon assigned and soldiers of the Territorial Defense Force serving for at least two years can now easily obtain permits for self defense or protection of persons and property purposes, once they declare "willingness to strengthen the defense potential of the Republic of Poland".

On April 14, an amendment was enacted, which stated that persons who were found to be "under Russian influence" by the newly established State Commission for investigating Russian influence on internal security of the Republic of Poland in the years 2007–2022, may have their guns permit withdrawn or may be prevented from obtaining a permit for 10 years. On June 16, the aforementioned provisions were struck out by another amendment.

== Current law ==
Civilian firearms ownership, usage and private trade in Poland is regulated by the Weapons and Munitions Act of 21 May 1999, as further amended, which states that acquisition, possession and sale or other disposal of weapons and ammunition is generally prohibited, unless specifically authorized by this Act, and requires a permit or other official authorization to own or possess firearms, ammunition and some other weapons. The act does not apply to the armed forces and various governmental law enforcement agencies, and to professional arms trade, which are regulated separately.

The act prescribes various conditions and requirements regarding ownership and usage of firearms by both citizens and foreigners, administrative procedures for issuing and revoking authorizations and for registration of firearms, rules for moving guns across borders by individuals, and basic regulations concerning shooting ranges. It also contains several penal provisions.

=== Procedures and permits ===
The civilians' permits for firearms are issued by the voivodeship commander of the Police, via his office's administrative division. For other weapons the competency lies with the county commander. Soldiers get their permits (for privately owned guns) from the appropriate commander of the Military Police. The procedures are performed under the framework of the administrative law; disputes are handled by administrative courts.

==== General procedures ====
The application for a permit needs to specify the purpose of ownership of guns and must be accompanied with relevant documentation establishing "important reason" for possession as appropriate for the purpose, results of medical and psychological evaluations (unless exempted) and proof of payment of administrative fees. The Police evaluates provided documentation and reasoning contained in the application, and verifies if the applicant is a trustworthy person, by checking the Polish Criminal Record and Police's own much more extensive records, as well as performing a social interview of the applicant. If not exempt, or having already passed an exam before hunting or sport association, the applicant has to pass an exam before the Police. After administering the exam and completing internal evaluation the Police issues a written decision. The administrative decision granting a permit contains the purpose for which the permit was applied for, the categories of allowed guns according to the regulations regarding particular purpose, and the number of guns allowed to possess (discretionary). The decision declining a permit must contain a justification and specification of the legal basis for refusal, and can be challenged according to the procedures of administrative law.

Permits are issued for an indefinite period, subject to future obligatory withdrawal if specific conditions are met, such as when the holder becomes a prohibited person, commits specific crimes, handles a gun under influence of alcohol, or fails to notify about a loss of a firearm. The Police may also withdraw the permit, at its discretion, when the permit holder fails to fulfill some administrative obligations like registering a gun, notifying about the change of address, missing periodic medical check-up, violating storage requirements, firing a gun outside a shooting range etc., or when the "important reason" for ownership of guns ceases to exist. Withdrawals are processed according to administrative law and can be challenged accordingly. The owner who had the permit withdrawn is obliged to sell or otherwise dispose of guns within 30 days, or alternatively place them in the Police deposit for a fee. In emergencies the Police can seize the guns and place them in its deposit immediately.

Gun permits formally take the form of a written decision on official letterhead; however, they are accompanied with an identification document in a booklet form, which contains permit holder's photo and personal data, and records guns registered to the holder. This document is needed to legally carry guns and to purchase ammunition for the guns in possession.

==== Common conditions ====
To obtain a firearms permit, the applicant has to:

- be at least 21 years old (or 18 in case of sport or hunting permit on special recommendation by sport or hunting association);
- be a permanent resident of Poland (regardless of citizenship);
- pass medical evaluation, including ophthalmological, psychiatric and possibly other examinations as needed, and psychological evaluation, by practitioners specifically appointed for that function by the Police, certifying that the applicant has no mental disorders, significant psychophysical disabilities or significant psychological dysfunctions and is not addicted to alcohol or other psychoactive substances (soldiers, law enforcement officers and licensed private security guards are exempt);
- in the opinion of the Police, does not present a threat to oneself or public security and order, including, but not limited to:
  - not being convicted of any intentional felony (even a non-violent one), intentional tax felony, unintentional felony against life or health of another person, and unintentional traffic felony committed under influence of alcohol or other substance or when the applicant fled the place of the accident,
  - getting positive opinion of a local district officer, in most cases involving an interview of the applicant and optionally applicant's family or neighbors;
- pass an exam appropriate for the purpose of possession of a firearm (soldiers and law enforcement officers are exempt):
  - held by the Polish Sport Shooting Federation for a sport permit (or other permits limited to sport weapons),
  - held by the Polish Hunting Association for a hunting permit (or other permits limited to hunting weapons),
  - held by the Police for other types of permits;
- provide appropriate documentation (such as hunting, sport, historical or collectors' association membership, sport or hunting license, business registration etc.);
- pay appropriate administrative fees.

The permit holder has to possess a certified gun safe before acquiring the first gun. To buy guns one needs to request certifications for buying guns of type and quantity according to the permit terms. These certifications have to be handed to the person or business transferring gun(s) to the new owner. Acquired guns have to be registered with the Police and recorded in the gun owner's identification document within 5 working days. The business or person selling or otherwise transferring a gun to a new owner is obligated to verify the new owner's permit and notify the Police of the transaction, including providing the certification received from the new owner.

All legal owners are allowed to use their guns at registered shooting ranges. Discharging a firearm for training or leisure out of a registered shooting range (even on a large private property) is prohibited.

==== Medical and psychological evaluations ====
Medical and psychological evaluations are to be conducted by practitioners who have passed an official training regarding legal regulations and methods of performing such evaluations, and are enlisted in the official register of authorized practitioners by the voivodeship commanders of the Police. The results of the evaluations (either positive or negative) can be challenged by both the applicant and the Police; in such case the evaluations are to be repeated before governmental health centers or research institutes specializing in occupational medicine (till 28 July 2023) or before another authorized practitioner selected by the challenging party (since 28 July 2023, according to a recent amendment). The latter evaluations are final and not challengeable before administrative courts.

==== Individuals' permits ====
The wording of the law ("Police issues weapons permit") comes to the effect that permits are issued on an obligatory basis, however on the condition that the applicant "does not pose a threat to oneself or public order and safety, and provides an important reason for owning weapons". The Act lists particular purposes (also known as permit types), important reasons entitling to possession, and categories of guns and other restricted devices allowed for each purpose. Therefore, once the reason is clearly established and general restrictions are met, the Police has very little to say and the permits are issued almost automatically (shall issue system); however the condition (important reason) for self-defense and protection of persons and property permits (as issued for a regular citizen) is vague enough and hard to prove beyond doubt to make these types of permits discretionary in practice (may issue system).

Purpose	Important reason	Allowed guns
Self-defence	Constant, real and higher than average threat to life, health or property (may-issue). Willingness to strengthen the defense potential of the Republic of Poland declared by an officer of the Police or other armed governmental agency, professional soldier of the Armed Forces having assigned a service weapon, or Territorial Defense Force soldier serving for at least two years (shall-issue).	Centerfire pistols and revolvers 6 to 12 mm in caliber including gas guns and alarm guns, electroshock weapons with mean current exceeding 10 mA, incapacitating gas dispensers (non-handheld).
Protection of persons and property (Note: No permit of this type has been issued in the years 2015–2021, according to police statistics. In 2022 one permit was issued. Since 2023, according to the amendment which allowed military or law enforcement officers to obtain this kind of permit easily, 1543 new permits were issued.)	Constant, real and higher than average threat to life, health or property (may-issue). Willingness to strengthen the defense potential of the Republic of Poland declared by an officer of the Police or other armed governmental agency, professional soldier of the Armed Forces having assigned a service weapon, or Territorial Defense Force soldier serving for at least two years (shall-issue).	Same as above, plus flare guns, submachine guns 6 to 12 mm in caliber, 12-gauge non-auto shotguns, centerfire rifles 5.45 to 7.62 mm in caliber.
Hunting	Authorization for hunting, as determined by hunting laws.	Hunting shotguns and rifles, as prescribed in hunting laws. (Note: Ministerial regulation regarding hunting allows only centerfire long guns (shotguns or rifles; pistols and revolvers are specifically forbidden) with maximum capacity of six rounds. Rifles shall have caliber greater than 5.6 mm and use high-performance ammunition that retain over 1000 J of kinetic energy at 100 m from the muzzle. However, for hunting moose the energy at 100 m shall exceed 2500 J and for red deer, fallow deer, mouflon or wild boar (except piglets), 2000 J. Red deer (except bucks), fallow deer, roe deer, mouflon and wild boar can be hunted with shotguns using slugs only, provided that energy requirement is met (using buckshot is illegal). Small game, except predators, can only be hunted using shot of up to 4.5 mm diameter. Predators, namely fox, badger, marten, polecat, racoon dog, American raccoon and American mink (the last two being invasive species), can be hunted using both rifles (with JHP or FMJ bullets) and shotguns (with max. 4.5 mm shot only).)
Shooting sports	Membership in a sport shooting association, sport qualifications proven by association exam, valid competition license.	Rimfire guns with rifled bore up to 6 mm in caliber, centerfire guns with rifled bore up to 12 mm in caliber, smooth bore guns, black powder guns. (Note: Pre-1885 black powder guns are unrestricted; this provision allows possession of post-1885 black powder guns.)
Training	Being a certified firearms instructor running a registered business in firearms training. (Note: Sport instructor or trainer qualifications regulations in the public law have been abolished in 2016. Internal sports association rules are now regarded by police administrative departments as the basis for issuing training permits.)	All of the above, can include full-auto firearms when additional conditions are met.
Historical re-enactments	Membership in a historical society and active participation in re-enactment events.	Guns modified to fire blanks only, including full-auto ones.
Collecting	Membership in a gun collectors' association.	All of the above, excluding full-auto guns. (Note: In 2018 Supreme Administrative Court ruled that full auto firearms are dangerous weapons and cannot be issued for collectors despite the law allowing it explicitly.) (Note: The Article 10 of Weapons and Munitions Act regulates permits for individuals (implicitly, by saying that permit is issued for "applicant, who does not pose a threat to oneself"). Section 4 of this article determines what kinds of firearms can be owned for specific purposes, in particular clause 7) states that for collection purpose one can own all firearms specified in clauses 1) to 6) – while clause 2) dedicated to "protection of persons and property" purpose allows possession of 6 to 12 mm submachine guns in sub-clause c) and 5.45 to 7.62 mm full-auto rifles in sub-clause e). On the other hand, section 5 of the Article 10 says that a permit "cannot be issued, except as stated in Article 29 section 2" for "especially dangerous" weapons including, as stated in clause 1), "full-auto firearms able to hit targets at a distance". The mentioned article 29, however, refers to "firearm certificates" which are issued to institutions and businesses (also sole proprietorships) enumerated in its section 1, and not to individuals per se as regulated in Article 10; in its section 2 clause 1), Article 29 explicitly allows issuance of firearm certificates for full-auto weapons to private security companies or "organizers of trainings instructing in the profession of security guard". The conflicting provisions of sections 4 and 5 of the Article 10 and inconsistency between Articles 10 and 29 regarding "permits" and "firearm certificates" creates a situation, in which the Police routinely refuses issuing permits for full-auto guns for collectors. The controversy has been brought before administrative courts, with mixed results. In a 2013 judgment Supreme Administrative Court supported claims of a gun collector named as B. W., that section 4 clause 7) of the Article 10 is an exception from the general ban of full-auto guns expressed in section 5 of the same Article; however in a 2018 judgment the same Court, proceeding an appeal of a collector named as P. N., ruled otherwise – that section 5 is a lex specialis with regard to section 4.)
Memorial	Acquisition of a gun by inheritance, donation or distinction. (Note: Until the permit is issued, the acquired gun has to be held in the police deposit.)	All of the above, excluding full-auto guns.
Other (Note: Includes permits for non-standard purposes and permits for other weapons.)	As stated by the applicant (may-issue).	As prescribed in the permit.

Holders of self-defense and protection of persons and property permits have to pass medical and psychological re-evaluation every five years. Sport permit holders have to maintain valid shooting sport competition license, by taking part in four to eight shooting competitions per year depending on the number categories of firearms qualified for during sport exam: handgun, rifle or shotgun. Maintaining the license is essential to keep the important reason valid.

Each individual permit specifies the types and quantity of weapons the holder can own. The types allowed depend on gun permit type, sport qualifications actually held by passing exam in any or all of the three categories mentioned, and actual request by the applicant. Allowed quantities are determined at the discretion of the Police and vary greatly depending on permit type, documented needs of the applicant, and local police department practices. The permit holder may apply for an increased limit after running out of slots. One may apply for multiple types of permits to increase the total number of slots, such as sport and hunting or sport and collecting permits.

==== Gun handling permits ====
Additionally, individuals may apply for a gun handling permit which allows (temporary) possession, using, carrying and transporting of guns owned by businesses or institutions by their employees, or by persons having valid sport permits. Handling permits are mostly used by private security guards in order to legally carry firearms issued by their employing companies, however other people may also benefit from them, e.g. shooting range associates or members of sport shooting clubs, so they can bring club guns to a competition event in another club etc.

The conditions and requirements for gun handling permits are mostly the same as for ownership permits, but the fee is much lower. The same set of supporting documentation can be used for filing applications for a handling and ownership permits at the same time, therefore people applying for a sport shooting permit often apply for a handling permit as well, for a small extra fee.

==== Institutional permits ====
Institutions, businesses and other organizations may apply for firearm certificates if they operate in specific areas of business and fulfill related business licensing regulations. The entitled organizations include:

- businesses which have organized their own internal security services (such as major factories),
- businesses with a valid concession in private security services,
- shooting ranges,
- schools; sport, hunting and paramilitary organizations (solely for training purposes),
- film-making and other artistic enterprises,
- entities which employees' duties involve high exposure to the risk of being attacked,
- entities which need guns for signaling for help, search and rescue activities, or signaling the start of sport competitions,
- hunting grounds lessees or managers, for the purpose of sanitary shooting of animals.

The first two types of business units and schools providing instruction in private law enforcement may acquire full-auto weapons. The institutional permits (officially called "firearm certificates") are issued for each individual firearm. The guns owned by a business may be handled only by its employees or associates having a gun handling permit. The person using such a gun has to carry both the firearm certificate and the gun handling permit while carrying the gun.

The wording of the law suggests ("firearm certificate may be issued") that issuing of the certificate is discretionary, however in practice it is almost always issued if the business belongs to one of the categories listed above.

==== Registration cards ====
Owners of deactivated guns and air guns over 17 J muzzle energy have to register their guns, but no permit is required. Registration cards are issued automatically based on appropriate documentation provided, such as certificate of deactivation, proof of purchase, etc. Additionally, for such air guns, passing medical and psychological evaluation is mandatory, using the same procedure as for firearms.

==== European Firearms Pass ====
European Firearms Pass is issued by the Police on request of any legal owner of a firearm. It also applies to owners of unregulated firearms such as pre-1885 black powder guns or their modern replicas. The latter case is often used domestically as a formal proof of legal possession needed to buy black powder from local licensed dealers, as they are restricted to sell powder only to licensed persons.

=== Technical aspects ===
==== Fully automatic firearms ====
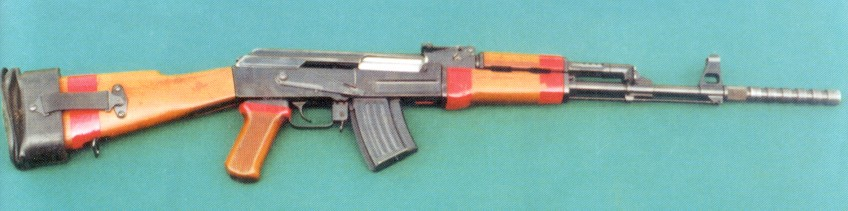
Kbkg wz. 1960 – polish automatic rifle, can only be obtained for training purposes and institutional permits

Currently the only way to obtain working fully automatic firearm in Poland is via institutional or training permit (or by opening a gun dealership business). Blank-firing full-auto firearms can be obtained for historical re-enactment purposes.

While permits for protection of persons and property purpose allow full-auto firearms according to the letter of the law, no such permit has been issued in the years 2015–2021; in 2022 one permit has been issued. In 2023, an amendment allowed military and law enforcement officers obtain such permits easily. As of 31 December 2025, 2,231 permits for protection of persons and property were active and 843 firearms were registered for such permits; it is not known publicly if any of them is full-auto. A few permits allowing full-auto firearms have been issued for collection purpose after 2011, however in 2018 Supreme Administrative Court ruled that a conflicting provision against dangerous weapons takes precedence over the list of purposes and allowed firearm types, therefore full-auto guns cannot be obtained by collectors since.

==== Sound suppressors ====
The Police is prohibited from issuing permits for "especially dangerous" firearms, in particular ones "equipped with a sound suppressor or adapted to shooting using a sound suppressor" – except for hunting permits. However, in practice only firearms with permanently attached suppressors are considered to fall under this rule as almost any firearm is capable of attaching a sound suppressor. Having a thread at the end of the barrel is not considered a feature making the firearm a prohibited one; even the Police considers the wording of the regulation as "imprecise". Suppressors themselves are unregulated; their sale and possession is legal. Using a suppressor is not directly prohibited apart from hunting, but different legal opinions exist and the case has not been tested in court.

In 2020 a new amendment to the Firearms and Munitions Act allowed the Police to issue permits for firearms with sound suppressors for hunting. Hunters are allowed to use them only for sanitary shooting of animals ordered by the authorities.

==== Ammunition and magazines ====
Armor-piercing, incendiary, explosive, tracer, sub-caliber (except shotgun shells) and other special ammunition is banned. Only valid firearms permit holders are allowed to buy or possess live ammunition, and only of the types exactly matching the guns they legally own; even a single non-matching round in possession may trigger criminal prosecution or revocation of the permit. The quantity of matching ammunition in possession is not limited. Hunters, collectors and sport shooters are allowed to manufacture (reload) ammunition, but strictly for their own use; they are allowed to buy and possess powder and primers, which are regulated items. Possession of bullets and empty casings is not regulated.

There's no limit on magazine capacity, except when hunting: maximum 6 rounds total, including magazine and all chambers, however for semi-auto guns a hunter can load only 2 rounds into the magazine (not including chambered rounds).

==== Firearm parts ====
Possession of essential parts of firearms is regulated in the same way as possession of fully functional firearms, regardless of their condition, unless they are officially deactivated, i.e. rendered useless for the purpose of building a functional firearm. The parts defined as essential are: frame, action, lower receiver, cylinder (of a revolver) and barrel with chamber (not a "raw" barrel). Please note that Polish firearm terminology is distinct from English one, therefore the aforementioned terms do not map exactly to what's regarded as essential parts in Polish law or its interpretation. The somewhat vague definitions may create legal risks regarding import, sale and ownership of less conventional firearms, some accessories, historical artefacts (even if severely damaged, thoroughly rusty etc.) It also means that licensed persons wishing to purchase spare parts or conversion kits often need to use up another slot in their permit.

==== Storage requirements ====
The law prescribes that guns and ammunition shall be stored in a way "preventing access to them by unauthorized persons". Detailed regulations for individuals mandate using gun safes certified as S1-class storage cabinets according to European Standard EN 14450, provided that the owner has 50 or less guns. The safes may be located anywhere, not necessarily at the owner's place of residence, provided that only the owner has the keys or codes to open them. Collectors can also store their guns in safe display cabinets equipped with shatterproof glass in a room with reinforced windows and doors, secured to prescribed levels and standards. The Police may pay a visit to check the safes and their certifications and verify the guns in possession (including serial numbers) against the permit, at any time. In practice such a visit is appointed beforehand, and it takes place shortly after the first purchase, but very rarely afterwards – if at all.

For institutions the requirements are much more complex: a separate "gun storage room" with masonry walls, no windows or bulletproof windows or windows secured with steel bars and mesh, having reinforced doors with certified locks and door bolt locked with a certified padlock, equipped with an electronic alarm connected to armed private security, a fire extinguisher (with at least 4 kg load of fire suppression agent), a fire blanket and a sandbox or another bullet-stopping device (for test firing after unloading). Besides that, guns in the storage room have to be unloaded and kept, along with ammunition, in S1-class gun safes; magazines shall be empty, but need not to be kept in safes. Some of these regulations also apply to private gun owners having more than 50 firearms. It is not clear from the letter of the law, what the requirements are if the owner of 50+ guns stores them at more than one place.

=== Usage restrictions ===
==== Carrying firearms ====
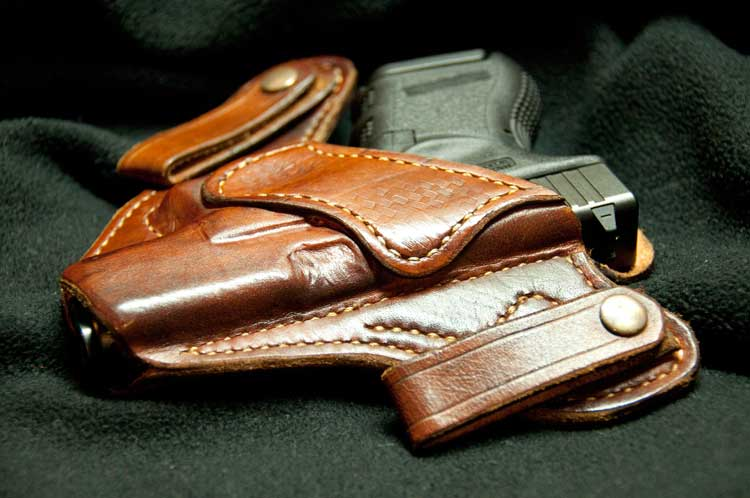
In Poland, guns have to be carried concealed, in a holster close to the body

The law defines carrying as "any means of moving a loaded weapon by a person possessing a weapon", without further specification of what a loaded state means, e.g. round in the chamber, or just a magazine connected, etc. Firearms owned for collecting or memorial purposes cannot be carried, unless specifically authorized by the Police in the permit-granting decision. Firearms owned for self-defense and protection of persons and property purposes shall be carried concealed "as inconspicuously as possible, in a tight-fitting holster close to the body". Other firearms shall be carried in the same way "if possible based on its [guns] quantity and size". The Police is entitled to limit or forbid carrying while issuing the permit at its discretion, but no such cases are publicly known.

Guns cannot be carried during public events and assemblies, in sea- and airports and on ships and airplanes (with exceptions) and in courts and state's attorney offices. Person carrying must be sober. Guns carried in public transport must be unloaded (no round in the chamber, no loaded magazines) except on self-defense and protection of persons and property permits – in this case the magazine can be loaded and connected, but no round shall be present in the chamber.

Hunting guns can be carried loaded only on hunting grounds.

Unlicensed black powder firearms can be carried loaded in public places (but not in public transport) without a permit.

There are no regulations regarding movement of unloaded guns, as long as they are under direct supervision of a licensed person. However the Ministry of Internal Affairs may forbid or limit carrying loaded or unloaded guns on the whole Polish territory or in certain places for a limited time. It has become a common practice to issue ministerial regulations enforcing such limits during major events such as international conferences (NATO summit, UNESCO WHC session, OSCE PA session), visits of prominent political figures (M. Pompeo, D. Trump, J. Biden, V. Zelenskyy), mass public gatherings (rock festival, Pope Francis's visit), or even on such occasions as National Independence Day. During the 2021–2022 Belarus–European Union border crisis, such a ban has been announced for communities along Polish-Belarusian border, initially based on state of emergency laws, then – after the state of emergency has been lifted because of duration limits – based on firearms law. (Note: Because of a crisis on the Belarusian border, on 2 September 2021 the President announced the state of emergency in localities along the border, initially for 30 days, even if the Constitution allows enacting such state for 90 days. It was later extended for another 60 days – the constitutional limit for one-time extension. The presidential orders were accompanied with corresponding ministerial regulations banning carrying and transporting of firearms and ammunition. Because of said limits, the state of emergency and the carrying ban expired on 1 December 2021. On 30 November 2021 the Minister of Internal Affairs issued a regulation, based on Weapons and Munitions Act, banning carrying along the border from 1 December 2021 to 1 March 2022. On 28 February, another regulation banned carrying from 2 March to 30 June 2022. Therefore the provision in the Weapons and Munitions Act allowing enacting bans only "for a limited time" is effectively circumvented.)

==== Unrestricted weapons and uses ====
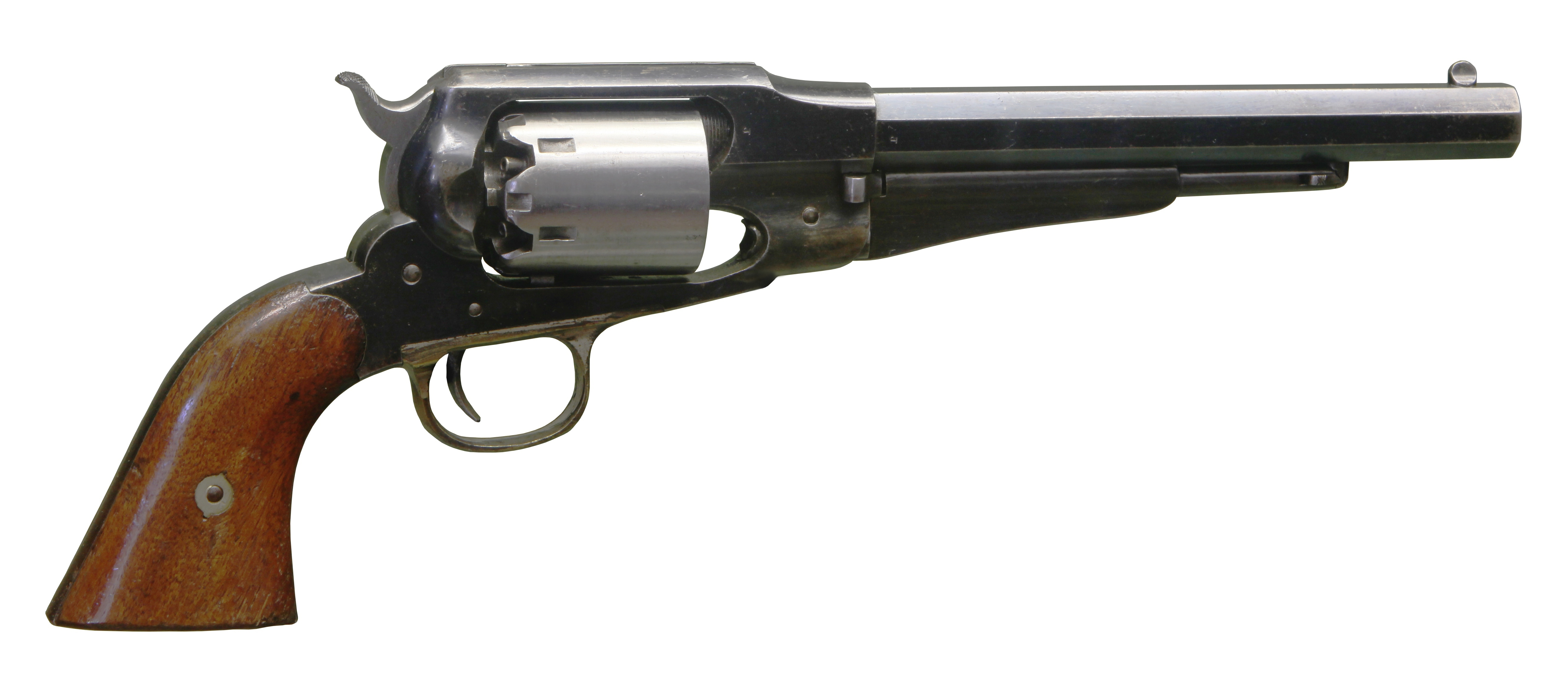
Black powder guns made before 1885 and their modern replicas can be purchased and carried without permit in Poland

Black powder firearms designed before 1885 not using pre-assembled ammunition or their modern functional replicas require no permit to own, and are therefore quite popular in the shooting community. There are no official or industry statistics about the volume of sale; estimates vary from 200 to 800 thousands. Separate bill of law allows businesses to sell black powder only to customers who show either a firearm permit or a European Firearms Pass issued for a black powder firearm. The restriction is often circumvented by asking a colleague (there's no restriction on private sale or just giving out of black powder) or by buying powder in neighboring countries, mostly in Czechia.

Other types of unrestricted weapons include:

- deactivated firearms (certificate of deactivation is required),
- electroshock weapons with current not exceeding 10 mA,
- handheld incapacitating gas dispensers,
- air guns up to 17 joules of muzzle energy; more powerful air guns need to be registered with the Police, but no permit is required,
- alarm guns with caliber less than 6 mm.

Some uses do not require a permit:

- keeping gun collections as a part of an official museum (also a private one), subject to other regulations,
- using guns for sport, training and recreational purposes at registered shooting ranges,
- using signal and alarm guns for signaling for help, or for signaling the start of sport competitions,
- handling guns by licensed firearm trade businesses or gunsmiths,
- handling guns subject to deactivation or to be certified as deactivated.

==== Other restricted weapons ====
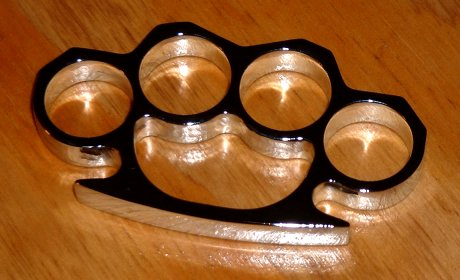
Brass knuckles possession is restricted and needs a permit in Poland

Other types of weapons that require permit according to the law include:

- (non-handheld) incapacitating gas dispensers;
- specific melee weapons:
  - blades hidden in objects that do not look like weapons,
  - brass knuckles,
  - nunchakus,
  - batons having endings or implements made of heavy and hard material,
  - batons made of wood or other heavy and hard material, imitating a baseball bat;
- crossbows;
- electroshock weapons with current exceeding 10 mA.

Some people managed to obtain crossbow permits. As of 2019 there were 13 such permits. Crossbows need to be bought in other countries, as there are no dealers in Poland because of legal difficulties and resulting low demand. However, the law does not clearly specify what paperwork is needed to import a crossbow from a country that does not recognize it as a controlled item.

Provision against nunchakus is not enforced in general, martial arts practitioners use them normally. However getting caught with a nunchaku in dubious circumstances can cause legal issues. There's a single known case of a nunchaku permit.

Detailed statistics regarding permits issued for weapons other than firearms are not published officially, however more detailed statistics for 2019 obtained by invoking the Freedom of Information Act have been compiled and published.

=== Shooting ranges ===
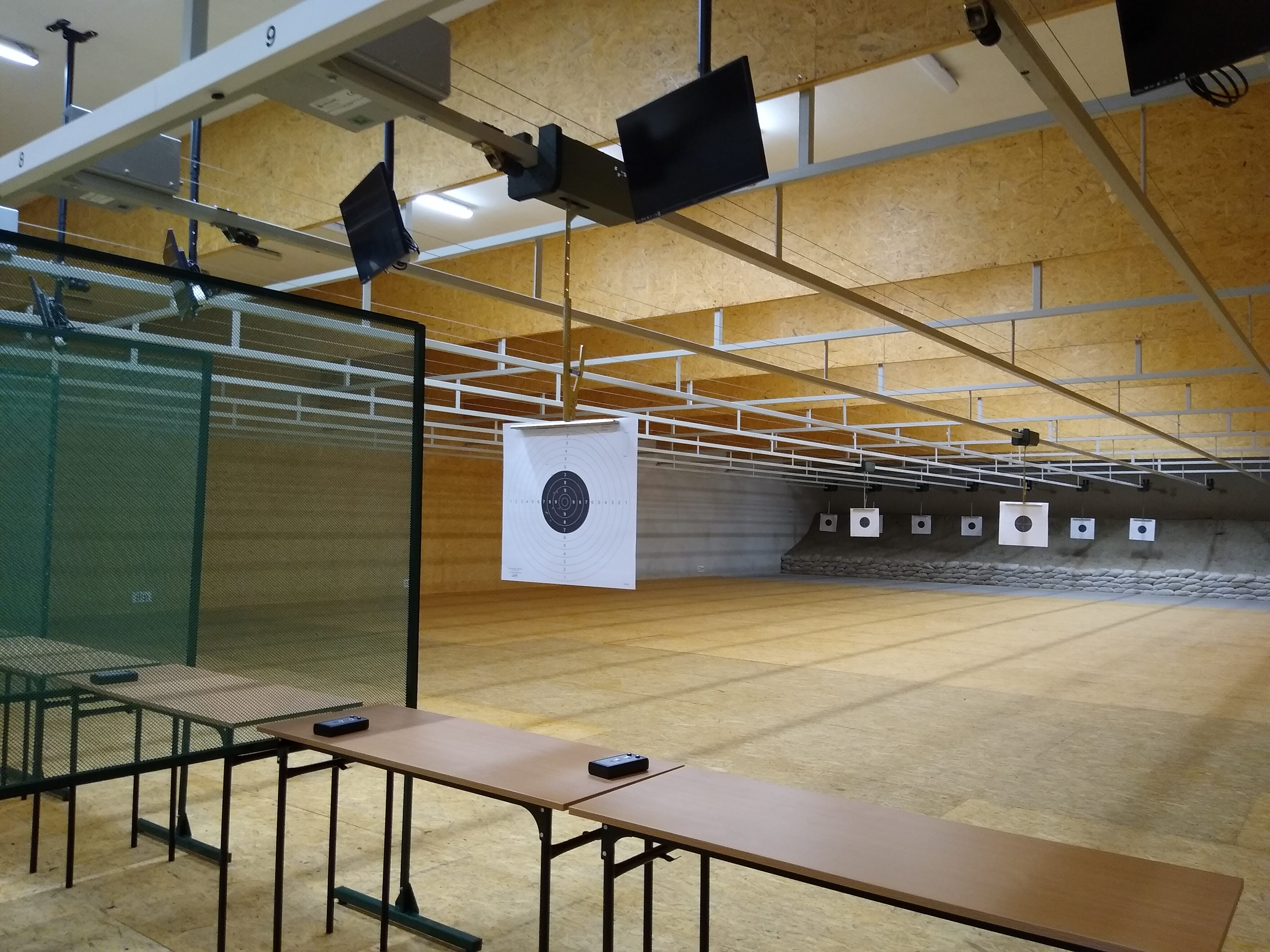
Indoor shooting range in Kolbuszowa, Poland

Shooting ranges in Poland are regulated facilities – it is illegal to use firearms, air guns and other weapons outside of an officially recognized shooting range, even on a large private property. The regulations are rather liberal, but imprecise, which may create administrative difficulties in organizing and operating a shooting range.

The regulations are threefold: environmental, safety-related and, in case of indoor ranges or outdoor ranges requiring erection of structures, general laws such as building code, fire code and other regulations related to erection and maintenance of buildings. Specific regulations are set in the Weapons and Munitions Act Chapter 4 (Articles 45 to 49):

- using "firearms and other weapons able to hit targets at a distance" outside of shooting ranges for sport and training purposes is prohibited;
- ranges shall be localized, organized and operated according to environmental and safety rules (both to be regulated by appropriate ministries), in particular "precluding a possibility of a projectile exiting shooting range grounds, provided that it was fired from an appointed shooting stand in accordance with range safety rules", the model rules to be defined by the Minister of Internal Affairs;
- range safety rules shall be approved by local authority (mayor or wójt);

Environmental rules for outdoor ranges are rather simple: water table shall be at least 1 m below surface; a range using firearms shall not be localized in zones dedicated for residential, health care, or recreational purposes, or near kids and youth facilities; berms shall be cleaned of lead-containing ammo once in 3, 5, or 7 years (depending on water table level) and kept at pH of 6.5 to 8.5. In any case (outdoor or indoor ranges) legal noise limits shall be observed.

Model range safety rules promulgated by the Minister of Internal Affairs, as further amended, are to be implemented by range owners and posted in a visible place; an owner can post rules stricter than ministerial ones. Major provisions mandate:

- presence of a range safety officer ("shooting leader"), who shall be a person trained in range safety and first aid by attending an official course, and is responsible for patrons' safety, directing the shooting process including appointing firing positions, and keeping a register of patrons;
- maintaining a register of patrons, including their first and last names, gun permit numbers or addresses (in case of people not having permits), and signatures certifying that the patrons acquainted themselves with safety rules;
- rules of operating guns, such as loading and unloading (only at firing booths or positions), checking unloaded state by range safety officer, maintaining safe muzzle direction, carrying outside of firing positions (unboxed, with action open; pistols and revolvers can be carried in holsters), etc.
- rules of safe behavior.

=== Self defense ===
The Weapons and Munitions Act does not relate directly with self-defense, even if it allows limited possession of guns for self-defense purpose. The limitations of self-defense permits manifest in restriction of kinds of weapons that can be purchased on such permit to handguns (including gas guns and blank-firing guns), electroshock devices and incapacitating gas dispensers, the obligation to retake medical and psychological evaluations every five years and, most importantly, the need to show the important reason for possession of firearms of a "constant, real and higher than average" threat to one's life, health or property. According to the statistics, the number of guns registered for self-defense permit is only slightly larger than the number of permits, which indicates that the Police allows possession of only one firearm per permit holder in most cases, which is another significant limitation. Until 2014 the major benefit of a self-defense permit was the possibility of carrying a loaded firearm legally; it remains a benefit to be able to carry in public transport. Otherwise, the purpose of the permit does not make a difference in legal standing of a defender who have used a legally owned firearm in an actual self-defense situation.

In the context of criminal law, self-defense, including defense of others, property and other rights, is codified succinctly in the Article 25 of the Polish Penal Code, without regard of what means or tools have been used for defense, by establishing a legal justification. The Article 25 section 1 says that "does not commit a crime who acts in necessary defense by repelling a direct and unlawful attack on any right protected by law". Further sections define possible mitigations in sentencing, while still recognizing the defendant has committed a crime, in case the defender "exceeds the limits of necessary defense" in some circumstances. In particular, section 2a introduced in 2017 codifies a limited castle doctrine, by excluding punishment if the defendant used excessive force while protecting one's home unless "exceeding the limits of necessary defense was gross". The Penal Code does not elaborate on what the limits of defense are, therefore the interpretation of excessive use of force is left to the justice system, both the public prosecution and the courts, with widely disparate results. In practice, using a firearm in self-defense in most cases triggers a lengthy criminal investigation and court case, often involving pre-trial detention.

The number of active permits issued for self-defense purpose steadily decreased until 2022. It is not clear if administrative decisions revoking the permits were the result of active review on the Police's behalf, such as challenging ongoing existence of the "important reason" of threat to life, or the permit holders losing interest in keeping them and neglecting to fulfill formal requirements, such as periodic medical and psychological re-evaluations.

The permits issued for protection of persons and property used to be a curiosity. The wording of the law and the kinds of firearms allowed suggest this kind of permits was originally intended for private security businesses. However, according to police statistics, there were only 67 such permits active and 68 firearms registered at the end of 2014, after whole fifteen years of the new law being in force. Throughout 2015 the numbers fell to nine permits and ten firearms registered for the purpose. Statistics for 2022 showed ten permits and ten firearms; one new permit had been granted in that year. Meanwhile, the private security industry has been dominated by businesses incorporated as private limited companies, which acquire their armaments on firearm certificates. The individuals working as security guards need to obtain gun handling permits, on top of having to finish specialized education and acquire the legal status of a "qualified private security worker" in order to legally fulfill their duties while armed.

However, an amendment enacted in 2023 allowed persons who serve in the military or law enforcement agencies to obtain permits for self defence or protection of persons and property, after declaring "willingness to strengthen the defense potential of the Republic of Poland". This sparked a new interest in these permits, pumping up the statistics.

=== Penalties ===
==== Misdemeanors ====
Carrying an otherwise legally owned gun (loaded or not) without having proper documentation on one's person is punishable by fine. The following misdemeanors are punishable by fine or jail time, including optional forfeiture of guns and ammunition:

- unlicensed sale or possession of (more powerful) air guns, (non-handheld) tear gas dispensers or other restricted weapons and devices,
- failing to register a gun or place a gun into police deposit, according to regulations,
- failing to notify the Police of loss or sale of a (registered) weapon or ammunition,
- failing to notify the Police of a change of the address of permanent residence,
- carrying under influence of alcohol or other psychoactive substances,
- crossing the borders with weapons or ammunition without declaring it or without proper documentation,
- shipping weapons or ammunition in violation of applicable regulations,
- storing or carrying weapons or ammunition in a way that allows access to it by unauthorized persons,
- transporting guns or ammunition in public transport against the regulations,
- transporting guns or ammunition in the cabin of an aircraft (unless specifically authorized),
- carrying against legal prohibition,
- using a gun able to hit targets at a distance for training or leisure out of a shooting range,
- violation of range safety rules,
- failing to return permit or registration documents to the issuing authority (after a withdrawal of a permit),
- failing to notify the Police in writing about a date and place of a gun event (hunting, sport or historical re-enactment) with participation of foreigners and the approximate number of participants.

According to the provisions of the Misdemeanors Code, a fine could amount anything from 20 to 5000 Polish złoty and jail time from 5 to 30 days.

The Misdemeanors Code itself penalizes carrying while taking part in public gatherings by fine, community service or jail up to 14 days.

==== Felonies ====
Intentionally abandoning or discarding firearms or ammunition is a felony punishable by fine (theoretically, according to the Penal Code, up to one million złoty), community service or prison time of up to two years.

The Polish Penal Code states that:

- Using a firearm, a knife or similarly dangerous object while committing battery or taking part in a brawl is punishable by 6 months to 8 years of prison.
- Using a firearm, a knife or similarly dangerous object while attacking a public officer or deputy in service is punishable by 1 to 10 years of prison; if it results in grievous bodily harm, it's punishable by 2 to 12 years.
- Unlicensed manufacturing or sale of firearms or ammunition is punishable by 1 to 10 years of prison. Modifying guns to change the caliber, purpose or type (e.g. semi-auto to full-auto) is considered manufacturing.
- Unlicensed possession of firearms or ammunition is punishable by 6 months to 8 years of prison.
- Transferring firearms by a licensed person to an unlicensed person is punishable by fine, community service or prison of up to 2 years.
- Unintentionally causing a loss of a legally owned firearm or ammunition is punishable by fine, community service or prison up to 1 year.
- Aggravated robbery using a firearm, a knife or similarly dangerous object is punishable by 3 to 12 years of prison.

== Firearm ownership ==
Number of active permits issued for top purposes by year (in thousands). Source: KGP

As of 31 December 2025, there were 1,037,778 registered firearms and 411,769 active permits. These numbers pertain to guns owned by individual citizens. Statistics regarding guns owned by businesses and civil institutions, guns requiring only a registration and persons authorized to use guns owned by their employers are not published officially. However, data obtained in 2020 on the basis of Freedom of Information Act shed some light on these aspects: as of 31 December 2019 there were 95,663 people having "gun handling permits" and there were 3,038 deactivated firearms and 4,813 air guns over 17 J muzzle energy registered with the Police. The number of unlicensed black powder firearms sold to date remains unknown.

According to Small Arms Survey of 2017 there were total 968,000 licit and illicit firearms or around 2.5 per 100 people.

Firearm ownership in Poland (2025)
Purpose	Current number of permits	New permits (2025)	Registered firearms
Self-defense	47,931	7,245	41,651
Protection of persons and property	2,231	676	843
Hunting	141,560	3,975	408,731
Sport shooting	101,755	17,601	274,437
Historical re-enactments	108	2	365
Collection	114,542	21,071	298,881
Memorial	1,662	5	2,486
Training	1,681	213	13,137
Other	299	12	247
Total	411,769	50,709	1,037,778

== Gun deaths and crime ==
Homicides and suicides using firearm in Poland since 2002. Source: KGP (Note: Since 2012, police firearm-related crime statistics cited here clump together homicides and homicide attempts. Before 2012, homicide attempts using a firearm were not included in officially published firearm-related crime statistics at all.)

Gun crimes are very rare in Poland. According to police statistics number of homicides and homicide-attempts using firearm decreased from 111 in 2002 to 21 in 2023, reaching a low of 12 in 2019. Number of suicides using firearm increased from 55 to 99 in the same period.

Mass shootings are almost non-existent. Examples include school shooting in May 2019 when a student wounded two people using an unlicensed black powder firearm and some fireworks, and the 2026 Kraków shooting.

Police firearm use cases since 1993. Source: KGP (Note: Since 2013, police shooting reporting changed, according to the new rules of use of force, creating a legal distinction between using a firearm (i.e. firing a projectile towards a person) and employing a firearm (i.e. firing a projectile towards an animal, an object, or in other direction not posing a threat to a person).)

According to the low crime rates and legal restrictions of firearms use by police forces, there are very few police shootings as well, even if basically all officers carry their service pistols while on duty.

== See also ==
- Hunting license
- Overview of gun laws by nation

== Sources ==
- "Internetowy System Aktów Prawnych" [Internet Legal Acts System] (in Polish). Sejm.
- Pospieszalski, Karol Marian (2019). Documenta Occupationis. Nazi Occupation "Law" in Poland. Selected Documents. Part II: General Government (PDF) (in English and German). Translated by Crawford, Graham; Anessi, Thomas; Kotkowski, Krzysztof. Poznań: Institute for Western Affairs. ISBN 978-83-61736-91-2.
- Kasprzak, Jerzy (2013). "Władza państwowa a posiadanie broni przez obywateli na przestrzeni dziejów" [State power and the possession of weapons by citizens throughout history] (PDF). Studia Prawnoustrojowe (in Polish). 22. Olsztyn: University of Warmia and Mazury: 207–228.
- Kasprzak, Jerzy; Brywczyński, Wiesław (2013). Nielegalne posiadanie broni i amunicji. Studium prawno-kryminalistyczne [Illegal possession of weapons and ammunition. Legal and forensic science study.] (in Polish). Białystok: Temida2. ISBN 978-83-62813-31-5.
- Kurzyński, Michał; Tomczyk, Arkadiusz (2021). "Praktyczne aspekty transgranicznego handlu bronią palną za pośrednictwem Internetu" [Practical aspects of cross-border trade in firearms over the Internet]. Studia Prawnoustrojowe (in Polish). 52. Olsztyn: University of Warmia and Mazury: 209–220.
- Koper, Adam (2018a). "Posiadanie broni w Polsce w okresie międzywojennym" [Possession of weapons in Poland in the inter-war period]. MILMAG (in Polish). No. 2(4)/2018. pp. 252–259. ISSN 2544-3917.
- Koper, Adam (2018b). "Posiadanie broni w PRL (1945–1989)" [Possession of weapons in Polish People's Republic (1945–1989)]. MILMAG (in Polish). No. 7(9)/2018. pp. 150–155. ISSN 2544-3917.
- Koper, Adam (2021-03-24). "Posiadanie broni palnej w latach 1990" [Possession of firearms in the 1990s]. MILMAG (in Polish). ISSN 2544-3917.
