= IPSC Polish Rifle Championship =

Annual practical shooting championship

The IPSC Polish Rifle Championship is an IPSC level 3 championship held once a year by the Polish Sport Shooting Federation.

== Champions ==
The following is a list of current and previous champions.

=== Overall category ===
Year	Division	Gold	Silver	Bronze	Venue
2016	Open	(Poland) Leszek Sokolowski	(Poland) Tomasz Czekala	(Poland) Przemysław Lewandowski	
2016	Standard	(Poland) Lukasz Borkowski	(Poland) Jakub Stadnickt	(Poland) Dariusz Adamski	

=== Senior category ===
Year	Division	Gold	Silver	Bronze	Venue
2016	Open	(Poland) Andrzej Tomczak	(Poland) Andrzej Kaniewski	(Poland) Slawomir Czauderna	
