= European Firearms Pass =

Firearms license in the European Union

The European Firearms Pass (EFP) is a locally issued firearms licence in a common format that allows citizens of the European Union (EU) to travel with one or more firearm(s) mentioned on the licence from one member state to another. For certain purposes other documentation may be required, depending on the current states' laws and the reason for the movement; a transfer may be temporary (for a competition) or permanent (on a sale). An applicant for an EFP must already hold a licence from the member state in which he/she holds the firearm.

== Functions ==
The EFP is required by and benefits:

- hunters of deer, wild boar, game birds and vermin carrying their firearm(s) into another EU member state
- target shooters involved in international competitions in the EU
- Dealers, sellers and importers of firearms across EU borders
- Specialist collectors and museums

The EFP extends the "Four Freedoms" to the EU's licensed sports shooters, gun collectors and dealers.

== EEC / EU Directives ==
The European Firearms Pass was first introduced in the European Firearms Directive of 1991. The amending directive 2008/51/EC was approved in May 2008 and member states' laws had to comply with it by 28 July 2010.

- Clause 14 comments that:

"The European firearms pass functions in a satisfactory way on the whole and should be regarded as the main document needed by hunters and marksmen for the possession of a firearm during a journey to another Member State. Member States should not make the acceptance of the European firearms pass conditional upon the payment of any fee or charge."

- Article 1 amends article 4 of the 1991 directive to:

"4. A “European firearms pass” shall be issued on request by the authorities of a Member State to a person lawfully entering into possession of and using a firearm. It shall be valid for a maximum period of five years, which may be extended, and shall contain the information set out in Annex II. It shall be non-transferable and shall record the firearm or firearms possessed and used by the holder of the pass. It must always be in the possession of the person using the firearm and any change in the possession or characteristics of the firearm, as well as the loss or theft thereof, shall be indicated on the pass."

== See also ==
- Air travel with firearms and ammunition
- Law of the European Union
- Overview of gun laws by nation – Regulations on arms and ammunition
