= Polish Sport Shooting Federation =

- Polski Związek Strzelectwa Sportowego
- Abbreviation: PZSS
- Formation: 1933
- Legal status: association
- Headquarters: Warsaw
- President: Tomasz Kwiecień
- Affiliations: ISSF IPSC
- Website: pzss.org.pl ipsc-pl.org

The Polish Sport Shooting Federation, Polish: Polski Związek Strzelectwa Sportowego, is the Polish government-mandated national sport association for sport shooting affiliated to the International Practical Shooting Confederation (IPSC) and the International Shooting Sport Federation (ISSF).
