= Gun debate =

The gun debate may refer to:

- Gun politics
- Gun politics in the United States
- Gun control
