= List of rampage killers in the Americas =

This is a list of mass or spree killers in the Americas (excluding the United States). A mass murderer is typically defined as someone who kills three or more people in one incident, with no "cooling off" period, not including themselves. A mass murder typically occurs in a single location where one or more persons kill several others.

Specific notable subtypes of mass murder, including politically motivated crimes, workplace killings, school attacks and familicides, have their own lists.

This list does not include serial killers or major figures in politics and government who orchestrated such actions.

== List of rampage killers ==
Perpetrator	Date	Year	Location	Country	Killed	Injured	W	Additional notes	Ref.
Alves, Adilson Marcelino, 21 dos Santos, Jose, 31 dos Santos, Walter Rosa,	Dec 17	1961	Niterói	Brazil	503	800+	A	Alves was sentenced to 16 years in prison. Jose dos Santos was sentenced to 14 years in prison. Walter Rosa dos Santos was sentenced to 16 years in prison.	
Escudero Aponte, Héctor, 35; Jímenez Rivera, Armando, 29; Rivera López, José Francisco, 40	Dec 31	1986	San Juan	Puerto Rico	96-98	140	A	Both Escudero Aponte and Rivera López were sentenced to 99 years in prison. Jiménez Rivera was sentenced to 75 years in prison.	
Chiasson, Louis, 64	Dec 2	1969	Notre-Dame-du-Lac, Quebec	Canada	38-44	2	A	Sentenced to life imprisonment	
Delgado Morales, Campo Elías, 52 (Note: At least one of the victims was a relative of the assailant.)	Dec 4	1986	Bogotá	Colombia	29	12	FMA	Killed by police	
Guay, Albert, 33 Pitre, Marguerite, 41 Ruest, Généreux, 51	Sep 9	1949	Sault-au-Cochon, Quebec	Canada	23	0	E	Bombed Canadian Pacific Air Lines Flight 108. Sentenced to death and executed	
Wortman, Gabriel, 51	April 18–19	2020	Nova Scotia	Canada	22	3	F A	Killed by police	
Rojas Rodríguez, Aldemar José	Jan 17	2019	Bogotá	Colombia	21	68	E	Committed suicide	
Kenney, John Edward, 27	June 21	1977	Saint John, New Brunswick	Canada	21	?	A	Convicted	
Batista, Aluízio Farias, 26	Feb 25	1984	Natal	Brazil	19	12+	V	Escaped; Captured in 2026	
Ferreira de França, Genildo, 27	May 21–22	1997	Santo Antônio de Potengi	Brazil	14	1	F	Died by suicide	
Lo, Kai-Ji Adam, 30	April 26	2025	Vancouver	Canada	11	32+	V	Arrested	
Sanderson, Myles Brandon, 32	Sep 4	2022	James Smith Cree Nation & Weldon, Saskatchewan	Canada	11	17	M	Died in police custody	
Minassian, Alek, 25	April 23	2018	Toronto, Ontario	Canada	11	15	V	Sentenced to life imprisonment One of the victims died in 2021; attributed to this event	
Lozano Velásquez, Juan de Jesús, 26	June 24	2000	Bogotá	Colombia	11	7	F	Sentenced to 40 years in prison	
Caceres, Gregorio, 50	Feb 18	1942	Trujillo	Venezuela	11	4	M	Killed	
Unknown	Dec 19	1962	Havana	Cuba	11	?		Killed by soldiers	
Flores Eliseo, Óscar, 35	July 31	2005	San Jerónimo de Juárez	Mexico	11	2	FM	Injured by police, killed by angry mob	
Aroma, Dennis, 43	Dec 28	2025	Richelieu	Suriname	9	2	M	Committed suicide	
Hoffman, Victor Ernest, 21 (Note: All the victims were members of the same family.) (Note: All the victims were killed in the same household.)	Aug 15	1967	Shell Lake, Saskatchewan	Canada	9	0	F	Found not guilty by reason of insanity	
Lima, Emival Menezes, 21; Ximenes, Carlos Roberto, 24	March 31	1984	Araguaína	Brazil	9	0	FM	Both sentenced to 261 years in prison	
Hyatt, Thaddeus, 26	March 30	1959	Labyrinth	Jamaica	8	14	M	Sentenced to death and executed	
Taucci Monteiro, Guilherme, 17; Henrique de Castro, Luiz, 25	March 13	2019	Suzano	Brazil	8	11	FME	Died by suicide	
A., Sergio Eduardo, 21	June 21	2022	Jacona & Zamora	Mexico	8	4	F	Killed by police	
García Antonio, Germán	May 2	1985	Guadalupe la Mexicana	Mexico	8	1	F	Died by suicide	
Nelson, Dale Merle, 31	Sep 5	1970	Creston, British Columbia	Canada	8	0	FM	Sentenced to life imprisonment	
Martins, Terezinha, 40	Oct 3	1999	Nova América da Colina	Brazil	8	0	A	Sentenced to 150 years in prison	
García, Junior Fabiano (Note: Assailant was a member of the military, police, or a comparable force at the time of the rampage.)	Jul 15	2022	Paraná	Brazil	8	0	FM	Committed suicide	
Modesto Filho, Manoel	Oct 22–23	1939	São Paulo	Brazil	7	12	F	Died by suicide	
José Vidal Céspedes, 39	Jan 31	1993	Acahay	Paraguay	7	9	V	Sentenced to 25 years in prison, later changed to 22 years	
Barraga, Jose Alberto, 34	Feb 18	1968	Tello	Colombia	7	4	M	Killed by soldiers	
Klemmensen, Abel, 18	Jan 1	1990	Narsaq	Greenland	7	1	F	Sentenced to life imprisonment	
Colombo, 35	Oct 4	1939	Rosario	Argentina	7	1	F	Died by suicide	
McCallum, Frederick Moses, 19	Jan 30	1969	Buffalo Narrows, Saskatchewan	Canada	7	1	M	Found not guilty by reason of insanity	
dos Santos, Luiz Gonzaga Pereira	June 29	1979	Triunfo	Brazil	7	0	F	Escaped, killed on shootout in 1981; Suspect in 4 other murders	
Jean Carlos Hernández, 21; Reynaldo Cuadra McBean, 25	July 17	2020	Gatun Lake	Panama	7	0	F	McBean sentenced to 50 years in prison Hernández sentenced to 36 years	
Vasquez, Ignacio	Jan 31	1960	San Francisco Piletas	Mexico	7	?	F	Died by suicide	
Bissonnette, Alexandre, 27	Jan 29	2017	Quebec City, Quebec	Canada	6	19	F	Sentenced to life in prison	
Santana Cedano, José Ángelo, 39	July 24	2021	Higüey	Dominican Republic	6	8	F	Killed by police	
Rolle, Reuben, 30	May 20	1964	Nassau	(The Bahamas) Bahamas	6	6	F	Died by suicide One more died from a heart attack	
Navarrete Gómez, Luis Alonso, 28	June 2	2000	El Tablón	El Salvador	6	4	F	Sentenced to 30 years in prison	
Milhomem, Mauro	June 1	1980	Barra do Garças	Brazil	6	4	V	Died in the crash	
Lepine, William Bernard, 27	Aug 28	1972	Kettle Valley, British Columbia	Canada	6	3	F	Found not guilty by reason of insanity	
Headley, Hubert, 33	Dec 9	1994	Buxton & Friendship	Guyana	6	3	M	Killed by police Also killed a dog	
Rivas, Valerio, 47	April	1941	Bahía Blanca	Argentina	6	2	M	Killed by police	
Jiménez Rodríguez, Alberto; Farfán Moore, Yair	June 10	2007	Balsillas	Colombia	6	2	F	Both were sentenced to 40 years in prison	
Barreto, Miguel	Oct 5	1991	Hatillo	Puerto Rico	6	2	M	Killed	
Roldán Concha, José Misael, 27	July 7	1957	Pupunahue	Chile	6	1	MA	Sentenced to death, later changed to life imprisonment Also killed a person in 1954	
Shearing, David William, 23	Aug 10/16/17	1982	Near Clearwater, British Columbia	Canada	6	0	FMA	Sentenced to 25 years to life	
Valenzuela Torres, Jorge del Carmen, 22	Aug 20	1960	San Carlos	Chile	6	0	M	Sentenced to death and executed Suspect in 1 other murder	
Pino, Fabio Jesús, 25	June 28	1962	Mariquita	Colombia	6	0	F	Died by suicide	
Unknown	Feb	1994	Barragem	Brazil	6	0	FM	Unsolved	
Ferreira Costa, William Roberto, 27	Dec 21	2016	Jaboticabal	Brazil	6	0	F	Sentenced to 61 years and 3 months in prison	
Cearense, Augusto	May 4	1914	Minas Gerais	Brazil	5–6	?	F	Killed by police	
Martins, Pedro	Jan 31	1957	Vira Saia	Brazil	5	15	M	Killed	
Rivera, Nicolas Sanchez	Dec 24–25	1944	Manzanillo	Mexico	5	10	F	Killed by soldiers	
Romero Naupay, Eduardo Glicerio, 32	Feb 17	2017	Lima	Peru	5	9	F	Killed by police	
Fontaine, Dakota Randan, 17	Jan 22	2016	La Loche, Saskatchewan	Canada	5	6	F	Sentenced to life in prison	
Hope, Seon, 35	Feb 23	1933	Haggatts	Barbados	5	5	MA	Sentenced to death and executed	
Castillo, Araya Douglas, 32	Jan 2–3	2005	Paquera	Costa Rica	5	1	F	Committed suicide	
Villi, Francesco, 73	Dec 18	2022	Vaughan, Ontario	Canada	5	1	F	Fatally shot by police officers	
Euler Fernando Grandolpho	11 Dec	2018	Campinas	Brazil	5	4	F	Committed suicide.	
De Giusti, Walter	Oct 31–Nov 7	1986	Rosario	Argentina	5	0	F M	Died from HIV/AIDS	
Pissardo, Gustavo, 22	Sep 29	1994	Sao Jose dos Campos	Brazil	5	0	F	Sentenced to 63 years and 4 months imprisonment	
de Grood, Matthew, 22	April 15	2014	Calgary, Alberta	Canada	5	0	M	Not criminally responsible by reason of mental illness	
Felix, Jamie Randy, 32	Nov 26	2023	Winnipeg, Manitoba	Canada	5	0	F	Arrested; One of the victims died in 2025; attributed to this event	
Peterkin, Eric, 38	May 14	1977	Daniel Town	Jamaica	4	13	F	Killed by police	
Rodrigues Castiglioni, Gabriel, 16	Nov 25	2022	Aracruz	Brazil	4	11	FM	Sentenced to 3 years' compulsory detention	
Amigo Vergara, Alejandro, 33	April 8	1974	Talca	Chile	4	7	M	Killed by police	
Heredia, Félix Yerle Aneury, 22	Jan 19	2015	San Cristóbal	Dominican Republic	4	3	F	Committed suicide	
Lebrun, Pierre, 40	April 6	1999	Ottawa, Ontario	Canada	4	2	F	Fatally shot himself	
de la Puente Flores, Abelardo; Dorrego Silva, Claudio	Oct 6	1923	Punta Arenas	Chile	4	2	M	De la Puente was sentenced to death and executed. Dorrego was killed by a prison guard during an attempted murder of de la Puente while imprisoned.	
Hernández Fernández, Félix Ramón, 58	July 8	2021	Arroyo Naranjo	Cuba	4	2	MA	Committed suicide	
Fabrikant, Valery	Aug 24	1992	Montreal, Quebec	Canada	4	1	F	Sentenced to life in prison	
Melogno, Ricardo	September	1982	Lomas del Mirador and Mataderos	Argentina	4	0	F	Sentenced to life imprisonment	
Ibáñez Romero, Jaime Patricio, 53	Aug 31	2011	Quinta de Tilcoco	Chile	4	0	F	Died by suicide in 2014 while awaiting trial.	
Roszko, James, 46	March 3	2005	Mayerthorpe, Alberta	Canada	4	0	F	Committed suicide	
Milla Rojas, Adán del Rosario, 34	Jan 28	2005	Punitaqui	Chile	4	0	FM	Sentenced to life imprisonment	
Salvo Zúñiga, Juan Domingo, 44	Nov 25	1990	Paiguano	Chile	4	0	M	Sentenced to death, later changed to life imprisonment Also killed a person and injured another in 1975	
Pessoto, Duilio, 56	March 1	2001	Jundiaí, São Paulo	Brazil	4	0	F	Fatally shot himself	
Booher, Vernon, 20	July 9	1928	Mannville, Alberta	Canada	4	0	F	Executed	
Riffo Sandoval, María Jesús, 48	Oct 8	1975	Angol	Chile	3	40	P	Sentenced to 20 years in prison	
de Gouveia, João, 37	Dec 6	2002	Caracas	Venezuela	3	29	F	Sentenced to 29 years and 11 months in prison	
Lortie, Denis, 25	May 8	1984	Quebec City, Quebec	Canada	3	13	FM	Sentenced to life imprisonment Released from prison in 1996	
Solich, Rafael, 15	Sep 28	2004	Carmen de Patagones	Argentina	3	5	F	Declared too young to face charges	
Mateus da Costa Meira	Nov 3	1999	São Paulo	Brazil	3	4	F	Sentenced to 48 years on appeal.	
Muñoz Vega, Carlos, 35	Dec 22	2024	Santiago	Chile	3	3	F	Arrested	
Bishop, Christopher Raymond, 21	January 6	2007	Cambridge Bay, Nunavut	Canada	3	2	F	Sentenced to life imprisonment Released from prison in 2017	
Bourque, Justin, 24	June 4–6	2014	Moncton, New Brunswick	Canada	3	2	F	Sentenced to life in prison	
Yoshino, Marcelo, 22	Dec 18	1996	São Paulo	Brazil	3	2	F	Committed suicide	
Campos Beroíza, Florinia Yolanda, 19	Nov 17	1978	Los Ángeles	Chile	3	1	M	Sentenced to 20 years' imprisonment	
Jensen, Derek, 21	Dec 15	2011	Claresholm, Alberta	Canada	3	1	F	Committed suicide	
Santángelo, Ariel, 43	March 1	2017	Banfield	Argentina	3	1	F	Committed suicide	
Wood, Derek, 18 Muise, Darren, 18 MacNeil, Daniel, 23	May 7	1992	Sydney River, Nova Scotia	Canada	3	1	F M	All sentenced to life imprisonment	
Galaviz, Gabriel Alejandro, 20	March 6	2024	Guadalajara	Mexico	3	1	M	Later died by suicide while awaiting trial	
Uribe Obando, Francisco Javier	March 24–25	2024	Río Bueno	Chile	3	1	M	Sentenced to life imprisonment Also terminated a pregnancy	
Garavito Cubillos, Luis Alfredo, 41	June 19–20	1998	Génova	Colombia	3	0	M	Sentenced to 1,853 years and 9 days in prison for 142 total murders Died in prison in 2023	
Arancibia Navarro, Iván Jesus, 47	Dec 17	1999	Valparaíso	Chile	3	0	F	Also attempted suicide. Found not guilty by reason of insanity.	
Hurtado Valencia, Cristian Camilo, 40	Mar 24	2026	Bogotá	Colombia	3	0	F	Also attempted suicide. sentenced to 24 years in prison.	
Claudio Henrique da Silva, 33	Aug 1	2026	São Paulo	Brazil	3	0	M	Committed suicide	
Juan de Dios Velaztiqui, 76	Dec 29	2000	Buenos Aires	Argentina	3	0	F	Sentenced to life imprisonment	

== Familicides ==
The victims must have been largely the relatives of the perpetrator to be considered a familicide.

Perpetrator	Date	Year	Location	Country	Killed	Injured	W	Additional Notes	Ref.
Unknown*	February	1928	Sousa	Brazil	14	0	P		
Medana, Jose*	May	1891	Lomas de Zamora	Argentina	13	0			
Ramis de Araujo, Sidnei, 46	Dec 31	2016	Campinas	Brazil	12	3	F	Committed suicide	
Torres, Benito, 25*	Sep 20	1938	Palma Soriano	Cuba	10	1	FMA	Committed suicide	
Chahal, Mark Vijay, 30	April 5	1996	Vernon, British Columbia	Canada	9	2	F	Committed suicide	
Alvarez, Antonio*	Dec 1	1923	Puebla	Mexico	9	0	M	Committed suicide	
Silva, Maximiliano*	April	1943	Alegrete	Brazil	9	0		Committed suicide	
Sovereign, Henry*	Jan 21	1832	Norfolk County, Upper Canada	(United Kingdom) British North America	8	0	MO	Sentenced to death and executed	
Banks y Keena, Mateo, 49	April 18	1922	Azul	Argentina	8	0	F	Sentenced to life imprisonment	
Day, Andrew, 40*	Dec 16	1929	Trois-Rivières, Quebec	Canada	8	0	M	Found mentally unfit to stand trial	
Lam, Phu, 53*	Dec 29	2014	Edmonton, Alberta	Canada	8	0	F	Committed suicide	
Unknown*	March	1961	Cerro Azul	Brazil	7	3	P	Committed suicide	
Herod, Raul, 36*	July 7	1999	Buxton	Guyana	7	1	F A	Committed suicide	
Pinto, Domingos Amorim	Jan 28	2000	São Gonçalo, Rio de Janeiro	Brazil	7	1	F	Committed suicide	
Laventure, Mathilde, 33*	July 20/21	1862	Saint-Eusèbe-de-Stanfold, Canada East	Canada	7	0	M	Committed suicide	
Lavera, Carmen, 34*	Oct 31	1918	Camagüey	Cuba	7	0		Killed numerous animals	
Loweree, Elfren*	March 15	1926	Chihuahua	Mexico	7	0	M	Committed suicide	
Jose de Souza, Apollinario		1932	Rincão do Ferraz	Brazil	7	0	M	Committed suicide	
Hreczkosy, Thomas, 28*	Jan 29	1932	Elma, Manitoba	Canada	7	0	MA	Sentenced to death, later changed to life imprisonment	
Clark, John Etter, 41	June 3	1956	Erskine, Alberta	Canada	7	0	F	Committed suicide	
Cook, Robert Raymond, 22*	June 25	1959	Stettler, Alberta	Canada	7	0	FM	Sentenced to death and executed	
Ramirez Camacho, José Rosario*	June	1962	Las Comitas	Mexico	7	0	M	Sentenced to 37 years in prison	
Sandoval Troncoso, Luis Avelino*, 43	July 15	1963	Rio Bueno	Chile	7	0	MP	Committed suicide	
Hogue, Leonard Raymond, 34	April 20	1965	Coquitlam, British Columbia	Canada	7	0	F	Committed suicide	
de Oliveira, José Valdir, 52*	Oct 30	2000	São Paulo	Brazil	7	0	MA	Committed suicide	
Bilodeau, Jean Rosaire, 45	Oct 25	1934	Quebec City, Quebec	Canada	6	2	F	Sentenced to death and executed	
Macloud, Luis Antonio, 45^	Nov	1991	Panama City	Panama	6	1	F	Committed suicide	
Swift Runner		1878	Near Fort Saskatchewan, Alberta	Canada	6	0	FM	Sentenced to death and executed	
McGee, Minnie*	April	1912	Georgetown, Prince Edward Island	Canada	6	0	P	Sentenced to death, later commuted to life imprisonment	
Basora Montejo, Santiago, 38*	April 24	1932	Güines	Cuba	6	0	MA	Committed suicide	
Ingunza, Juan, 46*	Jan 1	1964	Pucallpa	Peru	6	0		Committed suicide	
Kosberg, Thomas Gordon, 17*	Dec 10	1965	Vancouver, British Columbia	Canada	6	0	MP	Found not guilty by reason of insanity	
Emidio da Silva, José*	March 7	1972	Cruzeta	Brazil	6	0	M	Sentenced to 30 years in prison	
Haripaul, Devakaparsaud, 32*	May 29	1980	Leonora	Guyana	6	0	M	Committed suicide	
Blackman, Bruce Alfred, 22*	Jan 18	1983	Coquitlam, British Columbia	Canada	6	0	FM	Found not guilty by reason of insanity	
Ricardo da Costa, Sebastião, 54	Feb 19	2001	Itajuípe	Brazil	6	0	M	Committed suicide	
Bauer, John, 51	Sep 18–20	2001	Kirkland and Notre-Dame-de-Grâce, Montreal, Quebec	Canada	6	0	F A	Committed suicide	
Handel, Jay, 45*	March 11	2002	Quatsino, British Columbia	Canada	6	0	FMA	Sentenced to life imprisonment	
da Silva, Edson, 33*	May 2	2014	Coronel Sapucaia	Brazil	6	0	MA	Sentenced to 135 years in prison	
Young, Thomas, 27	December 25	1958	Ear Falls, Ontario	Canada	5	0	F M	Sentenced to death and executed	
Rodríguez Llancapán, Juan Desiderio, 29	May 25	2013	Carahue	Chile	5	0	M	Sentenced to life imprisonment	
Huaripata Rosales, Juan	Dec 12	2019	El Agustino	Peru	4	1	M	Sentenced to life imprisonment	
Barreda, Ricardo Alberto, 56*	Nov 15	1992	La Plata	Argentina	4	0	F	Sentenced to life imprisonment. Paroled in 2011.	
Díaz Balbín, Ángel	Nov 17	1976	Breña	Peru	3	0	M	Sentenced to 15 years in prison. Murdered by psychologist Mario Poggi during interrogation for serial murders in 1986	
Valdés Quiroga, Miguel Ángel	Aug 19	2001	Santiago	Chile	3	0	M	Sentenced to life imprisonment	
Franklin, Wilgo Charles, 53	March 19	2012	Puljhunweg	Suriname	3	0	M	Sentenced to life in prison	
14-year-old boy*	July 1	2025	Itaperuna	Brazil	3	0	F	Arrested	

== Abbreviations and footnotes ==
* – Marks cases where all the victims were relatives of the perpetrator

W – A basic description of the weapons used in the murders

F – Firearms and other ranged weapons, especially rifles and handguns, but also bows and crossbows, grenade launchers, flamethrowers, or slingshots
M – Melee weapons, like knives, swords, spears, machetes, axes, clubs, rods, stones, or bare hands
O – Any other weapons, such as bombs, hand grenades, Molotov cocktails, poison and poisonous gas, as well as vehicle and arson attacks

A – indicates that an arson attack was the only other weapon used
V – indicates that a vehicle was the only other weapon used
E – indicates that explosives of any sort were the only other weapon used
P – indicates that an anaesthetising or deadly substance of any kind was the only other weapon used (includes poisonous gas)
