= List of mass shootings in Canada =

This is a list of mass shooting and shooting sprees in Canada. Shootings with four or more victims are included on this list, excluding perpetrators.

== 20th century ==
Date	Location	Region	Dead	Injured	Total
October 10, 1902	Altona	Manitoba	3 (Note: Including the perpetrator)	5	8
July 4, 1912	Dawson City	Yukon	5	0	5
April 1, 1918	Quebec City	Quebec	4	100 (Note: Approximative number, sources varies from as low to 30 to as high to 150, some caused by objects thrown)	104
June 20, 1918	Grande Prairie	Alberta	6	0	6
July 9, 1928	Mannville	Alberta	4	0	4
October 22, 1930	Smoky Lake	Alberta	5	0	5
October 25, 1934	Quebec City	Quebec	6	2	8
June 18, 1949	Sudbury	Ontario	4	5	9
August 1949	Makinak	Manitoba	5	0	5
September 21, 1951	Shawinigan	Quebec	1	3	4
November 15, 1952	Toronto	Ontario	0	4	4
August 30, 1955	Fenwood	Saskatchewan	5	0	5
June 3, 1956	Erskine	Alberta	7	0	7
December 25, 1958	Ear Falls	Ontario	5	0	5
March 16, 1959	Edmonton	Alberta	1	5	6
June 25, 1959	Stettler	Alberta	7	0	7
September 13, 1959	York	Ontario	2	4	6
May 7, 1960	Oshawa	Ontario	2	3	5
September 12, 1960	Ottawa	Ontario	4	1	5
May 23, 1962	Sainte-Scholastique	Quebec	1	4	5
November 21, 1962	Berwick	Nova Scotia	4	0	4
December 22, 1963	Ottawa	Ontario	4	0	4
April 20, 1965	Coquitlam	British Columbia	8	0	8
June 25, 1966	Ford City	Ontario	2	2	4
August 15, 1967	Shell Lake	Saskatchewan	9	0	9
January 26, 1968	Montreal	Quebec	0	5	5
November 27, 1969	Toronto/Bolton	Ontario	5	0	5
February 8, 1970	Edmonton	Alberta	5	0	5
September 5, 1970	Creston	British Columbia	8	0	8
February 26, 1971	Thamesville	Ontario	4	0	4
April 22, 1972	Nanaimo	British Columbia	0	4	4
June 25, 1972	Montreal	Quebec	4	1	5
August 28, 1972	Kettle Valley	British Columbia	6	3	9
January 7, 1973	Owen Sound	Ontario	4	0	4
September 1974	Umpherville	Manitoba	4	0	4
December 20, 1974	Calgary	Alberta	2	7	9
May 28, 1975	Brampton	Ontario	3	13	16
September 6, 1975	Winnipeg	Manitoba	0	5	5
October 16, 1975	Montreal	Quebec	4	0	4
October 27, 1975	Ottawa	Ontario	3	5	8
September 4, 1976	Toronto	Ontario	1	5	6
March 12, 1977	Montreal	Quebec	5	3	8
February 1, 1980	Fredericton	New Brunswick	0	4	4
August 1, 1980	Montreal	Quebec	0	4	4
September 19, 1980	Vancouver/Richmond	British Columbia	4	1	5
August 2, 1981	Vancouver	British Columbia	3	1	4
August 10-17, 1982	Wells Gray Provincial Park	British Columbia	6	0	6
November 14, 1982	Etobicoke	Ontario	5	0	5
January 18, 1983	Vancouver	British Columbia	6	0	6
May 8, 1984	Quebec City	Quebec	3	13	16
March 24, 1985	Sherbrooke	Quebec	5	0	5
March 24, 1985	Toronto	Ontario	5	0	5
December 21, 1986	Vancouver	British Columbia	1	3	4
July 1, 1987	Fredericton	New Brunswick	2	4	6
March 26, 1988	Edson	Alberta	0	4	4
July 29, 1988	Calgary	Alberta	4	1	5
May 28, 1989	Dundas	Ontario	0	6	6
December 6, 1989	Montreal	Quebec	15	14	29
October 28, 1990	Montreal	Quebec	0	7	7
February 3, 1991	Toronto	Ontario	1	3	4
March 3, 1991	Toronto	Ontario	3	2	5
April 14, 1991	Montreal	Quebec	5	1	6
May 7, 1992	Sydney River	Nova Scotia	3	1	4
August 24, 1992	Montreal	Quebec	4	1	5
January 17, 1993	Toronto	Ontario	1	3	4
September 14, 1994	Oshawa	Ontario	1	3	4
April 5, 1996	Vernon	British Columbia	10	2	12
October 5, 1997	Pickering	Ontario	0	5	5
April 6, 1999	Ottawa	Ontario	5	2	7

== 21st century ==
Date	Location	Region	Dead	Injured	Total
September 18–20, 2001	Montreal	Quebec	7	0	7
March 11, 2002	Quatsino	British Columbia	6 (Note: 4 by gunfire)	0	6
June 15, 2002	Grimsby	Ontario	5	0	5
March 3, 2005	Mayerthorpe	Alberta	5	0	5
May 15, 2005	Edmonton	Alberta	1	4	5
December 26, 2005	Toronto	Ontario	1	6	7
April 8, 2006	Elgin County	Ontario	8	1	9
September 13, 2006	Montreal	Quebec	2	19	21
January 6, 2007	Cambridge Bay	Nunavut	3	2	5
October 19, 2007	Surrey	British Columbia	6	0	6
July 26, 2009	Smith	Alberta	4	0	4
March 18, 2010	Montreal	Quebec	2	2	4
August 25, 2010	Toronto	Ontario	0	4	4
December 12, 2010	Vancouver	British Columbia	0	10	10
June 7, 2011	Iqaluit	Nunavut	4	0	4
August 14, 2011	Kelowna	British Columbia	1	4	5
December 15, 2011	Claresholm	Alberta	4	1	5
June 2, 2012	Toronto	Ontario	2	5	7
June 15, 2012	Edmonton	Alberta	3	1	4
July 1, 2012	Calgary	Alberta	1	3	4
July 16, 2012	Toronto	Ontario	2	24 (Note: Including the two perpetrators)	26
February 21, 2013	Whitby	Ontario	0	5	5
September 22, 2013	Toronto	Ontario	0	5	5
April 30, 2014	Nanaimo	British Columbia	2	2	4
May 30, 2014	Toronto	Ontario	0	4	4
June 4–6, 2014	Moncton	New Brunswick	3	2	5
October 22, 2014	Ottawa	Ontario	2	3	5
December 29, 2014	Edmonton	Alberta	9	0	9
January 1, 2015	Calgary	Alberta	1	6	7
April 16, 2015	Toronto	Ontario	0	5	5
August 4, 2015	Toronto	Ontario	2	3	5
January 22, 2016	La Loche	Saskatchewan	5	6	11
January 31, 2016	Toronto	Ontario	2	3	5
March 11, 2016	Cochrane	Alberta	0	4	4
April 16, 2016	Hamilton	Ontario	4	0	4
April 23, 2016	Mississauga	Ontario	1	3	4
January 3, 2017	Guysborough County	Nova Scotia	4	0	4
January 29, 2017	Quebec City	Quebec	6	5	11
July 10, 2017	Calgary	Alberta	4	0	4
July 23, 2017	Toronto	Ontario	0	5	5
July 31, 2017	Toronto	Ontario	1	4	5
September 3, 2017	Thorold	Ontario	0	5	5
January 19, 2018	Toronto	Ontario	2	2	4
February 25, 2018	Ryerson	Ontario	4	0	4
June 2, 2018	Pickering	Ontario	0	4	4
July 1, 2018	Toronto	Ontario	1	3	4
July 22, 2018	Toronto	Ontario	3	13	16
August 8, 2018	Hamilton	Ontario	1	3	4
August 10, 2018	Fredericton	New Brunswick	4	1	5
April 15, 2019	Penticton	British Columbia	4	0	4
June 17, 2019	Toronto	Ontario	0	4	4
August 24, 2019	Toronto	Ontario	0	4	4
January 31, 2020	Toronto	Ontario	3	2	5
April 18–19, 2020	Multiple	Nova Scotia	23	3	26
July 10, 2020	Toronto	Ontario	1	4	5
September 4, 2020	Oshawa	Ontario	5	1	6
April 6, 2021	O'Chiese First Nation	Alberta	0	4	4
May 29, 2021	Mississauga	Ontario	1	4	5
August 2, 2021	Montreal	Quebec	3	2	5
August 8, 2021	Toronto	Ontario	2	2	4
January 24, 2022	Vancouver	British Columbia	4	0	4
March 12, 2022	Edmonton	Alberta	1	6	7
June 28, 2022	Saanich	British Columbia	2	6	8
July 25, 2022	Langley	British Columbia	3	2	5
July 31, 2022	Bunibonibee Cree Nation	Manitoba	0	4	4
August 1, 2022	Ajax	Ontario	0	6	6
August 2-4, 2022	Montreal	Quebec	4	0	4
September 12, 2022	Mississauga/Milton	Ontario	4	2	6
December 18, 2022	Vaughan	Ontario	6	1	7
March 16, 2023	Edmonton	Alberta	3	1	4
June 10, 2023	Ottawa	Ontario	0	4	4
July 1, 2023	Mississauga	Ontario	0	4	4
September 2, 2023	Ottawa	Ontario	2	6	8
October 23, 2023	Sault Ste. Marie	Ontario	5	1	6
November 26, 2023	Winnipeg	Manitoba	5	0	5
February 22, 2024	White Rock	British Columbia	0	4	4
June 2, 2024	Toronto	Ontario	2	3	5
June, 21, 2024	Vaughan	Ontario	2	2	4
October 19, 2024	Brampton	Ontario	1	3	4
February 4, 2025	Carry the Kettle Nakoda Nation	Saskatchewan	4	0	4
March 7, 2025	Toronto	Ontario	0	12	12
June 3, 2025	Toronto	Ontario	1	5	6
December 30, 2025	Big Island Lake Cree Nation	Saskatchewan	1	3	4
February 10, 2026	Tumbler Ridge	British Columbia	9	27	36
June 22, 2026	Montreal	Quebec	3	2	5
July 11, 2026	Toronto	Ontario	2	5	7
October 29, 2026	Toronto	Ontario	0	5	5

== See also ==
- List of massacres in Canada
