= List of massacres in Canada =

This is a list of events in Canada and its predecessors that are commonly characterized as massacres. Massacre is defined in the Oxford English Dictionary as "the indiscriminate and brutal slaughter of people or (less commonly) animals; carnage, butchery, slaughter in numbers"; it also states that the term is used "in the names of certain massacres of history".

- For single perpetrator events and shooting sprees, see Lists of rampage killers and Category:Spree shootings in Canada
- For school shootings, see Category:School shootings in Canada and Category:School killings in Canada
- For North American First Nations massacres, see List of Indian massacres.
- For terrorism, see Terrorism in Canada.
- For serial killers, see List of serial killers in Canada.

== List ==
Name	Date	Location	Dead/Injured/ Captives	Mechanism of injury	Perpetrator suicide	Notes
Lachine massacre	August 5, 1689	Lachine, Quebec	24–250	Tomahawk, fire and other unspecified weapons	No	Part of King William's War
Massacre Island, Ontario	June 6, 1736	Lake of the Woods	21	Arrows and various edged weapons including knives	No	There is some dispute about which island in Lake of the Woods was the actual site of the massacre.
Battle at Port-la-Joye	July 11, 1746	Port-la-Joye, Île Saint-Jean. The location now known as Hillsborough River (Prince Edward Island).	34 / 0	Unknown	No	Acadian and Mi'kmaqs killed 34 unarmed British (27 soldiers and 7 sailors). Part of King George's War
Battle of Grand Pré	February 10, 1747	Grand-Pré, Nova Scotia	67 / 0 / 40	Flintlock muskets, bayonets and various close-quarters weapons	No	Acadian and Mi'kmaqs took est. 40 prisoners after attack. Part of King George's War
Raid on Dartmouth	May 13, 1751	Dartmouth, Nova Scotia	7–20 / 0 / 6–14	Miscellaneous including various edged weapons	No	One of seven raids by Mi'kmaqs on British and New England forces, usually very violent with deaths and scalpings. Part of Father Le Loutre's War
St. Francis Raid	October 4, 1759	Odanak, Quebec	30–200 / unk / 7–20	Military arms including muskets, bayonets and tomahawks	No	Raid by Robert Rogers' Rangers, which was pursued and depleted before crossing back into New England. Part of Seven Years' War
Bloody Falls massacre	July 17, 1771	The location now known as Kugluk/Bloody Falls Territorial Park near Kugluktuk, Nunavut	20	Various small arms including knives and other edged weapons	No	Alleged massacre of a group of Copper Inuit by Matonabbee and his accompanying party of Dene, witnessed by Samuel Hearne.
Chilcotin War	April 30, 1864	Bute Inlet, British Columbia	19	Firearms including rifles	No	Massacre of 14 employees of Alfred Waddington by various Tŝilhqot'in people who had been working on road construction without compensation for two years.
Cypress Hills Massacre	June 1, 1873	Cypress Hills, Saskatchewan	23 Official, Estimated 200	Firearm	No	Mass murder perpetrated by American bison and wolf hunters, and American and Canadian whisky traders and cargo haulers, against a camp of Assiniboine people. One of the main contributing reasons for the formation of the Royal Canadian Mounted Police.
Black Donnellys massacre	February 4, 1880	Lucan Biddulph, Ontario	5	Firearms, pitchfork, axe, shovel, clubs and a wooden stake	No	Murder of five members of the Donnelly family by an armed mob, after which their farm was burned down. The event was the culmination of long-standing conflict between the family and other residents. None of the mob were ever convicted.
Frog Lake Massacre	April 2, 1885	Frog Lake, Alberta	9	Firearms	No	Part of the North-West Rebellion
Mass shooting Smoky Lake, Alberta	October 22, 1930	Smoky Lake, Alberta	5	Firearms (shotgun)	No	Four members of the Walanski family and neighbour Wasyl Darichuk were killed. George Dwernychuk hanged March 3, 1931, Provincial Jail, Ft. Saskatchewan
Knights of Columbus Hostel fire	December 12, 1942	Knights of Columbus Hostel, St. John's, Newfoundland	99 / 109	Fire	No	99 civilians and military personnel perished in the Knights of Columbus Hostel fire in St. John's, Newfoundland. The fire was likely an incidence of enemy sabotage carried out by Nazi agents.
CPA Flight 108 bombing	September 9, 1949	Cap Tourmente, Quebec	23	dynamite time bomb	Failed attempt by one of the conspirators	Whole plane destroyed to kill one of the conspirators' wife (so he could marry his mistress) and obtain life insurance money.
Canadian Pacific Air Lines Flight 21	July 8, 1965	Cariboo, British Columbia	52	Bomb	Unknown	Unsolved airplane bombing.
Mount Pleasant axe slayings	December 10, 1965	Vancouver, British Columbia	6/0	Axe	No	Six members of the Kosberg family were killed with an axe after being sedated by their 17-year-old son, Thomas Gordon Kosberg.
Buffalo Narrows axe slayings	January 30, 1969	Buffalo Narrows, Saskatchewan	7 / 1	Axe	No	Seven members of the Pederson family were killed with an axe in their beds by a schizophrenic man, Frederick Moses McCallum.
Blue Bird Café fire	September 1, 1972	Montreal, Quebec	37	Fire	No	The Blue Bird Café fire was a nightclub fire on September 1, 1972, in Montreal, Quebec. In all, 37 people were killed as a result of arson.
Gargantua Nightclub Assassinations	January 21, 1975	Montreal, Quebec	13	Gunshots, Fire	No	Part of a gangland feud between West End Gang and Italian Mafia.
Lennoxville massacre	March 24, 1985	Lennoxville, Quebec	5	Firearm	No	Part of the Quebec Biker war, 4 convicted of first degree murder
École Polytechnique massacre	December 6, 1989	Montreal, Quebec	15 (including the perpetrator) / 14	Firearm	Yes	Marc Lépine killed 14 women and injured 14 others (10 women and 4 men), before taking his own life. The attack lasted for 20 minutes and was the deadliest mass shooting in Canadian history at the time.
Concordia University massacre	August 24, 1992	Montreal, Quebec	4 / 1	Firearm	No	School shooting. 4 killed, 1 injured.
Giant Mine Murders (Royal Oak Mines Labour Dispute)	September 18, 1992	Yellowknife, Northwest Territories	9	Bombing	No	Bombing during labour dispute. One of Canada's deadliest mass murders.
Vernon massacre	April 6, 1996	Vernon, British Columbia	9 / 2	Multiple firearms	Yes	Estranged husband murdered wedding party.
Shedden massacre	April 8, 2006	Shedden, Ontario	8	Multiple firearms	No	Gang killing of own gang members.
2014 Edmonton shooting	December 29, 2014	Edmonton, Alberta	9 (including the perpetrator)	Firearm	Yes	53-year-old Phu Lam murders his ex-wife and six relatives on December 29, the worst mass murder in Edmonton's history
2014 Calgary stabbing	April 15, 2014	Calgary, Alberta	5	Knife	No	Five people stabbed to death at a house party by Matthew de Grood during a psychotic episode.
Quebec City mosque shooting	January 29, 2017	Quebec City, Quebec	6 / 19	Multiple firearms	No	Islamophobic attack on the Islamic Cultural Centre of Quebec City by Alexandre Bissonnette. Ultimately, charges of terrorism were not brought forth as Bissonnette had acted independently of a terrorist organization.
Toronto van attack	April 23, 2018	Toronto, Ontario	11 / 15	Vehicle	No	A van was driven along a Yonge Street sidewalk on April 23, 2018, by Alek Minassian. At least 26 were injured, including 11 fatally.
2020 Nova Scotia attacks	April 18, 2020	Multiple locations, Nova Scotia	23 (including the perpetrator) / 3	Multiple firearms, fire	No	Perpetrator Gabriel Wortman committed multiple shootings using illegal firearms and set fires at 16 locations in Nova Scotia, killing 13 with firearms and 9 in fires (22 people total) and injuring three others over span of two days before the Royal Canadian Mounted Police (RCMP) shot and killed him in Enfield, NS. It is the deadliest shooting in Canadian history.
London, Ontario truck attack	June 6, 2021	London, Ontario	4 / 1	Vehicle	No	A terrorist attack occurred on June 6, 2021, when a vehicle was used to strike a Muslim family at the intersection of Hyde Park and South Carriage roads, south of Gainsborough Road. The suspect is 20-year-old London resident Nathaniel Veltman. Four died, one was injured.
2022 Saskatchewan stabbings	September 4, 2022	James Smith Cree Nation and Weldon, Saskatchewan	12 (including the perpetrator) / 18	Multiple knives	Yes	On September 4, 2022, 28 people were stabbed, ten of whom were killed, in at least thirteen locations in the James Smith Cree Nation and Weldon, Saskatchewan, Canada. One suspect, Damien Sanderson, who was later reclassified as a victim, was found dead near one of the stabbing locations on September 5, 2022. The perpetrator, Myles Sanderson, was apprehended on September 7, 2022, near Rosthern, Saskatchewan and died later from overdosing on cocaine.
2022 Vaughan shooting	December 18, 2022	Vaughan, Ontario	6 (including the perpetrator) / 1	Firearm	No	On December 18, 2022, a mass shooting occurred at the Bellaria Residences condominium tower in Vaughan, a suburb north of Toronto, Ontario, Canada. Six people were killed, including the gunman, 73-year-old Francesco Villi, who was shot and killed by responding police officers. Another person was hospitalized with serious but non-life-threatening injuries.
2024 Ottawa stabbing	March 6, 2024	Ottawa, Ontario	6 / 1	'Knife-like' edged weapon	No	On March 6, 2024, six people were stabbed to death and one was injured in the Barrhaven suburb of Ottawa.
2025 Vancouver car attack	April 26, 2025	Vancouver, British Columbia	11 / 32+	Vehicle	No	On April 26, a car was driven into a crowd at Lapu-Lapu day, an annual festival for Filipino Canadians in Vancouver.
2026 Tumbler Ridge shooting	February 10, 2026	Tumbler Ridge, British Columbia	9 (including the peretrator) / 27	Mass shooting	Yes	School shooting at Tumbler Ridge Secondary School.

== Sources ==
- Richter, Daniel K. (1992). The Ordeal of the Longhouse: The Peoples of the Iroquois League in the Era of European Colonization. UNC Press Books. ISBN 978-0-8078-6791-4. JSTOR 10.5149/9780807867914_richter.
