= Sitar family murders =

1932 mass murder in Elma, Manitoba

- Location: Elma, Manitoba, Canada
- Date: January 29, 1932; 94 years ago
- Attack type: Mass murder by stabbing, familicide, arson
- Weapons: Axe, knife
- Victims: Martin Sitar (55) (Note: Some sources say 64, sources that refer to him as Macko are incorrect); Josephine Sitar (32) (Note: Some sources falsely refer to her as Sophia); Frank Sitar (20); Walter Sitar (11); Bert Sitar (10); Jennie Sitar (7); Paul Sitar (4)
- Perpetrator: Tom Hreczkosy (Note: Sources vary in the name (Hrechkoski, Hrechkosie, Hrechkoise, Hrechkozie) however according to his court records this is the correct spelling) (28)
- Motive: Claimed that the devil commanded him to kill the family
- Verdict: Guilty
- Convictions: Murder
- Sentence: Death; commuted to life imprisonment in an asylum

On January 29, 1932, in Elma, Manitoba, seven members of the Sitar family were murdered in their sleep and their house set on fire by their 28 year-old farmhand, Tom Hreczkosy. It remains one of the worst cases of mass murder in Manitoba history.

== Background ==
Martin Sitar immigrated from Poland to Canada in 1900, and followed his brothers to live in eastern Manitoba, where he lived as the neighbour to his brother John. Josephine was his third wife, and Martin had fathered a total of ten children, including five who were adults when the massacre occurred. The family's farm was a very successful venture, largely due to Martin's relentless attitude, and they were the first family in the area to own a steam engine and a thresher. A year and a half prior to the massacre, Tom, Martin's nephew, was hired as a farmhand.

== Events ==
In the early morning of January 29, Hreczkosy used an axe and a large knife to slay the Sitar family, likely starting with Frank, the eldest of the children, who slept next to Tom in the loft of the house. All of the victims were attacked while sleeping in their beds, having their heads hacked at using the axe. Hreczkosy then set the house on fire, and boarded the door shut with large pieces of wood before fleeing into the forest. The crime was discovered not long after when John Sitar, Martin's brother and neighbour noticed the house in flames, and with the help of two other neighbours, used axes to hack away at the door before dragging Paul, Jennie, and Josephine from the house. All of them were badly burnt and wounded, with Josephine dying within minutes, and Jennie dying an hour later. Paul, the youngest, remained in a semi-conscious state and was taken to the St. Boniface Hospital in Winnipeg. Tom was initially believed to have also died in the fire, but this was found to be incorrect when only four more bodies were found in the ruins. Soon after, a train from Winnipeg was sent carrying a RCMP posse to search for the killer, later narrowing their search to looking for Tom. Tom evaded capture for five days during subzero weather, causing speculation that he may have died from the elements. During the search, another man called Waswe Terwerdochlly by the Montreal Gazette, was held in connection the murders, although his relation to the family was not elaborated on. On February 2, Hreczkosy was discovered 18 kilometres (11 mi) west of Elma in a locality known as Contour.

== Trial ==
The trial was held on March 23 in the Court of King's Bench of Manitoba. The trial was only for the murder of Martin Sitar, and Hreczkosy was not called as a witness. The trial featured psychiatrist Dr. A. T. Mathers as a witness under request of the crown. Following interviews with Hreczkosy, Mathers stated the he did not believe that Hreczkosy was mentally fit. A letter written by Hreczkosy from prison to a relative in Poland was also shown as evidence, in which he confessed to the crimes. After 17 hours of deliberation, the jury found Hreczkosy guilty, sentencing him to death. However, 5 days prior to his arranged execution on June 7, his sentence was commuted to a life sentence in an asylum.

== Perpetrator ==
Little is known about Tom Hreczkosy's life. He immigrated from Poland, likely from the south, and soon came to work on his uncle's farm as a labourer. During his interviews with Dr. A. T. Mathers, Tom said that he had been visited by the devil on Christmas Day, as well as multiple times since then. He also said that the day prior to the massacre, the devil came in the form of a black fly, who told him to kill the family, and gave him exact instructions. In his letter to his relatives from jail, Hreczkosy stated that he did not know why he did it, and that his relatives should not feel bad for him. Hreczkosy died in 1960.

== See also ==
- Shell Lake murders - Canadian familicide also caused by delusions
- Robert Raymond Cook - Another Canadian familicide of a family of seven
- Vernon Booher - Canadian mass murderer who was executed only three years earlier
- Langside Street massacre - another Canadian mass shooting that also occurred in Manitoba in 2023
