= 2022 Langley shootings =

Multiple homicide in Canada

- Shooting locations in the City of Langley and Township of Langley
- Location: City of Langley, British Columbia, Canada; Langley Township, British Columbia, Canada
- Date: July 25, 2022 (PDT)
- Target: Homeless people
- Attack type: Spree shooting; Shootout; Mass shooting
- Weapon: Glock semi-automatic pistol
- Deaths: 3 (including the perpetrator)
- Injuries: 2
- Victims: Paul David Wynn (aged 60); Steven Furness (aged 43)
- Perpetrator: Jordan Daniel Goggin (aged 28)
- Motive: Under investigation

On July 25, 2022, multiple shootings occurred in the City of Langley and Township of Langley in British Columbia, Canada. Two people were killed in the shootings, and two others were injured. The shooter, who was known to police, was later located near the Willowbrook Shopping Centre and killed in a shootout with Langley Royal Canadian Mounted Police (RCMP) and the Lower Mainland Emergency Response Team.

== Shootings ==
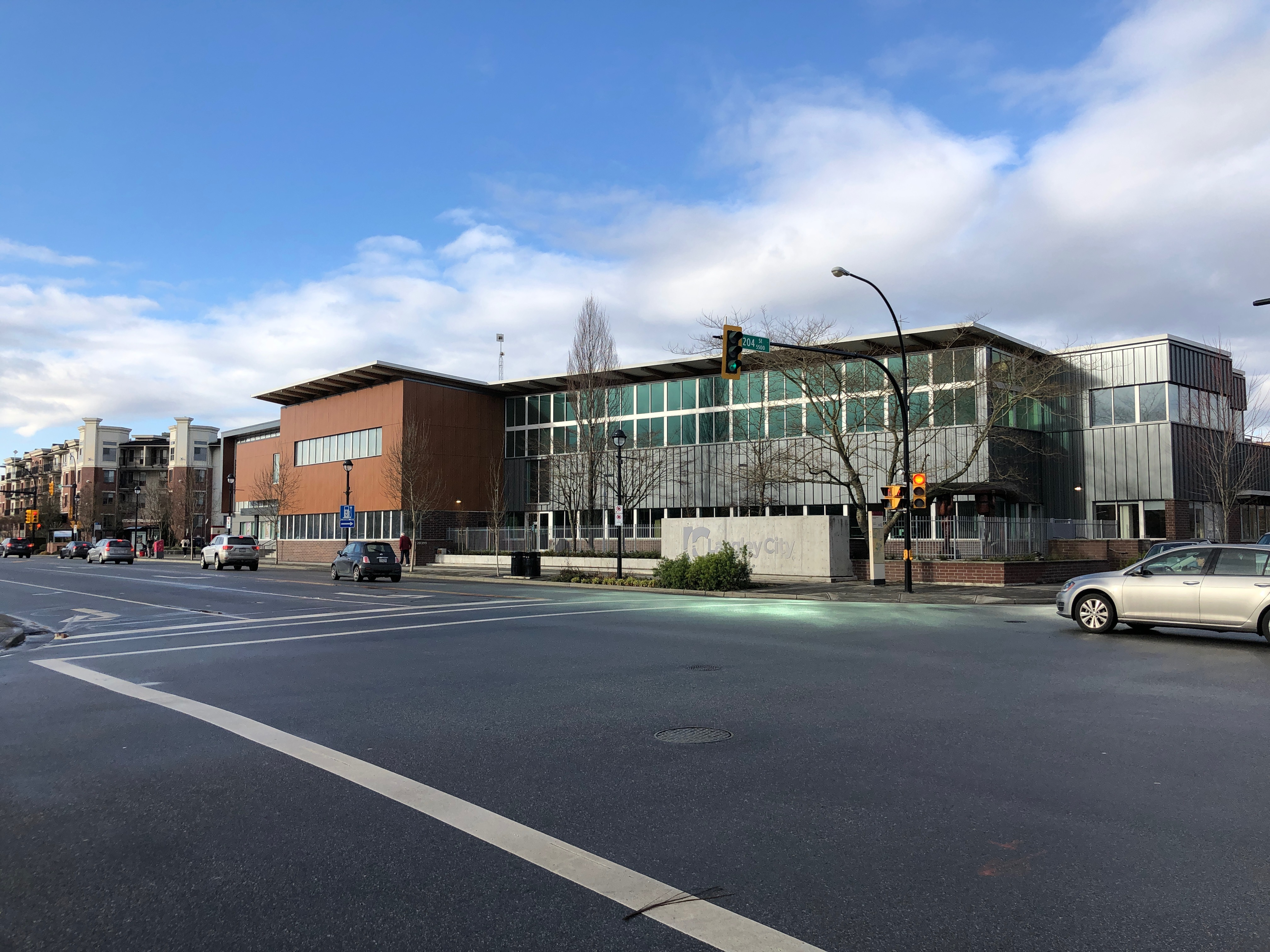
Langley City Hall, near to the first shooting

A Lower Mainland-wide emergency cellphone alert was issued at 6:20 a.m. PDT announcing that multiple shootings had taken place in Downtown Langley, and that one shooting was also reported in the adjacent Langley Township. The alert also mentioned that the police were looking for a dark-haired white man wearing brown Carhartt overalls (mistakenly called "coveralls" in the alert) and a blue and green camouflage shirt with a red logo on the right sleeve.

According to British Columbia RCMP, the shooting spree began at midnight on July 25 in the parking lot of Cascades Casino on Fraser Highway, where an injured woman was found in critical condition. At 3:00 a.m. a man was killed at a supportive housing site at 200 Street and 64 Avenue. The shooter proceeded to the Langley bus loop at Logan Avenue and Glover Road, and fatally shot a second man at around 5:00 a.m. Around 5:45 a.m. the perpetrator drove to the Langley Bypass, near the Willowbrook Shopping Centre, in a white car. While there, he wounded another man by shooting him in the leg. Shortly before 7:20 a.m., the perpetrator died in a shootout with the police at the same location. He was subsequently identified as 28-year-old Jordan Daniel Goggin from Surrey, British Columbia. Three of the victims were homeless.

Another emergency alert was sent at 7:20 a.m. cautioning residents to avoid the downtown core of Langley as authorities investigated whether or not there were more shooters.

== Victims ==
The two deceased victims were Paul David Wynn, age 60, and Steven Furness, age 43. On July 26, 2022, an informal vigil was held for the victims, and was attended by 100 people. Another vigil for the deceased victims was held on August 3, 2022, at the Innes Corners Plaza on the northwest corner of 204 Street and Fraser Highway.

The two wounded victims, a 26-year-old woman and man, were treated for their injuries in the hospital.

== Perpetrator ==
The perpetrator of the shootings was Jordan Daniel Goggin (1993/1994 – July 25, 2022), a 28-year-old resident of Surrey, British Columbia, a city west of Langley. He was known to the police, but not criminally. Goggin had no criminal record in British Columbia prior to the shooting, but was the defendant of a lawsuit in Cloverdale. The lawsuit, which was launched in November 2020, was filed by a woman who was injured in a Delta car crash caused by Goggin on September 15, 2018. The lawsuit was set to go to trial by February 2023.

== Response ==
In a CBC opinion piece on 31 July, former Manitoba minister for health Sharon Blady suggested the shootings were inspired by claims made by American podcaster Joe Rogan about shooting homeless people.

At a vigil for the victims on 3 August, a spokesperson for the homeless advocacy group Kimz Angels advocated for more safe housing for people experiencing homelessness. The mayor of Langley city, Val van den Broek, said “People shouldn’t be living on the streets like animals. It's so wrong.”

== See also ==
- 2022 Saanich shootout, British Columbia event that occurred a month earlier
