= Nova Scotia killings =

Nova Scotia killings may refer to:

- 2020 Nova Scotia attacks, a spree killing event
- Sydney River McDonald's murders, a robbery and triple homicide in 1992
- Dartmouth Massacre, a 1751 attack
- Grand-Pré Massacre, a 1747 attack
