= Mount Pleasant murders =

1965 mass murder in British Columbia, Canada

- Location: 142 East 22nd Avenue, Mount Pleasant, Vancouver, British Columbia, Canada
- Date: December 10, 1965; 1:00 a.m.
- Attack type: Mass stabbing, familicide
- Weapons: Double-bladed axe; Sleeping pills (used in sedation)
- Deaths: 6
- Perpetrator: Thomas Gordon Kosberg
- Verdict: Found not guilty by reason of insanity

On December 9-10, 1965, 17-year-old Thomas Kosberg sedated six members of his family and then killed them with a double-bladed axe at their home at 142 East 22nd Avenue in Mount Pleasant, Vancouver, British Columbia, Canada.

== Murders ==
On December 9, 1965, 17-year-old Thomas Gordon Kosberg purchased a bottle of 25 sleeping pills from a local drugstore in Vancouver. That evening, he prepared chocolate milkshakes laced with the sedatives for his parents, a family friend, and his younger siblings.

At 1:00 A.M. on December 10, shortly after the friend left and the family members fell asleep, Kosberg retrieved a double-bladed axe from the basement. He proceeded to attack his sleeping family, killing five of them instantly and critically injuring another.

=== Investigation ===
Police received a call at 7:45 A.M. from Bennet Wong, a psychiatrist in Vancouver, who had been treating Thomas prior to the murders. Thomas drove his father's 1954 sedan to Wong's home and confessed to the murders by telling Wong “I’ve done something awful.”

== Victims ==
- Osborne Helge Kosberg, 42
- Dorothy Kosberg, 40
- Barry Kosberg, 15
- Gayle Kosberg, 11
- Vincent Kosberg, 2
- Marianne Kosberg, 13; she initially survived the attack and underwent emergency surgery but succumbed to her head injuries nine days later.

The only unharmed survivor was 6-month-old Osborne Kosberg Jr., who was left untouched in his crib.

== Perpetrator ==
Thomas Gordon Kosberg (October 2, 1948 — January 1, 2016) had a documented history of severe mental illness and had previously been admitted to the Crease Clinic (later known as the Riverview Hospital) in 1961 at age 13.

=== Trial & institution ===
On February 16, 1967, a jury found him not guilty by reason of insanity on six counts of capital murder. Mr. Justice J. G. Ruttan ordered him to be held indefinitely at Riverview Hospital. He was released 12 years later, got married and worked at BC Children's Hospital for the next 30 years. He died in 2016.

== See also ==
- 1965 Coquitlam massacre
- 1969 Buffalo Narrows murders
