= Mike Rathje =

Canadian ice hockey player (born 1974)

- Born: May 11, 1974 (age 52) Mannville, Alberta, Canada
- Height: 6 ft 5 in (196 cm)
- Weight: 235 lb (107 kg; 16 st 11 lb)
- Position: Defence
- Shot: Left
- Played for: San Jose Sharks; Philadelphia Flyers
- NHL draft: 3rd overall, 1992; San Jose Sharks
- Playing career: 1993–2006

Michael Steven Rathje (born May 11, 1974) is a Canadian former professional ice hockey defenceman who played 13 seasons in the National Hockey League (NHL) for the San Jose Sharks and Philadelphia Flyers. Rathje was born in Mannville, Alberta, but grew up in Medicine Hat, Alberta.

== Playing career ==
Rathje was selected by the San Jose Sharks 3rd overall in the 1992 NHL entry draft and made his NHL debut during the 1993–94 season. After holding out for nearly half of the 2001–02 season, Rathje responded with a career year in the 2002–03 season as he played in all 82 games scoring career highs with 7 goals and 22 assists for 29 points. After spending his first eleven seasons with the Sharks, Rathje signed a five-year contract with the Philadelphia Flyers following the NHL lockout. Shortly into his second season with the Flyers, Rathje was placed on Long Term Injured Reserve (LTI) due to chronic back and hip problems. Rathje attempted to return to the Flyers lineup prior to the 2007–08 season, but was placed on LTI after training camp.

== Awards ==
- 1991–92: East Second All-Star Team (WHL)
- 1992–93: East Second All-Star Team (WHL)

== Career statistics ==
=== Regular season and playoffs ===
			Regular season					Playoffs
Season	Team	League	GP	G	A	Pts	PIM	GP	G	A	Pts	PIM
1989–90	Sherwood Park Crusaders	AJHL	33	6	11	17	30	6	1	1	2	2
1990–91	Medicine Hat Tigers	WHL	64	1	16	17	28	12	0	4	4	2
1991–92	Medicine Hat Tigers	WHL	67	11	23	34	109	4	0	1	1	2
1992–93	Medicine Hat Tigers	WHL	57	12	37	49	103	10	3	3	6	12
1992–93	Kansas City Blades	IHL	—	—	—	—	—	5	0	0	0	12
1993–94	Kansas City Blades	IHL	6	0	2	2	0	—	—	—	—	—
1993–94	San Jose Sharks	NHL	47	1	9	10	59	1	0	0	0	0
1994–95	Kansas City Blades	IHL	6	0	1	1	7	—	—	—	—	—
1994–95	San Jose Sharks	NHL	42	2	7	9	29	11	5	2	7	4
1995–96	Kansas City Blades	IHL	36	6	11	17	34	—	—	—	—	—
1995–96	San Jose Sharks	NHL	27	0	7	7	14	—	—	—	—	—
1996–97	San Jose Sharks	NHL	31	0	8	8	21	—	—	—	—	—
1997–98	San Jose Sharks	NHL	81	3	12	15	59	6	1	0	1	6
1998–99	San Jose Sharks	NHL	82	5	9	14	36	6	0	0	0	4
1999–2000	San Jose Sharks	NHL	66	2	14	16	31	12	1	3	4	8
2000–01	San Jose Sharks	NHL	81	0	11	11	48	6	0	1	1	4
2001–02	San Jose Sharks	NHL	52	5	12	17	48	12	1	3	4	6
2002–03	San Jose Sharks	NHL	82	7	22	29	48	—	—	—	—	—
2003–04	San Jose Sharks	NHL	80	2	17	19	46	17	1	5	6	13
2005–06	Philadelphia Flyers	NHL	79	3	21	24	46	6	0	0	0	6
2006–07	Philadelphia Flyers	NHL	18	0	1	1	6	—	—	—	—	—
NHL totals			768	30	150	180	491	77	9	14	23	51

=== International ===
Year	Team	Event	GP	G	A	Pts	PIM
1993	Canada	WJC	7	2	2	4	14

Preceded by Pat Falloon	San Jose Sharks first-round draft pick 1992	Succeeded by Andrei Nazarov
