= Handel family murders =

Familicide in British Colombia, Canada

- Location: Quatsino, British Columbia, Canada
- Date: March 11, 2002
- Attack type: Mass shooting; arson; mass murder; familicide
- Weapons: Rifle; bare hands; arson
- Deaths: 6
- Perpetrator: Jay Handel
- Motive: Desire to punish his at the time wife, Sonya, for seeking a divorce.

During the early morning of March 11, 2002, 45-year-old Jay Handel murdered his six children at their home in Quatsino, British Columbia, Canada. Handel strangled two of his children and shot the other four before setting the house on fire.

The case remains one of the worst mass murders in the province's history.

== Murders ==
Jay Handel, a former fish farm worker, bartender, and mail-courier driver, strangled his two youngest daughters, Ledia and Moriah, and shot the other four children with a rifle. After the killings, he set fire to the family home and three outbuildings with the children's bodies inside.

Handel then drove to pick up his estranged wife Sonya where she was staying with a neighbour after a weekend of domestic conflict. He brought her back to the property to make her witness the house engulfed in flames. While she was screaming, he attempted to slit his own throat with a utility knife in front of her but survived.

== Victims ==
- Sebastian, 11 (shot)
- Roxanne, 9 (shot)
- Martial, 7 (shot)
- Moriah, 6 (strangled)
- Levi, 4 (shot)
- Ledia, 2 (strangled)

== Trial and imprisonment ==
Handel testified in court that the murders were motivated by his desire to punish his wife for seeking a divorce.

In 2003, Handel received an automatic life sentence with no possibility of parole for 25 years. He will not be eligible to apply for parole until 2028.

== See also ==
- 1996 Vernon shooting
- 2001 Kirkland shootings
