= 2022 Saskatchewan stabbings =

Mass stabbing in Saskatchewan, Canada

- 2022 Saskatchewan stabbings (Saskatchewan) 2022 Saskatchewan stabbings (Canada)
- Location: James Smith Cree Nation and Weldon, Saskatchewan, Canada
- Date: September 4, 2022; 4 years ago 5:30 a.m. – 8:19 a.m. (UTC−06:00)
- Attack type: Mass stabbing, spree killing, mass murder, fratricide, home invasion, carjacking
- Weapons: Scissors; Kitchen knife
- Deaths: 12 (including the perpetrator and the perpetrator's brother)
- Injuries: 17
- Perpetrator: Myles Sanderson
- Motive: Unknown

On September 4, 2022, Myles Sanderson killed 11 and injured 17 people in a mass stabbing at 13 locations on the James Smith Cree Nation and in Weldon, Saskatchewan, Canada. Some of the victims are believed to have been targeted, while others were randomly attacked. It is the deadliest mass stabbing and one of the deadliest massacres in Canadian history.

Emergency alerts relating to the incidents were issued throughout the province of Saskatchewan and later extended to Manitoba and Alberta. Police quickly identified Myles and sought him and his brother Damien as suspects in the killing spree. On September 5, Damien was found dead with multiple wounds. At 3:28 p.m. on September 7, after his vehicle was PIT-manoeuvred off the road by police, Myles surrendered and was arrested in Rosthern, Saskatchewan; he entered medical distress shortly afterward, and died in police custody from acute cocaine overdose later that day. On October 6, the RCMP said there was evidence that Myles was solely responsible for all eleven homicides, including that of Damien. On April 27, 2023, the RCMP issued a preliminary timeline of events before, during and after the attack.

== Events ==
=== Prelude to the attacks ===
On September 1, 2022, Myles Sanderson arrived at the James Smith Cree Nation, a community within Saskatchewan of about 2,000 residents located 200 kilometres (120 mi) northeast of Saskatoon and 300 kilometres (190 mi) north of Regina, to sell cocaine. The next day, on the afternoon of September 2, Myles assaulted his partner and tried to run her over with their car. After the attack, Myles's brother Damien took him away. The brothers then picked up another woman, went to a bar in nearby Kinistino, and later returned to James Smith Cree Nation to sell cocaine again.

At 4:03 a.m. CST on September 3, the Royal Canadian Mounted Police (RCMP) received a call from Damien's wife, saying her husband had stolen a vehicle on the First Nation and might be impaired. Two officers responded at 4:15 and began looking for him, for he also had an outstanding arrest warrant at the time. At 5:35, they found the vehicle at a home, with Damien inside. Because he gave them a different name and looked different from a 2014 prison photo that they had, officers spent three hours looking Damien up, with no success.

Later, both Myles and Damien were picked up from the home at around noon and taken to the same Kinistino bar. They were dropped off at around 1:30 p.m. and then walked around for several hours before assaulting Gregory Burns, who would later be among the victims, at a home at 5:00 and then separated. Damien went to another Kinistino bar and told a woman that he and his brother had "a mission" and that "people would hear all about it in the next few hours." He returned to the James Smith Cree nation before midnight and met with Myles, who remained there. The brothers then assaulted another man, who did not suffer serious injuries.

At around 3:30 a.m. on September 4, the brothers took a gray van from a home on the First Nation and made their last known drug sale at 4:00. They returned to a home on the First Nation at 4:45 and left in the van. A witness later described them as drinking alcohol and "pumping themselves up for something."

=== Attacks ===
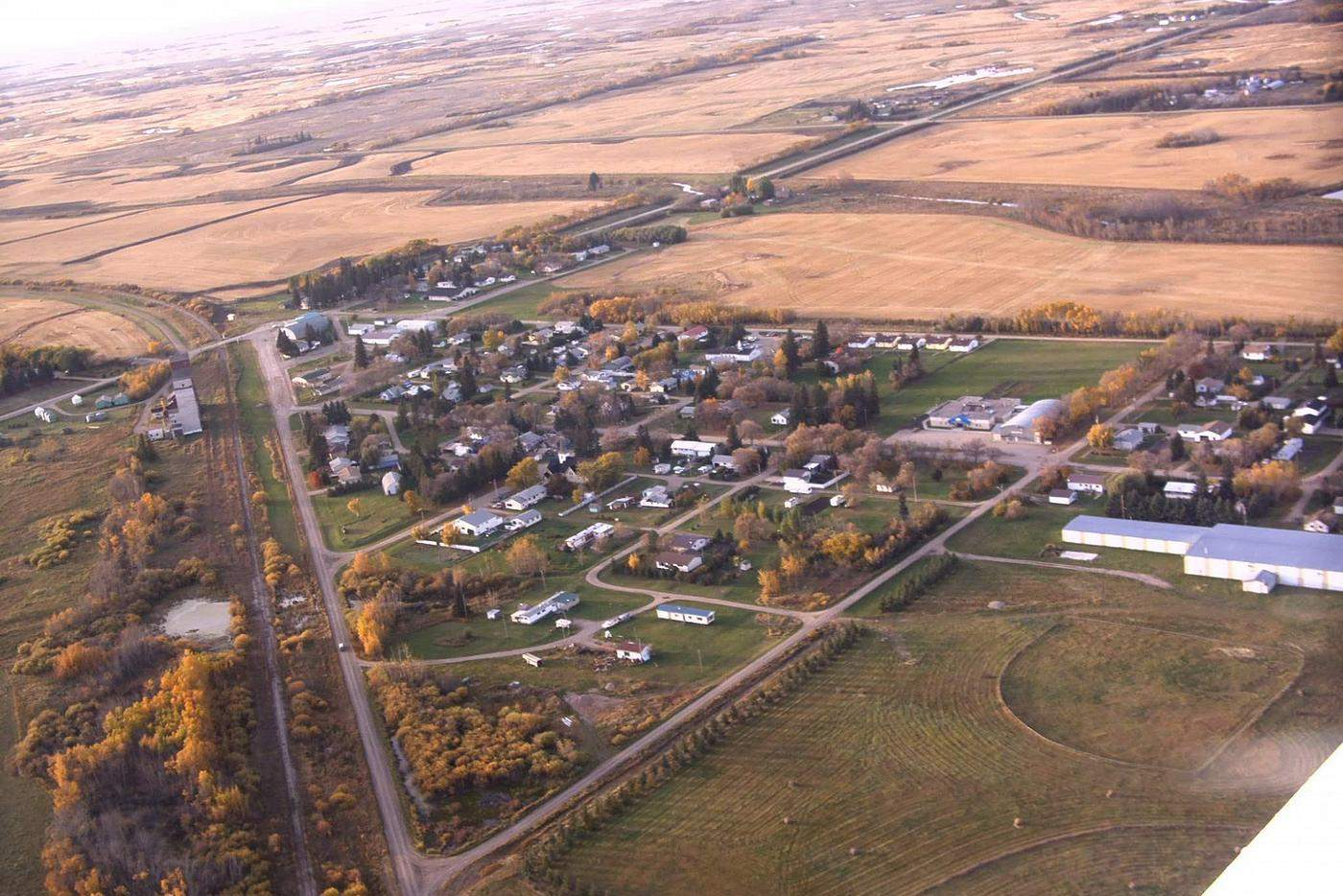
Weldon viewed from the southeast

According to a preliminary timeline released by the RCMP in April 2023, the attacks began at around 5:30 a.m. on September 4. At that time, the brothers entered into the house of Damien's wife, looking for her. When they could not find her, Damien told his two daughters who were in the home that they would not see him again. At around 5:40, the brothers entered another house, and Myles attacked a man with a pair of scissors. However, Damien stopped the attack when he stepped between the two and told the victim to not call the police. Myles took a knife from the kitchen, and the brothers left; the victim then called 9-1-1. Myles and Damien got into a fight in the van outside, which left Damien severely injured; he ran into nearby bushes, where he later died.

Between 5:59 and 6:07, Sanderson attacked five people, killing three in two homes. He then went to Gregory Burns's home, where he killed him and attacked Gregory's mother Bonnie and two children. At 6:14, Sanderson attacked two victims at another home. Five minutes later, Sanderson attacked his former father-in-law Earl Burns and his wife at a home before driving away. Earl tried to chase him down in a school bus, but it rolled into a ditch, after which he died. After attacking eight additional people in three other homes, killing two of them, Sanderson returned to Gregory Burns's home at 6:53 and attacked Bonnie Burns again, killing her. He also killed another woman who had gone to the home to help Bonnie. Throughout the attacks, Sanderson would steal a vehicle and abandon it for another one moments later.

Sanderson drove to Weldon, a village of 160 residents about 25 kilometres (16 mi), in a stolen SUV. Residents reported seeing him in the community and that a vehicle had been rummaged through, with a first aid kit and a crowbar stolen. At 8:19, Sanderson killed a man at a home in Weldon.

=== Police response ===
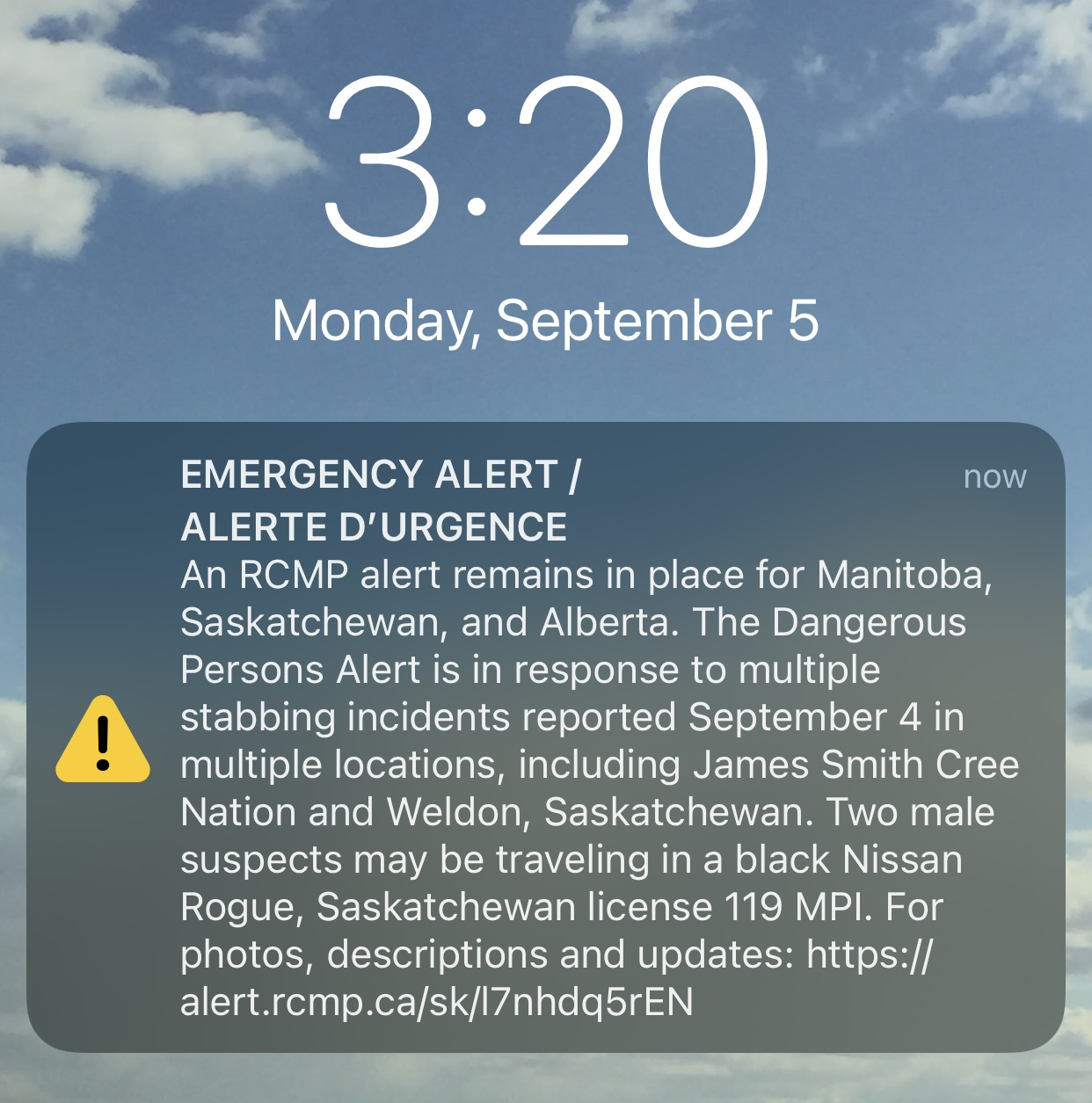
A screenshot of the emergency alert sent out during the manhunt, as it appeared on siOS devices

At 5:40, the RCMP was first notified of stabbings at multiple locations in the James Smith Cree Nation. At 5:43, two RCMP officers from Melfort were dispatched to the scene, and they arrived there at 6:18. Two minutes later, one of the officers left the crime scene to attend to a second scene, where he arrived at 6:32.

At 7:12, the RCMP issued an emergency alert within the immediate region, identifying Myles and Damien as suspects and advising residents to stay in secure locations and to use caution when allowing others into their homes. It also alerted citizens not to approach the brothers and instead report them to the emergency 9-1-1 call line.

At 8:20, the civil emergency was expanded to the entirety of Saskatchewan, after the brothers were found to have access to a vehicle. At the request of the Saskatchewan RCMP, the civil emergency was later expanded to the entirety of the neighbouring provinces Alberta and Manitoba. Police checkpoints were established between Regina and Prince Albert. The brothers' vehicle was later spotted in Regina at 11:45.

Dead and injured victims were located at 13 locations, with Myles' brother Damien misidentified as not being one of the victims but later confirmed to be despite police still issuing statements that further suspects were at large. STARS air ambulances and road ambulances were dispatched to triage and transport the wounded to hospitals. The Saskatchewan Health Authority initiated a code orange, briefly issuing additional staff in hospitals local to the stabbings to help with the influx of patients.

=== Sanderson's discovery, capture, and death ===
At 2:07 p.m. on September 7, a break-and-enter was reported in the town of Wakaw, and Sanderson was reportedly spotted northeast of the town, armed with a knife. An emergency alert was issued by the RCMP at 2:49, warning that a man armed with a knife was last seen in Wakaw, had stolen a white Chevrolet Avalanche, and was believed to be related to the attacks. The stolen truck was spotted at 3:17 by the driver of an unmarked police vehicle driving westbound on Highway 11 towards Rosthern, and a PIT manoeuvre was used to direct it into a ditch. The driver of the truck was identified as Sanderson, and he was apprehended by police at 3:28. He then entered medical distress at 3:33 and died in police custody later that day. On September 9, the original vehicle Sanderson was driving was found abandoned east of Crystal Springs. In February 2024, a forensic pathologist revealed that Sanderson died from an "acute cocaine overdose."

== Casualties ==
List of deaths

Victims:
- Damien Sanderson, 31
- Robert Sanderson, 49
- Christian Head, 54
- Lana Head, 49
- Gregory Burns, 28
- Earl Burns Sr., 66
- Thomas Burns, 23
- Carol Burns, 46
- Bonnie Goodvoice-Burns, 48
- Lydia Gloria Burns, 61
- Wesley Petterson, 78

Twelve people died, including the perpetrator. All were adults, aged between 23 and 78 years. A further 17 people were injured. As of September 7, ten were hospitalized, two in critical condition. Several of those killed were Myles' in-laws, two of whom he admitted stabbing in 2015.

== Perpetrator ==
Myles Brandon Sanderson, aged 32, was the perpetrator of the attack. RCMP initially identified him and his brother Damien as two suspects wanted in connection with the stabbings. They were believed to be driving a black Nissan Rogue, and were reportedly seen in Melfort and the Arcola Avenue area of Regina. On September 5, Myles was charged with first-degree murder, attempted murder, and breaking and entering in connection with the attacks, and Damien with first-degree murder. Damien was found dead the same day.

On October 6, the RCMP said Myles alone committed the killings, including that of Damien. They also said that Damien was involved in the initial planning and preparation for the stabbings but that something may have changed when the rampage commenced.

Police had been searching for Myles since May 2022, when he stopped meeting with his caseworker. He had been given statutory release in August 2021 after serving a five-year sentence for assault, robbery, mischief, and making threats. According to the Parole Board of Canada, Myles had 59 previous convictions, which included assaulting a police officer. In total, he had been charged with 125 crimes, according to the 47 cases filed against him in the province's criminal courts. Due to these, he had a lifetime ban from weapons, and was ordered to stay away from alcohol and other drugs. He used cocaine since he was 14, and had a history of rage and violence towards his partner, mainly under the influence of alcohol and/or other drugs.

== Reactions ==
At noon on September 4, the Joint Chiefs and Councils of the James Smith Cree Nation declared a local state of emergency, effective until 5:00 p.m. on September 30. Additionally, the community set up two emergency operations centres. The attacks occurred hours before the scheduled CFL football game between the Saskatchewan Roughriders and the Winnipeg Blue Bombers in Regina, part of the popular Labour Day Classic. Extra police were deployed to Mosaic Stadium in Regina during the game.

Queen Elizabeth II, in what would be her final public statement before her death the following day, said that she "mourn[s] with all Canadians at this tragic time". The premier of Saskatchewan, Scott Moe, said, "There are no words to adequately describe the pain and loss caused by this senseless violence." Prime Minister Justin Trudeau called the stabbings "horrific and heartbreaking", and said he was "thinking of those who have lost a loved one and of those who were injured".

The Peace Tower in Ottawa and all federal buildings in Saskatchewan flew the Canadian flag at half-mast. Premier Moe announced that all flags at provincial government buildings would be lowered to half-mast for ten days in honour of the dead. Universities, school boards, municipal governments, and other organizations have also lowered flags to half-mast and released statements of condolences, with the Regina, Saskatoon and Prince Albert First Nations University campuses hosting prayer and candlelight vigils.

It was suggested by analysts that the RCMP's extensive use of emergency alerts as part of public communications regarding the manhunt was a contrast and response to the 2020 Nova Scotia attacks where the RCMP had relied almost exclusively on social media to post information regarding the suspect, and were unable to agree on an alert before the suspect was ultimately located and shot by police. At least 12 emergency alerts were issued between September 4 and 7: this included alerts directly related to the Sanderson manhunt, as well as alerts for unrelated reports of shots fired in Brittania, and Witchekan Lake First Nation.

The Parole Board of Canada committed to review the decision to release Myles Sanderson. Despite his extensive history of violence, Sanderson's initial grant of statutory release was mandatory. However, he violated his parole, leading to a suspension of his release, but the suspension was lifted despite the parole board acknowledging his high risk to re-offend violently.

During a September 8 press conference held at the Bernard Constant Community School in James Smith Cree Nation, Chief of James Smith Cree Nation, Wally Burns, Grand Chief Brian Hardlotte, Chief Bart Tsannie, and Vice Chief Christopher Jobb called on Canada to "address the roots of violence in Indigenous communities". They called for federal parole board reforms, greater "autonomy for communities like theirs, including tribal police and the ability for bands to issue resolutions that could ban members from a community", as well as increased support for mental health and addictions treatment programs. Darryl Burns—whose sister Gloria, a member of the community's response team and an addictions counsellor, was killed after responding alone to the emergency call—said that the widow of Damien Sanderson should not bear the "guilt and shame and responsibility" for the stabbings and that his family were choosing to forgive. Darryl Burns said that the plight of remote First Nation communities like theirs would only receive media attention for a two-week interval after the tragedy, so it was important to articulate their concerns during that window of time.

== See also ==
- 2019 Northern British Columbia murders, a shooting spree that occurred in Canada three years prior to the stabbing spree
- List of mass stabbings by death toll
