= 1972 Kettle Valley shooting =

1972 mass shooting in Kettle Valley, British Columbia, Canada

1972 Kettle Valley, British Columbia shooting
- Location: Kettle Valley, British Columbia, Canada
- Date: August 28, 1972
- Attack type: Mass murder
- Weapons: .22-caliber semi-automatic rifle; .30-caliber rifle
- Deaths: 6
- Injuries: 3
- Perpetrator: William Bernard Lepine
- Motive: Mental illness

A mass shooting occurred on August 28, 1972, in Kettle Valley, British Columbia, Canada. Six people were killed and three were wounded in one of the worst mass shootings in the province's history.

== Shooting ==
At around 9 a.m. on August 28, 1972, William Bernard Lepine, armed with a .22-calibre semi-automatic rifle and a .30-calibre rifle, killed Willard Potter and Charles Wright, who were working on irrigation equipment in an orchard at Oliver. He put the bodies into their Land Rover and drove northeast towards a campground on the Damfino Creek near Kelowna.

Around 11 a.m. he discarded the bodies of Potter and Wright on the Kettle Valley road not far from the camp, where they were found by police the next day. Afterwards he entered the campground, briefly chatted with Lester and Phyllis Clark, and Allan and Mildred Wilson, and then left, but returned shortly thereafter armed with one of his rifles, ordered the two couples into a truck, and opened fire, fatally hitting Phyllis Clark and wounding the other three. While Lepine escaped in his car, Lester Clark and Allan Wilson got into their vehicles and drove towards Westbridge in search of help. When they finally arrived there and informed police about the shooting, the search operation for Lepine started, in which about 25 officers of the Royal Canadian Mounted Police participated.

Later that afternoon, Lepine killed Herbert and Nellie Thomas near Edgewood and escaped in their car. Their bodies were found the next day. 48 km (30 miles) north of Edgewood, he shot dead Thomas Pozney, who was on a fishing trip at Lower Arrow Lake. His body was found by police during the night. Lepine was eventually arrested the next morning at Galena Bay and taken to the RCMP office in Nakusp before being transferred to Nelson.

== Perpetrator ==
27-year-old William Bernard Lepine (b. 1945) (also called William McConnell), an American, worked for some time in orchards in Summerland, British Columbia, before taking a gardening and maintenance job for the municipality of Creston in 1971. Later he was employed as a gardener and children's supervisor at the Dr. Endicott Home for the mentally unstable in that town, but was fired for taking one of their vehicles without permission. Afterwards he spent some time in the East Kootenay Mental Health Unit in Cranbrook, but returned several times to harass the staff at Creston.

In May 1972 he was admitted to the Riverview Mental Hospital in Coquitlam, from which he eventually escaped. He was captured and sent back to the hospital on July 6, but escaped again on July 30. According to the director of the institution, Lepine had no record of violent behaviour and was at the hospital for the first time.

== Aftermath ==
Lepine appeared at the provincial court in Nelson on August 30, where he was charged with six counts of murder. He entered no plea and was remanded for 30 days. On September 1 he was sent to Riverview Mental Hospital for psychiatric examination, and on September 28 was ordered to be confined there for an indefinite period of time, until he was fit to stand trial.

After being declared fit to stand trial, Lepine appeared again in court in October 1974, where his lawyer presented a statement in which his defendant admitted to having committed the murders. Lepine's psychiatrists found him to suffer from schizophrenia, and according to their court statements, he believed that he was chosen to save the world from a nuclear holocaust. They also testified that he was not aware of the nature or intent of his acts at the time of the murders. On October 7, 1974, he was found not guilty by reason of insanity, whereupon he was sent back to Riverview Mental Hospital.

On February 10, 1978, Lepine was ordered to be transferred to the Regional Psychiatric Centre at Matsqui, with an order to detain him there following on June 26, 1980. On August 15, 1991, he was ordered to be transferred to the Forensic Psychiatric Hospital in Port Coquitlam, but was ordered back to Matsqui on October 1 the same year. Eventually he was returned to the institution in Port Coquitlam, where he was still an inmate as of April 2008.

== Victims ==
- Phyllis Clark, 61
- Willard Lee Potter, 16
- Thomas John Pozney, 24
- Herbert Evan Thomas, 57, husband of Nellie Thomas
- Nellie Thomas, 56, wife of Herbert Thomas
- Charles Christopher Wright, 71

Those wounded were Lester Greggs Clark, 58, Allan Wilson, 62, and Mildred Wilson, 55.
