= 2022 Saanich shootout =

Shootout in Saanich, British Columbia

- The response of Saanich and Victoria Police departments to the robbery.
- Location: 48°27′32″N 123°20′00″W; BMO Bank of Montreal (Shelbourne & Pear Branch), 3616 Shelbourne Street; Saanich, British Columbia, Canada
- Date: June 28, 2022 c. 11:00 a.m. (UTC−07:00)
- Attack type: Bank robbery, shootout, mass shooting
- Weapon: 2 modified SKS rifles
- Deaths: 2 (both perpetrators)
- Injuries: 6 (police officers)
- Perpetrators: Mathew Auchterlonie; Isaac Auchterlonie
- Motive: Anti-police sentiment; Anti-government sentiment; Robbery

On June 28, 2022, a shootout occurred between two gunmen and responding police officers following a robbery of a Bank of Montreal branch in Saanich, British Columbia, Canada. Both gunmen, later identified as twin brothers Mathew and Isaac Auchterlonie, were killed by police, while six officers were injured, three of them severely.

Following an investigation by the Royal Canadian Mounted Police, it was alleged that the robbery had been staged as a means of drawing police officers into an armed confrontation. The Auchterlonie brothers had been motivated by anti-police sentiment and inspired by the North Hollywood shootout. The bank was selected at random by the brothers after they abandoned a larger attack planned for 2023.

== Events ==
Police responded to reports of armed suspects at a Bank of Montreal branch in Saanich at around 11:00 a.m. At the time of the robbery, approximately 22 people were inside the bank, most of them employees.

A witness described hearing an explosion before the robbery started. She also described the perpetrators as remaining calm throughout the robbery, wearing balaclavas and all-black clothing with armored vests, and being armed with an SKS rifle each, both with extended magazines.

The gunmen proceeded to move bank employees and customers into the back vault area. After acquiring cash from the bank manager, the gunmen remained inside the bank. They were observed to have been pacing back-and-forth between areas of the bank while inspecting the parking lot from the vestibule window.

Officers belonging to the Greater Victoria Emergency Response Team (GVERT), an integrated police unit designed to respond to high-risk incidents, were nearby on an unrelated call and moved to respond to the robbery. Members of the Saanich Police Department and the GVERT both arrived on scene.

After spending 16 minutes inside the bank, the gunmen proceeded to exit the bank into the parking lot. As they left the vestibule, one of the gunmen observed an approaching unmarked GVERT van and raised his rifle. An officer inside of the van deployed a flashbang explosive as the van passed by the gunmen.

A shootout ensued between the gunmen and officers located inside of the van. Nearby officers in the parking lot also returned fire. Both perpetrators were killed and six police officers were injured in the gunfire.

Witnesses reported hearing 15–50 gunshots. The road was later closed off, and nearby homes and businesses were evacuated due to a possible explosive found in a vehicle belonging to the robbers. At around 1:30 p.m., a shelter-in-place order was issued; it was lifted at around 6:00. Police later confirmed that 4 additional firearms, 3500 rounds of ammunition, and more than 30 improvised explosive devices were located inside the vehicle. They also investigated the possibility of a third suspect involved in the shootout, but it was later determined that there were only two suspects.

== Victims ==
The six injured police officers all belonged to the Greater Victoria Emergency Response Team, and comprised three Saanich Police Department officers and three Victoria Police Department officers. Three of the injured sustained "life-threatening" injuries and underwent surgery, with one of them remaining in intensive care. The other three injured officers were discharged from the hospital. No civilians were injured during the incident.

== Investigation ==
Police said that they believed the perpetrators were both wearing body armour and that the shootout started outside the bank, although it was unclear who fired first. The RCMP's Vancouver Island Integrated Major Crime Unit took over the investigation and treated the incident as an attempted murder. During a press conference on July 2, RCMP identified the suspects as twin brothers Mathew and Isaac Auchterlonie from Duncan. Neither had a criminal record or were previously known to police. A now-deleted Instagram account belonging to Isaac Auchterlonie featured several posts with anti-government hashtags and posts about the North Hollywood shootout.

In January 2023, the RCMP announced that the alleged motive for the robbery and shootout was "anti-police" and "anti-government" sentiments. Alex Bérubé of the RCMP's Vancouver Island Integrated Major Crime Unit alleged that the intention of the Auchterlonie brothers was "to shoot and kill police officers in what they saw as a stand against government regulations, especially in relation to firearms ownership". Police confirmed that they did not believe the brothers were motivated by money or that they intended to harm civilians.

Investigation by the RCMP determined that Mathew and Isaac Auchterlonie had allegedly been planning an attack on law enforcement since 2019. The duo had been stockpiling firearms and explosives in preparation for an attack they had planned to occur in mid-2023. However, the brothers abandoned their initial plan due to fears that an upcoming move out of their house would draw attention to their weapons. The brothers instead decided to stage a bank robbery for the purposes of provoking an armed police response and selected the Bank of Montreal branch in Saanich at random.

== Responses ==
The Saanich Police Association and the Victoria City Police Union started an online fundraising campaign for the injured officers. The campaign raised $277,752.

The interim chief of police of the Toronto Police Service, James Ramer, posted on Twitter that "[they] stand with [the officers'] families and hope for the full recovery of each officer."

Prime Minister Justin Trudeau also expressed on Twitter that he was "shocked and saddened by the violence" and that "[he is] keeping the police officers who were injured – and their colleagues who also rushed towards danger to keep people safe – in [his] thoughts."

== See also ==
- North Hollywood shootout
- 1986 FBI Miami shootout
