= Shell Lake murders =

Mass murder in Shell Lake, Saskatchewan, Canada

Coordinates: 53.310°N 107.063°W

- Victor Ernest Hoffman
- Location: Shell Lake, Saskatchewan, Canada
- Date: August 15, 1967
- Attack type: Home invasion, mass shooting, mass murder
- Weapon: .22-calibre Browning pump rifle
- Deaths: 9
- Perpetrator: Victor Ernest Hoffman

The Shell Lake murders is the name of a mass murder incident committed by Victor Ernest Hoffman (1946 – May 21, 2004) in Shell Lake, Saskatchewan, Canada. This incident occurred during the early morning of August 15, 1967. Nine people, all members of the Peterson family, were shot in the head by a man who was later called "Canada's worst random mass murderer."

== Events ==
Victor Hoffman was 21 years old at the time of the murders and had been released from a mental hospital just three weeks prior. On the morning of August 15, he entered the Petersons' farm armed with a .22-calibre Browning pump-action repeater rifle. He then proceeded to shoot all but one of the present members of the Peterson family, including seven children, at close range around the four-room house. According to police, 28 shots were fired in total, of which 27 found their target.

James Peterson was shot in the kitchen, while his wife Evelyn and her one-year-old baby were found in the backyard. The other six children were shot while sleeping in their bedrooms. Their ages ranged from 2 to 17 years old. Phyllis Peterson, then 4 years old, was the lone survivor of the massacre. She was sleeping under the bedclothes between her two sisters and was not noticed by Hoffman. However, Hoffman later declared that he spared her because "she had the face of an angel."

The bodies were found by Wildrew Lang who was to help James Peterson with farm duties later that morning. He had to travel 6 km (3.7 mi) to the next telephone post before he could report the incident to the police. The police immediately started an extensive manhunt on the surroundings of the house.

== Victims ==
- James Peterson, age 47
- Evelyn Peterson, 42
- Jean Peterson, 17
- Mary Peterson, 13
- Dorothy Peterson, 11
- Pearl Peterson, 9
- William Peterson, 5
- Colin Peterson, 2
- Larry Peterson, 1

The Petersons' oldest daughter, Kathy Peterson Hill (then age 19 or 20) was married and living in British Columbia at the time of the murders. She moved back to the Peterson farm and took custody of her youngest sister.

== Aftermath ==
Victor Ernest Hoffman
- Born: 1946
- Died: May 21, 2004 (aged 57–58)

On August 19, 1967, Hoffman was arrested by the Royal Canadian Mounted Police without putting up resistance. He was found at his parents' home in Leask, about 65 km (40 mi) southeast of Shell Lake. After his arrest he told the police that he had fought the devil before the murders and described him as being "tall, black and having no genitals." He was remanded to a mental hospital in North Battleford where he was diagnosed with paranoid schizophrenia.

Hoffman was found not guilty by reason of insanity on non-capital murder charges in February 1968. During the trial, Crown prosecutor Serge Kujawa called Hoffman "the craziest man in Saskatchewan." He was put under the custody of the provincial Health Ministry and sent to a mental institution. He remained most of the time in an Ontario-based institution until December 2001, when he was granted supervised access to the towns of Penetanguishene, Port McNicoll and Midland in Ontario. This decision was not without controversy since the hospital was only required to inform the local police of Hoffman's release.

Canadian journalist Peter Tadman wrote a book about the murders in 1992 and had the chance to interview Hoffman several times. According to Tadman, Hoffman felt no guilt about the murders and reported that he still saw the devil that compelled him to commit them.

Hoffman died of cancer under custody on May 21, 2004.

== In popular culture ==
Manitoba country musician Irvin Freese took an interest in the event, writing and recording "The Shell Lake Disaster" which was released as a 45 on Winnipeg's Eagle Records label (ER-128) within a month of the event (September 1967). Lawyers threatened the label with a lawsuit, and the 45 was rapidly recalled. This rarity has recently been released on "The Best Of Eagle Records" on the Super Oldies label (2009).

== See also ==
- Rochfort Bridge massacre
- École Polytechnique Massacre
- List of massacres in Canada
