= Dale Nelson =

Canadian mass murderer

Dale Merle Nelson
- Born: Dale Merle Nelson; March 19, 1939; Creston, British Columbia, Canada
- Died: February 10, 1999 (aged 59); Abbotsford, British Columbia, Canada
- Relatives: Everett Nelson (great nephew)
- Conviction: Non-capital murder
- Penalty: Life imprisonment

Details
- Date: September 5, 1970
- Locations: Creston, British Columbia
- Killed: 8
- Weapons: Fire extinguisher Knife; Hammer; 7mm Mauser 98k Bolt-action rifle

Dale Merle Nelson (March 19, 1939 – February 10, 1999) was a Canadian mass murderer who killed eight people (including five young children) and partially ate one victim in 1970 following a drinking binge and possible use of LSD.

== Personal life ==
Nelson was a logger in Creston, British Columbia, married with three children. He reportedly physically abused his wife. Nelson was also known to become aggressive and unpredictable when he drank to excess and to have used LSD. The combination of mental illness and substance use likely fueled his spree.

Nelson fell into a depressed state in early 1970 and unsuccessfully attempted suicide. He subsequently spent two months at Riverview Hospital in Coquitlam.

== Murders ==
On September 4, 1970, Nelson drove into Creston, purchased six beers and a bottle of vodka at the liquor store, drove to the Kootenay Hotel and drank eight beers with friends. Friends say he chatted about the upcoming hunting season, and did not act unusual in any way. He left the tavern and picked up from Maureen McKay a 7mm Mauser 98k bolt action rifle he had loaned to her, then drove back to Creston to purchase ammunition for the gun as well as more alcohol. He went to the King George Hotel, where he drank six more beers before joining his friends in a hotel room at 10:30 p.m. for more drinks.

Just after midnight, he drove to the home of his distant relative, Shirley Wasyk, knowing her husband Alex was not home. He beat Shirley with a home fire extinguisher, and she cried out, "No, Dale, don't!" He tied Shirley's hands behind her back and left her on her bed, then gathered two of his three young relatives (Charlene, age eight, and Tracey, age seven) in the youngest girl's bedroom. Awakened by her mother's cry, 12-year-old Debbie saw Nelson taking Charlene into Tracey's room. She crept to her mother and untied her hands, then took the fire extinguisher and returned to her own room. When she heard Tracey scream and then the sounds of Nelson at her door, she threw the fire extinguisher through her bedroom window and escaped—running to the McKay household. Maureen McKay quickly telephoned the Royal Canadian Mounted Police.

When law enforcement officers arrived at the Wasyk home, Nelson's truck was still parked outside. Shirley had been beaten to death with the fire extinguisher, and Tracey had died from multiple stab wounds. Charlene had been set free in the woods nearby. The police immediately drove to the Nelson household where they evacuated his wife, Annette, and his children, fearing that they might be the next targets. When they returned to the Wasyk home 15 minutes later, they were "stunned" to realise that Nelson had still been at the scene of the crime and driven away with Tracey's body as soon as they had left.

Shortly afterward, Isabel St. Amand, who lived a few kilometres down the road from the Wasyks, phoned the police to report "There's a man here with a gun." By the time police arrived, St. Amand, her common-law husband Ray Phipps, and their three sons (Paul, age 10; Brian, age seven; and Roy, age 18 months) had all been shot in the head. Their eight-year-old daughter Cathy was missing, and police immediately launched a manhunt employing bush pilots to scour the countryside for Nelson's truck. The vehicle was found on the afternoon of September 5 stuck in a ditch, and when police searched it they found a bloody hammer and dismembered remains of Tracey Wasyk scattered around the area. The 150 residents of West Creston were moved into Creston for their own safety, as police continued their search for Nelson.

Nelson was located late in the afternoon on September 6 in a shack in the woods near his home, and surrendered to police without incident. He told them that Cathy was dead, pointed out the location of her body on a map, and admitted committing all eight murders.

He was put on trial for the murders of eight-year old Cathy Rose St. Amand (whom he had also sodomised) and seven-year-old Tracey Wasyk (whose organs he tore out and attempted to eat).

Represented by attorney M. E. Moran, Nelson was found guilty in March 1971 despite a plea of criminal insanity brought about by his heavy drinking and use of LSD. He was sentenced to life imprisonment.

== Legacy ==
In 1972, Larry Still, a reporter for the Vancouver Sun who covered Nelson's trial, published The Limits of Sanity, a book about the murders.

Dale Nelson died of throat cancer on February 10, 1999, while in prison.
