= Thomas Young (mass murderer) =

Canadian mass murderer

- Young at a construction camp about two years before the murders
- Born: 1931; Ear Falls, Ontario, Canada
- Died: June 30, 1959 (aged 27); Kenora District Jail, Kenora, Ontario, Canada
- Occupation: Ontario Hydro worker (formerly)
- Status: Executed by hanging
- Motive: Jealousy; Rage
- Conviction: Murder
- Penalty: Death

Details
- Date: December 25, 1958
- Country: Canada
- Location: Ear Falls, Ontario
- Killed: 5
- Weapons: .303-caliber rifle; .38-caliber revolver (stolen from constable Fulford)

Thomas Young (1931 – June 30, 1959) was a Canadian mass murderer and alleged rapist who killed five people, including his father and a police officer, in Ear Falls, Ontario, early on Christmas Day in 1958. Young was convicted of murder for killing the police officer, Calvin Fulford, whom he shot with the officer's own service revolver, and sentenced to death. He was executed in 1959.

== Early life ==
Thomas Young had two brothers, one of whom was named John. He was a former Ontario Hydro worker.

== Murders, trial, and execution ==
On late December 24, 1958, Thomas got into an argument at a Christmas party. When his brother, John Young intervened, Thomas slapped him in the face and said he was going home.

On December 25, a drunken Thomas was at the cabin of his father, 47-year-old Albert Young, when a young couple, Walter "Jimmy" Gordon, 18, and Clara Gordon, 16, arrived with his brother John to play phonograph records. John opened the kitchen door to find Thomas standing there holding a .303-caliber rifle. He yelled at the others to run before Thomas opened fire. Albert and the Gordons were killed. Thomas also tried to kill John and another teen who was present, 16-year-old David Williams, but both managed to escape.

The two went to the house of David's father, 47-year-old George Williams, and told him what had happened. John and George then went to the house of constable Calvin Russell Fulford, 28, for help. Fulford had been preparing for Christmas with his wife and their three children, ages 21 months to 9 years, and the family had just opened presents.

After being told about Thomas, Fulford got his .38-caliber service revolver and approached the Young cabin with John and George. When the three were about 60 feet away from the cabin, Thomas opened fire on them. Williams tried to charge him but was fatally shot. Fulford was shot in the shoulder and tried to crawl back to his car. He managed to crawl about 20 yards before losing consciousness. Thomas then approached Fulford, took his revolver, jammed it into his mouth, and shot him. John managed to escape unharmed.

John ran back to Fulford's house and told the officer's wife what had happened. She called the police, and the two officers who responded found Fulford's body. They radioed for help and additional officers arrived. They entered the cabin, where they found the bodies. Thomas started firing at the officers from his grandparents' nearby shack. The officers crawled near it and flushed him out by firing two tear gas bombs inside. Thomas subsequently surrendered and was found with a rifle and Fulford's revolver. He did not give a reason for the murders.

Thomas was charged only with Fulford's murder. During the investigation, police did not state an official motive, but said there was strong evidence that Clara Gordon had been raped. She had fled the house, but was dragged inside by Thomas. Her body was found on a couch. Neighbours said Thomas had been upset when Clara, who he had known for years, married Gordon. They described him as moody and unpredictable. It was later found that Clara had been pregnant. The couple had only been married for about two weeks.

During his murder trial in March 1959, multiple witnesses said Thomas was the shooter. Thomas was the only witness to take the stand in his defence. He said he was drinking heavily that night and could not remember what had happened. Thomas claimed his last memory was leaving a party at a neighbour's home and heading home, and that he "came to" while walking on a nearby highway, and realized he was carrying a rifle and a revolver. He then said he came across the bodies, got scared, and ran to his grandparents' home.

The trial lasted four days. On March 21, after deliberating for three hours, the jury found Thomas guilty of murder. He was sentenced to death without a recommendation for mercy, and had an execution date set for June 30. Thomas did not react as the verdict and sentence were read. After Thomas's appeals failed and the federal cabinet denied his bid for reprieve, he was hanged as scheduled at the Kenora District Jail. A sheriff said Thomas was "exceptionally calm" as he walked to the gallows and had no last words. He was pronounced dead at 2:20 am.

A bridge was named in Fulford's honor in 2011.
