= Shell Lake, Saskatchewan =

Village in Saskatchewan, Canada

Shell Lake (2016 population: 175) is a village in the Canadian province of Saskatchewan within the Rural Municipality of Spiritwood No. 496 and Census Division No. 16. This village is 90 kilometres west of the city of Prince Albert. It was formerly part of the Rural Municipality of Shell Lake No. 495 before it was absorbed by the RM of Spiritwood No. 496. It is the administrative centre of the Ahtahkakoop Cree Nation band government.

== History ==
Shell Lake incorporated as a village on October 18, 1940.

The Shell Lake murders took place on a nearby farm in 1967.

== Demographics ==
Population history (1981–2016)
Year	Pop.	±%
1981	220	—
1986	218	−0.9%
1991	172	−21.1%
1996	172	+0.0%
2001	185	+7.6%
2006	152	−17.8%
2011	152	+0.0%
2016	175	+15.1%
Source: Statistics Canada via Saskatchewan Bureau of Statistics

In the 2021 Census of Population conducted by Statistics Canada, Shell Lake had a population of 189 living in 94 of its 150 total private dwellings, a change of 8% from its 2016 population of 175. With a land area of 1.39 km^{2} (0.54 sq mi), it had a population density of 136.0/km^{2} (352.2/sq mi) in 2021.

In the 2016 Census of Population, the village of Shell Lake recorded a population of 175 living in 95 of its 231 total private dwellings, a 13.1% change from its 2011 population of 152. With a land area of 1.23 km^{2} (0.47 sq mi), it had a population density of 142.3/km^{2} (368.5/sq mi) in 2016.

== Memorial Lake Regional Park ==
Memorial Lake Regional Park (53.2973°N 107.0617°W) is a regional park adjacent to the village of Shell Lake on the western shore of Memorial Lake in the RM of Spiritwood No. 496. Located at the intersection of Highways 3 and 12, the 300-acre park was established in 1962. Amenities at the park include camping, swimming, boating, ball diamonds, golfing, picnicking, and hiking.

Memorial Lake is a spring fed, 402-acre lake that is 9.8 metres (32 ft) deep with a sandy bottom. There's a beach, dock, boat launch, marina, and fish filleting station. Northern pike are commonly found in the lake. The campground has 144 electrified campsites situated among pine and poplar trees with access to potable water, washrooms and showers, and a sewer dump. In the park, there are 59 privately owned cabins. Near the entrance to the park there's an 18-hole minigolf with a concession that serves soft ice cream and beverages. On a hill in the park, there is a stone monument built by local boy scouts in 1929. The stones used were gathered from the homesteads of local men who died in World War I.

The Memorial Lake Regional Golf Course is an 18-hole, grass greens course that is a par 71 with 6,002 total yards. There is a pro shop with club and cart rentals and a licensed clubhouse that has an appetizer menu.

== See also ==
- List of communities in Saskatchewan
- List of francophone communities in Saskatchewan
