= Mannville, Alberta =

Village in Alberta, Canada, incorporated 1906

Mannville
- Village
- Village of Mannville
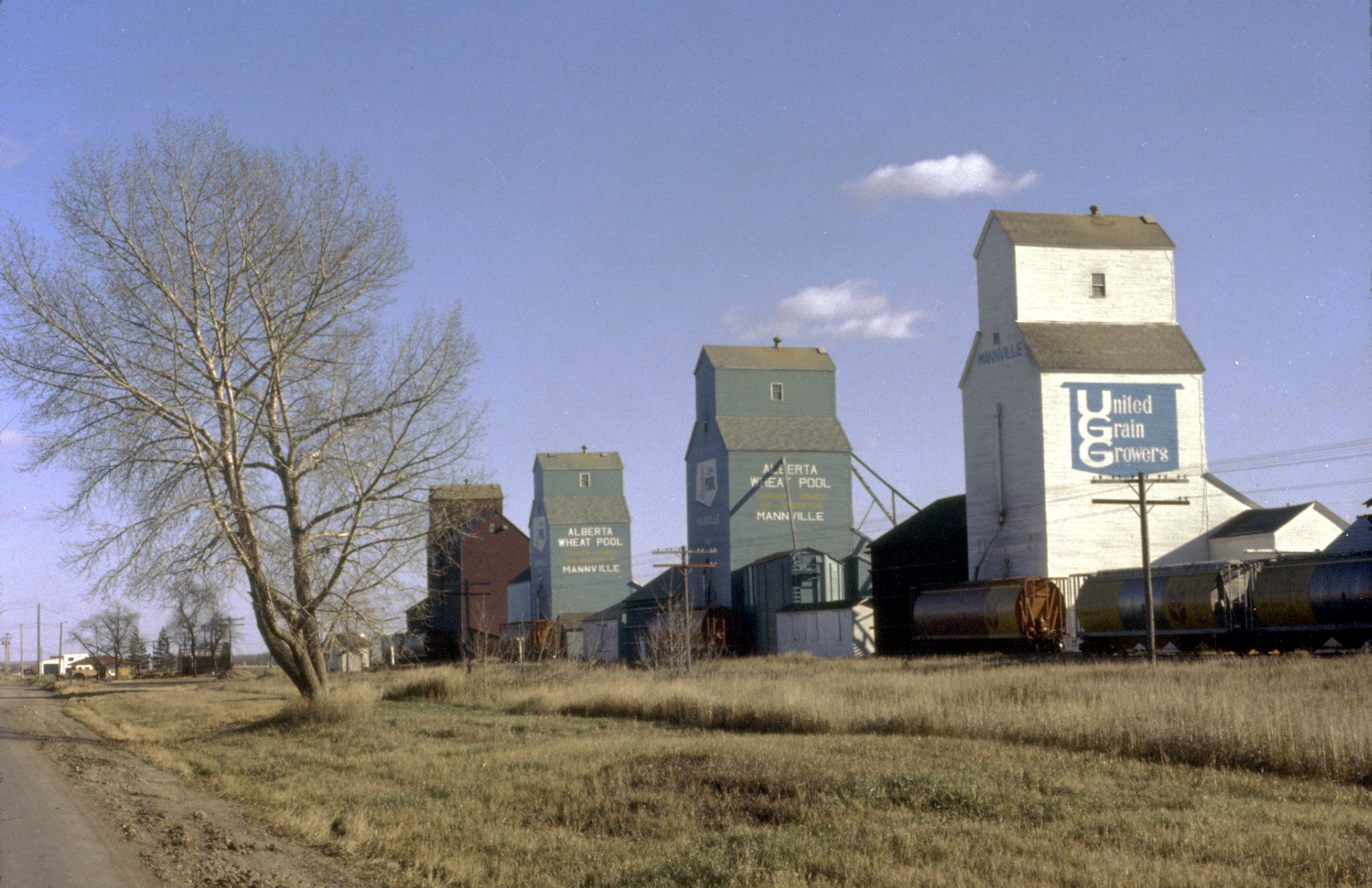
- Grain elevators, circa 1980
- Motto: All Trails Lead to Mannville
- Location within Alberta
- Coordinates: 53°20′08″N 111°10′32″W
- Country: Canada
- Province: Alberta
- Region: Central Alberta
- Census division: 10
- Municipal district: County of Minburn No. 27
- Incorporated
  - Village: December 26, 1906

Government
  - Mayor: Reid Roland
  - Governing body: Mannville Village Council

Area (2021)
  - Land: 1.64 km^{2} (0.63 sq mi)
- Elevation: 625 m (2,051 ft)

Population (2021)
  - Total: 765
  - Density: 466.3/km^{2} (1,208/sq mi)
- Time zone: UTC−06:00 (Alberta Time)
- Highways: Highway 16; Highway 881
- Website: Official website

Mannville is a village in central Alberta, Canada. It is located at the intersection of the Yellowhead Highway and Highway 881, approximately 22 kilometres (14 mi) west of Vermilion and 170 kilometres (110 mi) east of Edmonton. Its primary industry is agriculture.

== History ==
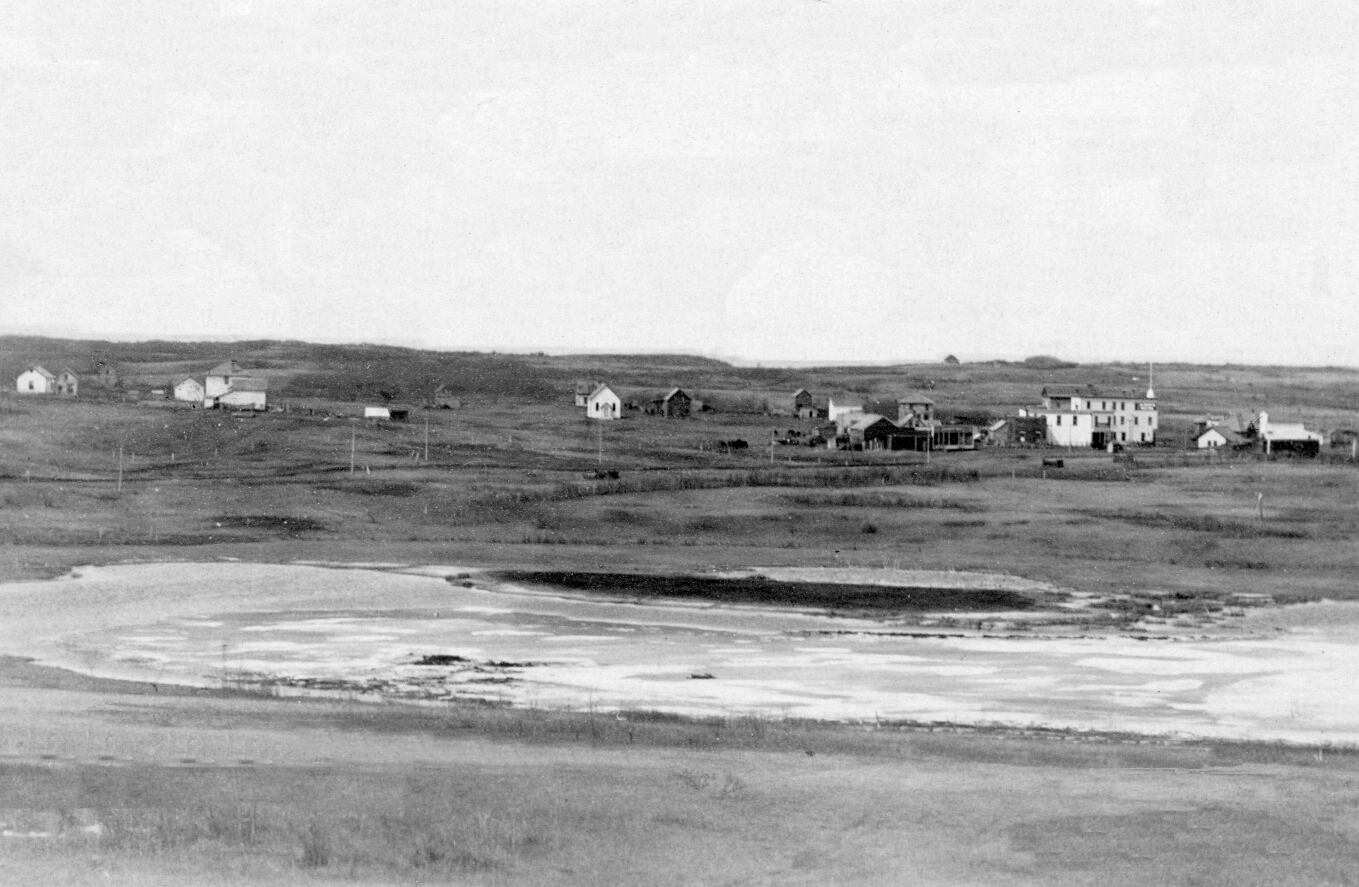
Mannville, 1913

The settlement was named for Sir Donald Mann, vice-president of the Canadian Northern Railway.

On July 9, 1928, Vernon Booher killed his mother, brother, and two farm hands in Mannville following his argument with his mother. Booher had killed the others to eliminate witnesses. Booher's case drew attention after Adolph Langsner, a psychiatrist who claimed to be able to read minds, correctly guessed that he was the murderer and where he had hidden the weapon used. Booher was hanged for the murders in 1929.

The Mannville Group, an oil and gas bearing unit of the Western Canadian Sedimentary Basin, was named for the village by A.W. Nauss in 1945.

== Demographics ==
In the 2021 Census of Population conducted by Statistics Canada, the Village of Mannville had a population of 765 living in 339 of its 397 total private dwellings, a change of −7.6% from its 2016 population of 828. With a land area of 1.64 km^{2} (0.63 sq mi), it had a population density of 466.5/km^{2} (1,208.1/sq mi) in 2021.

In the 2016 Census of Population conducted by Statistics Canada, the Village of Mannville recorded a population of 828 living in 341 of its 377 total private dwellings, a 3.1% change from its 2011 population of 803. With a land area of 1.64 km^{2} (0.63 sq mi), it had a population density of 504.9/km^{2} (1,307.6/sq mi) in 2016.

== Notable people ==
- Frances Bay (1919–2011): actress
- Vernon Booher (1907–1929): mass murderer
- Kyle Calder (1979-2026): professional hockey player
- Peter Gadsden (1929–2006): Lord Mayor of London
- Erving Goffman (1922–1982): sociologist
- Mike Rathje (born 1974): professional hockey player
- Miles Zaharko (born 1957): professional hockey player

== See also ==
- List of communities in Alberta
- List of francophone communities in Alberta
- List of villages in Alberta
