= Langside Street massacre =

2023 mass shooting in Winnipeg, Canada

2023 Winnipeg shooting
- Location: 143 Langside Street, West Broadway, Winnipeg, Manitoba, Canada
- Date: November 26, 2023; 3:55 a.m. (CDT)
- Attack type: Spree shooting, mass murder
- Weapon: 9mm semi-automatic handgun
- Deaths: 5 (including a victim who died from complications in 2025)
- Motive: Psychosis

On November 26, 2023, a mass shooting took place in a multi-unit home (described in court as a "crack shack") in Winnipeg, Manitoba, Canada.

It is one of the worst cases of mass murder in Manitoba history.

== Shooting ==
At least nine shots were fired from a 9mm handgun.

Two victims were found dead at the scene and two others were taken to hospital, where they later succumbed to their wounds. Four of the five victims were shot in the head, while the fifth victim, Shawn Marko, was shot three times in the chest.

== Victims ==
- Crystal Shannon Beardy (34): Died at the scene from gunshot wounds to the head
- Stephanie Amanda Beardy (33): Crystal's sister; died in hospital from gunshot wounds to the head
- Melelek Leseri Lesikel (29): Died at the scene from a gunshot wound to the head
- Dylan Maxwell Lavallee (41): Died at the scene from a gunshot wound to the head from a range of only six inches
- Shawn Marko (56): Initially survived the shooting and identified Felix (then using the name Jamie Houle) to police. He died in hospital 18 months later on June 1, 2025, after succumbing to complications related to his gunshot wounds

== Perpetrator ==
A 32-year-old former military corporal with the Royal Winnipeg Rifles was arrested on December 1, 2023, and charged with four counts of second-degree murder and one count of attempted murder.

== See also ==
- Sitar family murders
