= Buffalo Narrows murders =

1969 mass murder in Saskatchewan, Canada

- Location: Buffalo Narrows, Saskatchewan, Canada
- Date: January 30, 1969
- Attack type: Mass stabbing
- Weapon: Axe
- Deaths: 7
- Injuries: 1
- Perpetrator: Frederick Moses McCallum
- Verdict: Found not guilty by reason of insanity

On the night of January 30, 1969, in Buffalo Narrows, Saskatchewan, Canada, Frederick Moses McCallum, 19, broke into the Pederson family home with a long-handled fire axe, killing seven people and wounding one.

== Events ==
Frederick Moses McCallum, 19, broke the door to the Pederson family home and, with a long-handled fire axe, killed seven people and wounded one. In the home, he killed the father, mother, family friend, two sons, and two daughters and wounded one son. All the bodies of family members lay in bed, and the body of a family friend lay in the living room. After the killings, McCallum called a local priest and told him about the killings. The priest called the police. When police detained McCallum, he was sat in the kitchen and drinking tea. After the murders, the wounded son was in a coma for several months. In court, a psychiatrist said McCallum had signs of schizophrenia. McCallum was initially found unfit for criminal responsibility and sent to a psychiatric hospital in Ontario. In 1970, he was allowed to stand trial, and McCallum was sent to Prince Albert Penitentiary. After some time, he was again diagnosed with schizophrenia and sent to a psychiatric institution in Penetanguishene. In 1989, McCallum was released on the condition that he did not return to Saskatchewan.

== Victims ==
In the two-room house the RCMP found the bodies of:

- Thomas Pederson, 32
- John Baptiste Herman, 48, of La Loche, who was a guest
- Grace Ann Pederson, 8
- Robert Thomas Pederson, 5
- Richard Daniel Pederson, 4
- Rhonda Beatrice Pederson, 2
- Bernadette Pederson, 32, the mother of the children, died a few hours later
- Fred Donald Pederson, 7, survived the attack with head injuries
