= Kettle Valley =

- Location of Kettle Valley in British Columbia
- Coordinates: 49°03′00″N 118°56′00″W
- Country: Canada
- Province: British Columbia
- Region: Boundary Country
- Regional District: Kootenay Boundary
- Area codes: 250, 778, 236, & 672
- Highways: off Highway 3

Kettle Valley is on the south side of the Kettle River in the Boundary region of south central British Columbia. The unincorporated settlement, on Kettle Valley Rd S. (off BC Highway 3), is by road about 29 kilometres (18 mi) west of Greenwood and 56 kilometres (35 mi) east of Osoyoos.

== Name origin ==
The name came from the Kettle Valley Railway presence.

== Railway ==
The former train station, on the north side of the Kettle River, was 14.2 kilometres (8.8 mi) northwest of Midway, and 4.7 kilometres (2.9 mi) east of Rock Creek. The final passenger train ran in 1964.

Train Timetables (Regular stop or Flag stop)
Year	1918	1926	1929	1932	1935	1939	1943	1948	1954	1955	1961
Ref.											
Type	Regular	Flag	None	Flag	Flag	Flag	Flag	Regular	Reg/Flag	Reg/Flag	Flag

== Community ==
The post office operated 1913–1975. By 1918, the rural hamlet also had an Anglican church and population of 60. Nowadays, most residences lie south of the river, across the concrete-decked bridge which replaced the war-surplus Bailey bridge in 2001.
