= 2001 Kirkland shootings =

Spree shooting in Montreal, Canada

Kirkland shootings
- Location: Kirkland and Notre-Dame-de-Grâce, Montreal, Quebec, Canada
- Date: September 18–20, 2001
- Attack type: Spree shooting, arson, mass murder, murder-suicide
- Weapon: .22-caliber revolver
- Deaths: 7 (including the perpetrator)
- Perpetrator: John Bauer
- Motive: Financial troubles

Between the dates of September 18 and 20, 2001, 51-year-old John Bauer carried out a shooting spree in the town of Kirkland and the Notre-Dame-de-Grâce neighbourhood of Montreal, Quebec, Canada. Bauer targeted his family members and a business partner. After shooting the final victim, Bauer set fire to the home and then died by suicide.

== Shootings ==
On September 18, at their family home in Kirkland, John Bauer shot his wife with a stolen .22-caliber revolver. Later that day, he shot his three sons in the house. On September 19, Bauer shot his father-in-law at his home in the Notre-Dame-de-Grâce area. On the morning of September 20, he shot and killed his business partner. He then set fire to the house and shot himself. All the victims were shot in the back of the head. The bodies of Bauer's family members were hidden in the house, and the bodies of Bauer and his business partner, Lucio Beccherini were found in the kitchen. After the shooting, another of Bauer's bosses revealed that he was also invited to Bauer's home on September 20.

== Perpetrator ==
John Bauer, 51, was a former athlete. At the time of his death, he owed $500,000. He also had debts due to gambling. His eldest son also had debts due to gambling, which he paid for his son. Bauer owed money to his father-in-law and his business partners. On September 20, three of his relatives received death threats by mail which were eventually followed through by Bauer personally as he couldn't pay his or his son's debts.
