= Vernon Booher =

Canadian mass murderer (1907–1929)

Vernon Elwood Booher
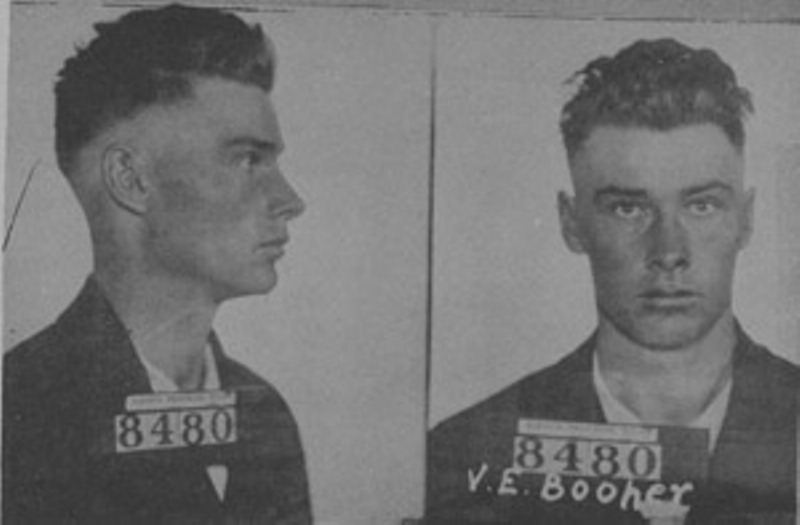
- Born: 1907; Canada
- Died: April 24, 1929 (aged 21); Fort Saskatchewan Provincial Gaol, Alberta, Canada
- Status: Executed by hanging
- Motive: Argument with his mother Eliminating witnesses
- Conviction: Murder (4 counts)
- Penalty: Death

Details
- Date: July 9, 1928
- Country: Canada
- Location: Mannville, Alberta
- Killed: 4
- Weapon: .303 Lee-Enfield Rifle

Vernon Elwood Booher (1907 – April 24, 1929) was a Canadian mass murderer who killed four people, including his mother and brother, in Mannville, Alberta, on July 9, 1928. He shot his victims with a rifle. The case drew attention since Booher confessed after a self-proclaimed mind-reader correctly guessed that Booher was the killer and where he had hidden the murder weapon.

On appeal, Booher won a retrial and had his confession suppressed, albeit it did not change the outcome of his case. He was found guilty of murder for a second time, sentenced to death, and executed in 1929.

The murder of the Booher family was described as one of the most heinous crimes to occur in Western Canada's history, and came as a shock to many residents of Mannville. It was extensively written about in publications such as the Edmonton Journal, The Calgary Herald, The Calgary Albertan, and The Edmonton Bulletin.

== Murders ==
On July 9, 1928, around 7:30pm, Booher fatally shot his mother, Eunice, his brother, Fred, and two farm hands, Gabriel Grombey and Wasyl Rozak, with a .303 British rifle. Vernon had stolen the rifle from a neighbor named C. Stevenson, whose farm was located about a mile from the Booher's.

Eunice was found sitting at the dining room table, shot in the back of the head. She had apparently been preparing for dinner when she was killed, as there was a bowl of fruit on the dining room table, a pie found on the kitchen counter, and a pot full of rice was being prepared on the stove. Fred was found nearby in the kitchen doorway, shot through the mouth and back. He had likely run into the kitchen after hearing his mother being shot. Rozak, a Polish immigrant also known as "Bill", was found at the bunkhouse, shot in the chin. Grombey was the last to be found in the barn, shot through the back of the head. Vernon had intended to frame Grombey for the murder, planning to throw his body and the rifle in a body of water. However, he ran out of time, and was arrested not long after.

Three members of the Booher family were absent from the farm when the murders occurred. Vernon's father, Henry Booher, was away on business at another farm approximately 2 miles (3200 m) from the house that evening. Vernon's younger sisters, Dorthy and Algerto were also not present, as they were attending basketball practice in Manville.

When authorities arrived, Booher claimed he had been out in the pasture, attending to cows when he heard the shots. He ran back to the farmhouse to find his mother and brother dead, then ran to a neighbour named Alex Ross to contact the police.

== Investigation ==
The gun used in the murder was found on Sunday, July 19, 1928, about 235 yards (215 m) from the Booher household. Vernon had reportedly disposed of it while running to the Ross farm.

== Confession and trial ==
Booher's first trial began on July 18, 1928. The jury consisted of 6 men, all from Mannville. Booher was described as "cold" and "calm" as he gave his defence, and displayed no remorse later on in the trial. While in custody, he had only expressed remorse for killing his brother.

Due to mounting evidence, Booher confessed to the crime on Monday, July 22. He stated that he killed his mother since she did not like his girlfriend, and killed the others since they were witnesses. There was also reportedly tension with his brother Fred as he was doing better financially and socially compared to Vernon. His girlfriend at the time worked at a local hospital, and Vernon would often fake injures to get out of work and to go visit her.

The case drew attention since Booher had confessed after Adolph Langsner, a psychiatrist who claimed to be able to read minds, correctly guessed that Booher was the murderer and where he had hidden the weapon, which he helped the police find using a makeshift map. Booher was charged with four counts of murder, found guilty, and was sentenced to death. On appeal, Booher won a retrial and had his confession suppressed, but was then convicted a second time. Booher did not receive a recommendation for mercy at either of his trials.

== Execution and aftermath ==
While imprisoned Booher was described as a model prisoner. On the morning of his hanging, his last meal consisted of bacon, eggs, toast and coffee. He refused the offer of opiates to help with nerves when it came to the execution. He chose to be executed in his own clothes instead of the standard clothing of the day.

Booher was hanged at the Fort Saskatchewan Provincial Gaol on April 24, 1929. at 4:40 a.m. He was pronounced dead at 4:50 a.m.

No family stepped forward to claim his remains. He is interred at the Fort Saskatchewan Gaol Cemetery. He was buried without a grave marker.
