= Robert Raymond Cook =

Canadian mass murderer (1937–1960)

- Cook's booking photo on June 30, 1959
- Born: July 15, 1937; Hanna, Alberta, Canada
- Died: November 15, 1960 (aged 23); Fort Saskatchewan Provincial Gaol, Fort Saskatchewan, Alberta, Canada
- Status: Executed by hanging
- Convictions: Murder; Breaking and entering
- Penalty: Death

Details
- Date: June 25, 1959
- Country: Canada
- Location: Stettler, Alberta
- Target: Family
- Killed: 7
- Weapon: 12-gauge double-barrelled shotgun
- Date apprehended: June 27, 1959

Robert Raymond Cook (July 15, 1937 – November 15, 1960) was a Canadian mass murderer who was convicted of killing his father, Raymond Cook, in Stettler, Alberta, on June 25, 1959. Robert killed his entire family at their home in Stettler, albeit he only stood trial for killing his father. He was found guilty of murder and sentenced to death.

After officials declined to grant clemency, Robert was hanged in 1960. He was the last person to be executed in the province of Alberta.

== Early life ==
Robert's mother died when he was 9 years old. He first got into trouble when he was 10, for stealing a car. When Robert was 12, his father married Robert's elementary teacher, Daisy Mae Gaspar. The family moved from Hanna to Stettler.

Robert first went to jail when he was 10 years old. From the time of his first incarceration to his execution, Robert spent a total of less than a year outside of prison.

== Murders, trial, and execution ==
Months before the murders, Robert was hit in the head with a lead pipe while serving time for breaking and entering and car theft. After this incident, he was noted as becoming more quick-tempered.

On June 28, 1959, police discovered the bodies of Raymond Cook, 53, his wife, 37-year-old Daisy Cook, and their five children: Gerald, 9, Patrick William, 8, Christopher Fred, 7, Kathy, 5, and Linda Mae, 3, dead. The adults had been shot with a 12-gauge double-barrelled shotgun. The children had been bludgeoned to death with the rifle butt. The bodies were found in the grease pit of their garage in Stettler, Alberta. The victims were in their nightwear and blood was found on the mattresses, indicating that the massacre happened as the family was sleeping. The massacre had been committed three days earlier.

Robert had been arrested in Stettler the day before and charged with obtaining goods under false pretences, after he had traded the family's 1958 Chevrolet station wagon for a 1959 Impala convertible. Inside the trunk, the police found birth certificates, insurance policies, Raymond Cook's marriage certificate, and the report cards of the children. Robert also had a suitcase with four sets of children's pyjamas, new bed sheets, and a photo album with pictures of his mother. When the officers asked Robert where his parents were, he repeatedly changed his story. At one point, he claimed his father gave him $4100, and that the family had moved to British Columbia. However, the best friend of Raymond Cook said he knew nothing about this plan.

Robert was accused of committing the massacre, but was tried only for the murder of his father. Just after midnight on July 11, 1959, he escaped from the Ponoka Mental Institution he was detained in, for a psychiatric assessment, after he had been denied permission to attend the funerals of his family. Robert's escape sparked one of the biggest manhunts in Alberta history. Officials had 100 members of the RCMP, police dogs, 50 soldiers from the local militia, and aircraft search for Robert. Several days later, he was found hiding in a pig farm near Bashaw, Alberta.

In December 1959, Robert was found guilty of murder and sentenced to death. He won a retrial on appeal, but was found guilty of murder once more in June 1960. The jury did not make a recommendation of mercy at either of his trials. The prosecutor, John Wallace Anderson, described Robert as one of the quickest thinking defendants whom he had ever met.

"He was sharp as a fox. He scared the hell out of me a couple of times with his mental acuity. He was cross-examining us while were cross-examining him, to give himself time to formulate his answers. I was the hare rather than the hound. My associate and I had to write out questions for Bobby and throw them in a hat so we could pull them out at random in the courtroom, and break the continuity of questioning to keep him from anticipating what was coming next."

Robert maintained his innocence up until his execution. While on death row at the Fort Saskatchewan Provincial Gaol, Robert authored a poem as part of a last-minute plea for clemency sent to the Solicitor General of Canada, and Prime Minister John G. Diefenbaker.

I sit here in my death cell, I know not why,
For the evidence proved me innocent, and that is no lie
Seven members of my family, murdered to date,
The jury on a guess would make it number eight,
Was it planned that way or was it just fate.
My lawyers family threatened with the same,
What reason can there be for such a dirty game,
The judge directed, pay no heed and reject that lead,
Pay no heed to another one, pay no heed to the shirt and gun,
Close your eyes, you need not see,
Two places at once I could not be,
So I ask you is it strange that I am sentenced to the noose.
While my family's killer is on the loose.

He wiped up his finger prints, all traces of his crime,
Putting a stained suit under the mattress, no doubt he knew it was mine
His purpose clear to see the murder of the missing member without fear of the fine

Time he would gain and safe he would be
So I ask you is it strange that I am sentenced to the noose
While my family's killer is on the loose.

My family's funeral I wanted to attend,
I had to escape and sealed my own fate in the end.
If my loved ones saw, and wondered why I was not there,
I pray God told them of the hounds and the hare.
They hounded me by day, they hounded me by night
Blood hounds and helicopters, oh, what a sight.
Out to murder, armed and dangerous they said,
That is so funny, I'll laugh till I am dead.
So I ask you is it strange that I am sentenced to the noose.
While my family's killer is on the loose.

I've heard of justice, but where can it be,
I looked in the dictionary, behold! there it is to see.
When I sent for my lawyer he just shook his head.
Justice will only come long after you're dead.
So you people of the world take note,
It's murder when the innocent die, at the end of a rope.

After officials declined to grant a reprieve, Robert was hanged at the Fort Saskatchewan Provincial Gaol just after midnight on November 15, 1960. He was pronounced dead at 12:19 am. He had been baptised into the Lutheran faith the night prior to his execution. The case has been the subject of several books and two plays.
