= 2022 Vaughan shooting =

2022 shooting in Vaughan, Ontario

- Location: 43.8331606°N 79.5327636°W; Bellaria Residences, 9235 Jane Street, Vaughan, Ontario, Canada
- Date: December 18, 2022 c. 7:20 p.m (EST)
- Attack type: Mass shooting, mass murder
- Weapon: Beretta 92A1 semi-automatic pistol
- Deaths: 6 (including the perpetrator)
- Injuries: 1
- Perpetrator: Francesco Villi

On December 18, 2022, a mass shooting occurred at the Bellaria Residences condominium tower in Vaughan, a city north of Toronto, Ontario, Canada. Six people were killed, including the gunman, 73-year-old Francesco Villi, who was shot and killed by responding police officers. Another person was hospitalized with serious but non-life-threatening injuries.

== Shooting ==
Officers responded to a report of an active shooting at an apartment building in Vaughan at around 7:20 p.m. Upon arrival, they discovered multiple victims. The building, known as Bellaria Residences, is located at 9235 Jane Street. The victims were found on several floors in the building, after the gunman appeared to target three separate units. The gunman was attempting to enter a unit on a separate floor from the victims when he was discovered by police.

The police officer who discovered the gunman initially believed he was a resident attempting to enter his apartment. However, when the gunman was challenged, he turned, revealing that he was holding a handgun. The police officer then challenged him again, ordering him not to move and to drop his weapon. The gunman raised his weapon and was fatally shot by the police officer.

The gunman, Francesco Villi, was identified as a resident of the building. He used a Beretta 92A1 semi-automatic handgun which he had legally purchased in 2019.

York Regional Police Chief Jim MacSween said that it was a "horrendous scene where numerous victims were deceased". One Toronto police constable told CNN that it was the "most terrible call I’ve seen in my entire career".

== Victims ==
All of the victims were residents of the building. The dead comprised three men and two women. They were Rita Camilleri, 57, and her husband Vittorio Panza, 79; Russell Manock, 75, and his wife Lorraine, 71; and Naveed Dada, 59.

A 66-year-old woman, Doreen Di Nino, was also seriously injured and hospitalized. Camilleri, Manock, and Dada were members of the condominium's board of directors.

== Perpetrator ==
Police identified the gunman as 73-year-old Francesco Villi (January 2, 1949 – December 18, 2022), a longtime house builder who was killed by police in a hallway on the third floor of the building. Some of the building's residents stated that Villi had been involved in a disagreement with the condominium's board of directors.

Villi had been living in Canada since both he and his mother had immigrated from his home country of Italy in 1966. In multiple videos shared on his social media accounts, Villi appeared to comment about the ongoing dispute with his condo. In 2014, Villi purchased a condo apartment. In 2015, he attempted to sell his condo apartment unsuccessfully, due to the recent completion of an adjacent new phase, which introduced numerous comparable condos with lower maintenance fees to the market. Consequently, the increased supply and competitive pricing from the new development created obstacles that prevented his condo sale.

In his videos, Villi said he worked as a home builder for 40 years. As a builder, he decided to pursue his condo corporation to fix his unit as required under the Ontario Condominium Act. Prior to the shooting, Villi stated that he was becoming sick from the electromagnetic waves coming off the electrical generator in the room beneath his unit. Villi stated his primary concern was achieving comfort in his home, a goal he sought to address through official channels. However, the judge in the case ruled that the statement of claim failed to set out a legal cause of action and struck the claim.

=== Legal proceedings timeline ===
A variety of documents obtained by CityNews suggested Villi had an ongoing dispute with the condo board prior to the shooting, and according to an Ontario court docket, Villi was due to appear in a courtroom the day after the shooting.

His battle with the board seemed to stem from a dispute about an electrical room in the building, below his unit. A lawyer’s letter stated that Villi "suffers daily from the excessive noises, odours, vibrations, and/or heat emanating" from the electrical room. He first complained about it in 2017 in an email to property management. The board investigated the allegations, asking the fire department to inspect the electrical room, as well as air quality experts and electricians. No one found a problem with Villi's unit.

Villi viewed the situation as a breach of trust and increasingly felt boxed in over the course of 2022. Villi's behaviour became increasingly erratic. He walked the halls of the condo at night, screaming. He told a front desk worker that he would soon be walking with a baseball bat. Four different property managers quit, one after one day on the job, where she had to lock herself in her office while Villi screamed at her through the door.

In late summer of 2018, the new property manager sent an email to the board asking them to add Villi's suite 104 to the agenda. The board president, Rita Camilleri, sent the rest of the board an email suggesting that they take legal action against Villi. John Di Nino became the condo board’s president in August 2018.

The decision in Villi v. Camilleri outlines the procedural history:

- In November 2018, the condominium corporation initiated an application against resident Villi at the Ontario Superior Court. The corporation asked the court to "restrain Mr. Villi's allegedly threatening, abusive, intimidating and harassing behaviour towards the Corporation's board of directors, property management, workers and residents of the condominium."
- In June 2019, Villi filed a separate application against the corporation concerning noise and vibration issues related to an electrical room located beneath his unit. In his last video, Villi stated that he presented hundreds of pages of official inspection reports as evidence, detailing how noise, vibration and electromagnetic field levels in his unit exceeded Ontario building code requirements and necessitated remediation.
- On October 24, 2019, Justice Perell converted the applications by the corporation and Villi into actions and consolidated them into one action to be heard in Newmarket. Perell also ordered Villi to refrain from recording board members, management, residents, or employees of the Corporation, to refrain from making social media posts about the proceedings and to only communicate with the Corporation in writing, except in an emergency.
- On December 15, 2020, Villi filed a statement of claim seeking a court order compelling the condominium corporation to complete a list of repairs identified in an inspector’s report and to award aggravated damages.
- On September 13, 2021, Justice Vallee found Villi in contempt of earlier orders issued by Justice Perell for continuing to communicate with condominium staff, contrary to court direction. She ordered Villi to pay the court costs of the condominium corporation, amounting to $29,500.
- On August 4, 2022, Justice Joseph Di Luca of the Ontario Superior Court struck Villi's statement of claim without leave to amend and declared him a vexatious litigant. Under Ontario civil procedure, a vexatious litigant designation prevents an individual from initiating further court proceedings or appeals without prior judicial authorization. This designation barred Villi from submitting any additional court applications concerning the condominium corporation's repair obligations under section 135 of the Condominium Act, 1998, without first seeking review of the application by a judge.

=== Procedural Issues in the Litigation ===
Court records identify several procedural issues that arose during Villi’s litigation with the condominium corporation. First, Villi did not submit expert opinion evidence to support his allegations concerning noise and vibration in his unit. Under the Canada Evidence Act and Ontario civil-procedure practice, technical matters—such as assessments of vibration levels or building-system performance—are generally established through qualified expert opinion reports. Villi relied on a municipal inspection document, which he considered sufficient, but no formal expert evidence was filed.

Second, after Condominium Corporation No. 1139 v. Villi and Villi v. Condominium Corporation No. 1139 were consolidated and transferred to another city, Villi commenced a new action in 2020 titled Villi v. Camilleri rather than amending his pleadings within the consolidated case. As a result, the subsequent steps proceeded under the newly opened civil action against individuals rather than the original claim against the condominium corporation. Precedents in disputes involving repair obligations under the Condominium Act, 1998 typically involve orders directed at the corporation rather than at individual board members or residents. In contrast, when proceedings are framed against individual persons—such as in Villi v. Camilleri—those individuals do not bear the statutory repair obligations that apply to condominium corporations.

A third issue concerned the evidence provided by the condominium corporation. The board president, John Di Nino, filed affidavits asserting that no vibration problem existed in Villi’s unit, but the corporation likewise did not submit expert opinion evidence or independent technical documentation.

Despite the limited technical evidence from both parties, the court ultimately accepted the corporation’s position in addressing the procedural matters before it and declared Villi as Vexatious Litigant.

=== Planned eviction and subsequent events ===
Court documents also show that Villi sued six directors and officers of the condominium board in 2020, alleging that the directors had deliberately caused him five years of "torment" and "torture", with reference to an electrical room beneath his apartment. He sought a total of $8,100,000 in damages. The judge struck the case in 2022, ruling that it was "frivolous and/or vexatious". He also gave Villi 30 days to pay $2,500 in court costs.

The condominium's board had obtained a restraining order against Villi in 2018. He was due to return to court on December 19 as the board sought to have him evicted for being a nuisance.

One day before the scheduled eviction motion, Villi fatally shot five condominium board members and injured another resident at the Bellaria Residences in Vaughan, Ontario. He was subsequently killed by responding police officers.

In response to the shooting incident, Villi's three estranged daughters issued a statement expressing their condolences, and also their shock and heartbreak at what had happened. They described their father as having "an aggressive, 'Jekyll and Hyde'-type personality".

== Aftermath ==
Ontario's Special Investigations Unit investigated the shooting and determined that there was no criminal wrongdoing by any police officers involved.

Condolences were offered by Vaughan mayor Steven Del Duca and Ontario premier Doug Ford. Del Duca also ordered all flags to fly at half-mast at all city buildings. Prime Minister Justin Trudeau issued a statement offering his condolences and his thanks for the response of first responders.

Over 150 people attended a candlelight vigil for the five victims, on the evening of December 21.
