= Sydney River McDonald's murders =

1992 robbery and mass shooting in Nova Scotia, Canada

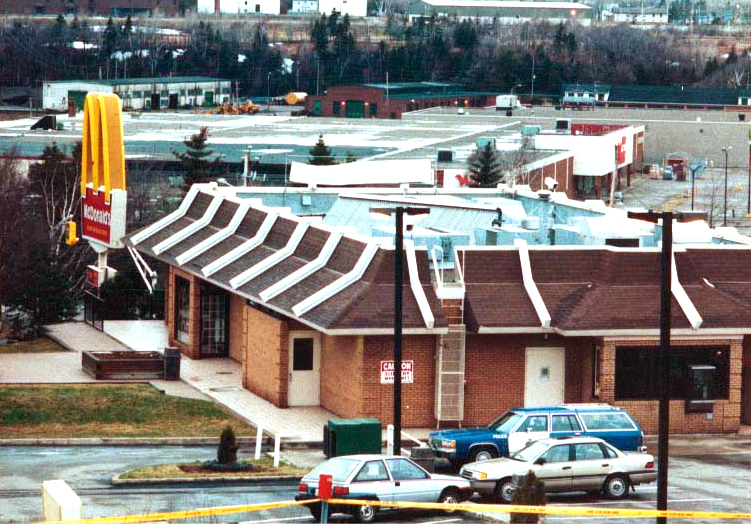
- Back of the restaurant on May 7, 1992, shortly after the discovery of the murders
- Location: 46.107623°N 60.224056°W; Sydney River, Nova Scotia, Canada
- Date: May 7, 1992; 12:50 am ADT (UTC-03:00)
- Attack type: Armed robbery; mass shooting
- Weapons: .22 calibre pistol; Knives; Shovel
- Deaths: 3
- Injuries: 1
- Perpetrators: Freeman Daniel MacNeil; Darren Muise; Derek Wood

The Sydney River McDonald's murders was a mass shooting and armed robbery that occurred on May 7, 1992, at a McDonald's restaurant in Sydney River, Nova Scotia, Canada.

The shooting and robbery left three people dead. The deceased victims were Neil Burroughs Jr., Jimmy Fagen, and Donna Warren. Arlene MacNeil survived her injuries, but was left permanently disabled. The shooters stole over $2,000 CAD from the restaurant's safe.

The early morning robbery and shooting was committed by three young men, with one of them, Derek Wood, working for the McDonald's restaurant. They were arrested about a week later and all were convicted by the end of 1993 in separate trials. Today both Freeman Daniel MacNeil and Darren Muise are out on parole while Wood remains incarcerated.

== Background ==
=== Victims ===
Neil Burroughs Jr., aged 29, was a maintenance worker that served at McDonald's restaurants in Industrial Cape Breton. He lived in Glace Bay with his wife and son. He was originally from the Cape Breton town of Dominion.

James "Jimmy" Fagan, aged 27, was a janitor from Sydney. He was arriving for his 1:00 a.m. shift when he was shot.

Donna Warren, aged 22, from North Sydney. She was the swing manager that night. She was a law student. She was the only one working that night that knew the combination to the safe where the money was stored.

== Robbery and murders ==
Derek Wood, 18, an employee of the restaurant along with two friends, Freeman Daniel MacNeil, 23, and Darren Muise, 18, broke into the restaurant after closing, planning to rob the establishment. They murdered their victims with a .22 calibre pistol, several knives, and a shovel. Arlene MacNeil survived after being shot in the face, but was left physically and intellectually disabled. She died in 2018. Forcing an employee to open the restaurant's safe, they made off with $2,017.

== Community response ==
The murders put Sydney into the spotlight as this became a national news story. The restaurant was in the shopping district of Sydney River on Kings Road. It reopened on May 14, 1992, after RCMP officers and psychologists accompanied staff in a walk-through. The restaurant was demolished in 2000 and moved down the road to a more accessible location.

== Trial and sentence ==
MacNeil and Wood were sentenced to life imprisonment with 25 years before parole eligibility. Muise received 20 years before parole eligibility.

=== Parole dispositions ===
On March 29, 2011, the National Parole Board announced their decision to grant Muise day parole. A member stated: "Given the significant and real progress you have made over the years, your case management team is of the opinion that the probability that you commit a crime after your release is low." He received full parole on November 22, 2012.

On December 29, 2022, McNeil was granted day parole. The National Parole Board had rejected an application for parole by Wood earlier that year, claiming he was "too high a risk to reoffend". On March 28, 2024, McNeil was granted full parole based on a "low to moderate" risk of reoffending, under the condition that he is prohibited from re-entering Nova Scotia unless permitted.
