= 1965 Coquitlam massacre =

Mass shooting

Coordinates: 49.2674°N 122.8421°W

- Location: Coquitlam, British Columbia, Canada
- Date: April 20, 1965; 1:30 a.m.
- Attack type: Mass shooting
- Weapon: .357 Magnum revolver
- Deaths: 8 (including the perpetrator)
- Perpetrator: Leonard Raymond Hogue

The 1965 Coquitlam massacre was a familicide that occurred in Coquitlam, British Columbia, Canada. Leonard Hogue shot his family and himself.

== Shooting ==
At approximately 1:30 a.m. on April 20, 1965, Leonard Hogue shot and killed his wife and six children with a .357 Magnum revolver. He then shot himself. Hogue's body was found on the master bedroom floor and his wife's in the bed. The bodies of two children lay in their beds, while the other four were in different areas of the house; they are believed to have attempted to flee. Everyone, including Hogue, was killed by a bullet to the head. The bodies were found on the same day after officials wondered why Hogue did not come to work.

== Perpetrator ==
Leonard Raymond Hogue moved from Saint Boniface, Manitoba (now part of Winnipeg) to Vancouver with his wife and two children. He graduated from the Vancouver Police Department in 1956 and was the pistol shooting champion of his class. He was initially a patrolman, and, after some time, he was transferred to the city prison. By 1961, he had six children.

In the early 1960s, Hogue and another police officer committed a series of thefts, stealing bags of cash from Dairy Queen freezers. Around the same time in the Vancouver area, a series of robberies were committed at the homes of wealthy people who were on vacation and reported their absence to the police. In November 1961, a gun shop was looted, and 14 guns were stolen. These were used in further robberies.

In 1962, Hogue and two other police officers robbed a bank. Hogue then bought a house in the affluent Coquitlam area.

In 1964 and 1965, Hogue and two others committed two unsuccessful robberies. Although the identities of all three remained unknown at that time, suspicions arose that police officers could be involved in the robbery. On February 11, 1965, Hogue and three other police officers robbed a train carrying banknotes for destruction, stealing $1.2 million. The bills were drilled with three-inch holes rendering them unusable. One of the robbers restored some of the bills, and on April 17, 1965, two robbers were arrested when a bartender called police after they consistently paid with patched bills. The next morning Hogue learned that three members of his gang had been arrested. On the way to work, he had an accident, later described as a suicide attempt. At around 6 pm, another police officer lent him a .357 magnum revolver. This revolver was used to kill the family.
