= Vernon massacre =

1996 mass shooting in Canada

- Location: Vernon, British Columbia, Canada
- Date: April 5, 1996
- Attack type: Mass shooting
- Weapons: .40-calibre Smith & Wesson semi-automatic pistol; .38-calibre Smith & Wesson revolver; 12-gauge pump-action shotgun (not used)
- Deaths: 10 (including the perpetrator)
- Injuries: 2
- Perpetrator: Mark Vijay Chahal

The Vernon massacre was a mass shooting that occurred in Vernon, British Columbia on April 5, 1996. At the time, it was the deadliest mass shooting in Canada since the École Polytechnique massacre in 1989.

== Shooting ==
At about 10:30 a.m. on April 5, 1996, 30-year-old Mark Vijay Chahal drove to his ex-wife's home, where one of her sisters was preparing for a wedding. Armed with a .40 calibre S&W semi-automatic pistol and a .38 calibre revolver in either hand, he shot his ex-wife's father in front of the house as he washed his car. He then fired at the windows of the house. After walking into the house, he went from room to room, fatally shooting his ex-wife Rajwar Gakhal, her mother, her four sisters, her brother, and the husband of one of the sisters. The eldest sister's mother-in-law and daughter were injured, and two granddaughters were left unharmed. Six of the victims died immediately, and three more died in the hospital. The shooting lasted 3-4 minutes. Two empty 10 round magazines and 28 revolver shell casings were found at the scene. After the shooting, Chahal drove to a motel 3 km (1.9 mi) away. At the motel, he wrote a note apologizing to his family for the shooting and writing several numbers of his relatives. At about 11 a.m., he shot himself in a motel. A 12-gauge pump-action shotgun was found in his car.

== Perpetrator ==
Mark Vijay Chahal, 30, was divorced by his wife in January 1995. His wife had repeatedly complained to the police about domestic violence. He also threatened her family that none of the daughters would marry. Chahal had no criminal record and all weapons were registered to him. Before the shooting, he exchanged his car for a rented van. Because of this, police speculated that he was planning to flee after the shooting.
