= List of vehicle-ramming attacks =

This is a list of vehicle-ramming attacks. A vehicle-ramming attack also known as a vehicle as a weapon or VAW attack, is an assault in which a perpetrator deliberately rams a vehicle into a building, multiple people, or another vehicle. (Note: Therefore this list excludes traffic accidents and hit and runs.)

According to Stratfor Global Intelligence analysts in 2008, this method of attack represented a relatively new militant tactic that could prove more difficult to prevent than suicide bombings. Deliberate vehicle-ramming into a crowd of people is a tactic often used by terrorists, becoming a major terrorist tactic in the 2010s because it requires relatively little skill to perpetrate and it has the potential to cause significant casualties.

== Terrorism ==
Attacks in which authorities confirmed that the attack was terrorism. The casualty counts excludes the attackers.

=== 2000s ===
- 2001 Azor attack, Israel (ramming people, mostly soldiers; 8 killed 26 injured; by Hamas)
- 2002 Lyon car attack, France (building ramming and fire; no injury; antisemitism)
- 2004 Granby Colorado rampage (modified bulldozer; no injury)
- 2006 UNC SUV attack, University of North Carolina, United States (ramming people; 9 injured)
- 2007 Glasgow Airport attack, Scotland (building ramming and detonating gas cylinders; 5 injured)
- 2008 Jerusalem bulldozer attack, Israel (ramming people; 3 killed 40 injured)
- 2008 Kashgar attack, China (ramming people, stabbing, exploding; 16 killed 16 injured)
- 2008 Jerusalem vehicular attack, Israel (ramming vehicles and people; 19 injured)
- 2009 Jerusalem bulldozer attack, Israel (ramming people; 2 police injured)

=== 2010s ===
- 2011 Tel Aviv truck attack, Israel (ramming vehicles and people; 1 killed 17 injured)
- 2011 Tel Aviv nightclub attack, Israel (ramming and stabbing; 8 injured)
- 2011 Kashgar attacks, China (ramming people, stabbing, exploding; 15 killed 42 injured)
- 2013 Murder of Lee Rigby, London, England, (ramming and stabbing; 1 killed 2 injured)
- 2013 Tiananmen Square attack, China (ramming people and bursting into flames; 2 killed 38 injured)
- 2014 Ürümqi attack, China (ramming and throwing bombs off the vehicle; 39 killed 90+ injured)
- 2014 Jerusalem tractor attack, Israel (ramming people and bus; 1 killed 7 injured)
- 2014 Saint-Jean-sur-Richelieu ramming attack, Canada (ramming; 1 killed 1 injured)
- October 2014 Jerusalem vehicular attack, Israel (ramming people; 2 killed)
- November 2014 Jerusalem vehicular attack, Israel (ramming and hitting with a metal crowbar)
- 2014 Alon Shvut stabbing attack, West Bank (failed ramming and stabbing)
- 2015 Saint-Quentin-Fallavier attack, France (ramming people, stabbing and bombings; 1 killed, 2 injured)
- 2016 Nice truck attack, France (86 killed 458 injured, ramming people and gunfire)
- 2016 Ohio State University attack, United States (ramming and stabbing)
- 2016 Berlin truck attack, Germany (shooting truck driver and ramming people; 13 killed)
- 2017 Jerusalem truck attack, Israel (ramming people; 4 killed)
- 2017 Westminster attack, London, England, United Kingdom (ramming and stabbing; some victims were thrown off Westminster Bridge by the ramming; 5 killed)
- 2017 Stockholm truck attack, Sweden (ramming people; 5 killed)
- 2017 London Bridge attack, England, United Kingdom (ramming and stabbing; 8 killed)
- 2017 Finsbury Park van attack, London, England, United Kingdom (ramming people; 1 killed)
- June 2017 Champs-Élysées car ramming attack, Paris, France (ramming a police car; 1 attacker killed)
- 2017 Levallois-Perret attack, Levallois-Perret, France (ramming soldiers; none killed)
- 2017 Barcelona attacks, Barcelona, Spain (ramming, stabbing and bombings; 16 killed 152 injured)
- 2017 Charlottesville attack, Charlottesville, Virginia, United States (ramming people; 1 killed)
- 2017 New York City truck attack, United States (ramming cyclists and runners; 8 killed)
- 2018 Tajikistan tourist attack, Tajikistan (ramming and stabbing; 4 killed 2 injured)
- 2018 Westminster car attack (ramming pedestrians and cyclists before crashing into security barriers; none killed)
- 2019 Pulwama attack (vehicle ramming and suicide bombing; 40 killed)
- 2019 Tokyo car attack (ramming, stabbing and attempted arson attacks 8 injured by vehicle, 1 by attacker)
- 2019 Woodfield Mall car attack, United States (ramming)

=== 2020s ===
- 2020 Colombes car attack
- 2021 London, Ontario, truck attack: 4 killed, 1 injured
- 2021 Yangon military vehicle attack, Yangon, Myanmar
- Waukesha Christmas parade attack
- 2022 Beersheba attack (ramming and stabbing)
- 2022 Berlin car attack: On 8 June 2022, a man drove his Renault Clio into a crowd of pedestrians on a sidewalk, killing one person and injuring thirty-two others.
- 2022 Ariel attack
- 2023 Guangzhou car attack
- 2023 Ramot Junction attack in Jerusalem
- 2023 Tel Aviv car-ramming
- July 2023 Tel Aviv attack
- 2024 Ra'anana attack On 15 January 2024 VAW and marauding terrorist attack killing 1 person and injuring 18.
- HaMatovichim Junction rampage: On 29 May 2024, a man drove his truck into two soldiers near Nablus, killing them both, before being arrested.
- Nir Tzvi intersection attack: On 14 July 2024, a man drove a car into a bus station in Nir Tzvi, killing an IDF officer and injuring three others before being killed.
- 2025 New Orleans truck attack, a pickup truck drove into a crowd in New Orleans, Louisiana, United States killing 14 people and injuring 57 others.
- 2025 Munich car attack, a car drove into trade union demonstration in Munich, Germany killing two people and injuring 37 others, including 10 severely.
- 2025 Karkur junction ramming attack: On Feb 27, 2025 a car drove into pedestrians waiting at a bus stop, killing one teenager and injuring 13.
- 2025 Manchester synagogue attack, a car is driven into pedestrians in Manchester, England during Yom Kippur, after which the assailant exits and begins stabbing worshippers at Heaton Park synagogue, killing 2 people and injuring at least 4 others.
- 2025 Island of Oléron car ramming, a car was driven into multiple pedestrians and cyclists in Oléron, injuring at least 5 people, 2 critically. The perpetrator attempted to set the car on fire, but was arrested while shouting "Allahu Akbar".
- 2026 Crown Heights, Brooklyn. A car was driven repeatedly into an entrance of the Chabad World Headquarters.
- 2026 Berlin Pride van attack. An Islamist terrorist drove a van into a crowd of pedestrians during Berlin Pride, killing 1 person and injuring 29 others.
- August 2026: A 26-year-old Russian drove a car into a crowd of pedestrians in Caen, killing 2 persons and injuring 9 others.

== Other ==
Incidents where a motive could not be determined, or a known motive was not of a terrorist nature.

=== Before 1980 ===
- 1935 Revolution Day Zócalo Battle, Horses ridden by the Revolutionary Mexicanist Action were quickly rammed by a small fleet of cars driven by Communist party drivers who had banded together secretly. A number of horses and their riders were injured and collapsed on the pavement.
- 1953 Elias Antonio case, Bento Ribeiro, Rio de Janeiro, Brazil: Syrian merchant killed one person and wounded up to 29 others during a carnival
- 1960 Campo Alegre bus attack: a bus struck a group of people honoring Nossa senhore das Gracas. 23 dead and 40+ injured the perpetrator was identified as Manuel Da Mota Silveira
- 1964 Taipei ramming attack: three dead
- 1973 Olga Hepnarová case, Prague, Czechoslovakia; 8 dead, 12 injured.
- 1973 Plains vehicle-ramming attack (people)

=== 1980s ===
- 1980 Priscilla Ford drove her Lincoln Continental into pedestrians on a sidewalk in Reno, Nevada on 27 November. Six people were killed and twenty-three others were injured.
- 1980 Wantagh attack (ramming people)
- 1982 Beijing attack (ramming people). 5 dead, 19 injured.
- 1982 Langfang attack (ramming and stabbing). 13 dead, 17 injured.
- 1983 Changde massacre (ramming people). 21 dead, 29 injured.
- 1983 Douglas Crabbe drove a 25-tonne Mack truck into the crowded bar of a motel at the base of Uluru on 18 August 1983. Five people were killed, and sixteen were seriously injured.
- 1983 Beirut barracks bombings, Lebanon (building ramming and exploding)
- 1984 Baldo tragedy, Brazil (ramming people). 19 killed 12 injured.
- 1984 Los Angeles attack (ramming people)

=== 1990s ===
- 1993 Acahay Massacre.
- 1993 Jacarepaguá attack (ramming people)
- 1993 Santiago, Chile: On 20 September, a Navy captain deliberately rammed his car into random citizens along the Huérfanos street in Central Santiago, killing 2 and injuring 5 before crashing into a phone pole. The following year, he was declared not guilty by reason of insanity due to suffering from maniac depressive psychosis (now known as bipolar disorder).
- 1994 – An off duty Federal Express pilot Auburn Calloway attacks the pilots of Federal Express Flight 705 and attempts to take over the plane so that he can crash into the airport. He is stopped by the pilots.
- 1995 New York City attack (ramming and stabbing).
- 1995 Shawn Nelson case, a plumber using a stolen tank to go on a rampage in San Diego
- 1998 Alma rampage – Murder and vehicle attack on town
- 1998 Putian 26-day spree ramming.
- 1999 Emiko Taira (mother of Japanese pop singer Namie Amuro) and her husband Tatsunobu Taira were walking along a road near National Highway No. 58 in Ōgimi, Okinawa Prefecture, Japan when Tatsunobu's brother Kenji Taira backed his car into a telephone pole and ran over the couple on 17 March 1999. Emiko Taira was killed. Kenji Taira later committed suicide.
- 1999 Shimonoseki Station massacre (ramming and stabbing)

=== 2000s ===
- 2001 The Hamptons rampage, socialite Lizzie Grubman rams into a crowd outside a club with SUV (16 injured).
- 2001 Kampala attack (ramming people)
- 2001 Dalian attack (ramming people). 1 dead, and 18 were injured.
- 2001 Shenzhen attack (ramming and stabbing). 8 dead and 4−7 injured.
- 2001 Isla Vista killings David Attias drove into five people killing four and injuring one other. The one survivor unfortunately died from their injuries in 2016. The attack took place 13 years before the 2014 Isla Vista killings
- 2002 New York City attack (ramming people).
- 2002 San Cristóbal Ecatepec attack (ramming people).
- 2003 Düsseldorf attack (ramming people)
- 2003 A psychologically unstable person kills one and hurts eighteen in Stockholm's old town. A second death later occurs in a hospital.
- 2005 Las Vegas attack (ramming people)
- 2006 Dublin attack (ramming people)
- 2006 Berlin attack (ramming people during soccer championship, found insane)
- 2006 Shenzhen attack (ramming and stabbing)
- 2006 San Francisco SUV rampage, 2006 case of a paranoid schizophrenic man from Afghanistan using an SUV to go on a rampage
- 2007 Berrwiller attack (ramming people)
- 2008 Akihabara massacre, mass murder using a truck and a dagger
- 2009 attack on the Dutch royal family (ramming people, attempt to attack the Dutch royals including the reigning monarch; 8 killed)
- 2010 Zhengzhou attack (ramming people). 6 dead, 20 injured.

=== 2010s ===
- 2010 Yuanshi County tractor attack, 2010 mass murder using a bucket loader
- 2011 Porto Alegre, Brazil attack, cyclists rammed.
- 2011 Changsha attack (ramming people). 5 dead, 5 injured.
- 2012 Pune attack (ramming people)
- 2012 Zhangjiajie attack (ramming people). 6 dead, 9 injured.
- Matthew Tvrdon, under a psychotic episode, got angry with a woman and began ramming her and numerous pedestrians with his van over eight miles for 30 minutes, killing Karina Menzies and injuring 12 others. He admitted manslaughter on the grounds of diminished responsibility and is detained indefinitely under the Mental Health Act.
- 2012 Fengning attack (ramming people)
- 2013 Tumon
- 2013 Venice, Los Angeles (one dead)
- 2014 Venezuelan protests, several cases of vehicle ramming during opposition protests by government supporters.
- 2014 Isla Vista attacks; Vehicle ramming attack, Stabbings, Shootings. 7 Dead.
- 2014 Sopot attack, Poland (ramming people)
- 2014 Taipei attack against Presidential Office Building, Taiwan
- 2014 Huaiwangtan attack (ramming and stabbing)
- 2014 Balipo attack (ramming and stabbing)
- 2014 Dijon attack, France (ramming people)
- 2014 Nantes attack, France (ramming people)
- 2015 Graz car attack, mass murder using an SUV and a knife
- 2015 Weifang attack (ramming people). 5 dead, 21 injured.
- 2015 Shuozhou attack (ramming people)
- 2015 Oklahoma State University homecoming parade attack
- 2015 Edmonton, Alberta, Canada. On 18 November, a man rammed his truck into a Petro-Canada gas station, injuring four people.
- 2016 Yichun attack (ramming people). 4 dead, 18 injured.
- 2016 Kalamazoo bicycle crash, 5 dead
- 2016 Scunthorpe road rage
- 2017 Venezuelan protests, several cases of vehicle rammings during opposition protests by security forces or government supporters, including the killing of Paúl Moreno.
- January 2017 Melbourne car attack in Melbourne, Australia, in which six people were killed and 27 injured.
- 2017 Balneário Camboriú road rage
- 2017 Murder of Yadira Arroyo, EMT ran over and killed by mentally ill man in New York City
- 2017 Times Square car attack
- 2017 Heidelberg, Germany: 1 dead, two injured
- 2017 Müllrose, Germany, drug addict kills two police officers while fleeing in stolen car after stabbing his grandmother to death
- 2017 Antwerp attack, failed car-ramming in Belgium
- 2017 Guatemala City, a car rammed into a student protest: 13 injured, one dead.
- 2017 Sandy, Utah attack, car-ramming and shooting: two dead, two injured
- 2017 Jingjiang car attack (ramming people). 4 dead, 9 injured.
- 2017 Columbia, South Carolina: (ramming people): 12 injured
- July 2017 Helsinki attack, Finland, ramming people
- August 2017 Helsinki attack, Finland, failed ramming: one injured
- 2017 Chomutov incident, the Czech Republic, in which a driver was shot dead by an armed citizen after driving into a group of people
- 2017 Sept-Sorts car attack, France, ramming a pizzeria, killing a schoolgirl
- 2017 Marseille van attack, France. A van rammed into two bus stops killing one woman and injuring another.
- 2017 Edmonton attack, Canada (ramming + stabbing; none killed)
- December 2017 California attack, United States, (ramming immigrant rights demonstrators, 6 injured)
- December 2017 Melbourne car attack (ramming and stabbing, 1 killed, 18 injured)
- December 2017 car attack in Perth, Australia, with one dead, four injured, three seriously.
- February 2018 car attack in Perth, Australia, with two injured, in suburban Mullaloo.
- 2018 Münster vehicle ramming (ramming crowd at an outdoor café, killing four and injuring 20; perpetrator then took his own life)
- 2018 Toronto van attack (ramming people; 11 killed and 15 injured)
- 2018 Gravesend, Kent, England (ramming people): 13 injured
- 2018 Bessemer City, North Carolina, United States (vehicle ramming): 2 dead, 3 injured
- 2018 Yantai attack (ramming people): 1 dead, 10 injured.
- 2018 Liuzhou attack (ramming and stabbing). 6 dead, 12 injured.
- 2018 Moscow, Russia: 1 man died, 9 were injured.
- 2018 Mishui vehicle attack (ramming people at a square, killing 15 people and injuring 43 others; perpetrator sentenced to death)
- 2018 Ningbo, Zhejiang, China (ramming and stabbing): 3 dead, 15 injured.
- 2018 Brăila, Romania (ramming and stabbing): Ten injured. Attacker was under effects of drugs.
- 2018 Newport, Wales: 4 injured on 29 April when a teen driver smashed into a crowd outside a nightclub claiming to try to stop a brawl, then fled and set his car on fire. He was found guilty of two counts of grievous bodily harm with intent, while two other teens pled guilty for their role in instigating the fight which preceded the attack.
- 2018 Huludao vehicle ramming (ramming people). 6 dead, 17 injured.
- 2019 Zaoyang car attack (ramming and stabbing). 6 dead, 8 injured.
- 2019 Sunnyvale, California, United States (ramming group of pedestrians). 8 injured.
- 2019 Taneytown, Maryland (ramming building)
- Bottrop and Essen car attack (ramming people): 14 injured.
- 2019 San Pedro de la Paz, Chile: On 18 October, during the 2019 Chilean protests, 34-year-old Mario Alejandro Navarrete Concha deliberately drove into protesters while drunk, killing 2 and injuring 19. He was later sentenced to 7 years' imprisonment.

=== 2020s ===
- 2020 Volkmarsen ramming attack: On 24 February 2020, a 29-year-old man rammed his car against civilians at a carnival parade in Volkmarsen, Germany, wounding 89 people. The driver had no known mental illness and was not intoxicated at the time, with prosecutors alleging that he acted out of frustration with life.
- March 2020, Ohio: On 21 March, Springdale Police Department officer Kaia Grant was intentionally struck and killed while laying spike strips. Terry Blankenship pleaded guilty to the attack in April 2011 and was sentenced to 30 years to life.
- 2020 Wan Chai attack, Hong Kong (a motorcyclist rammed his motorcycle into police officers)
- 2020 July 6 Seattle: During a protest against police brutality and the murder of George Floyd 1 dead and 1 injured
- August 2020 attack: Iraqi chases motor cyclists on Berlin's A100; trial for attempted murder to begin 15 April.
- 2020 Henstedt-Ulzburg, Schleswig-Holstein, Germany: On 17 October 2020, four people were injured when a 22-year-old man drove into a group protesting a political rally of the Alternative for Germany. The driver was charged with attempted manslaughter.
- 2020 Trier attack: Six people were killed and 23 were injured after a drunk man, who suffered from mental health problems, rammed civilians on a street.
- 2020 Negohot, Israel 1 Israeli soldier was wounded, and the assailant was shot dead.
- 2021 Portland, Oregon, United States: On 24 January 2021, one pedestrian is killed and five others wounded. Driver arrested.
- 2021 Damascus, Syria: On 24 January 2021, 44-year-old Aline Skaf, wife of Hannibal Gaddafi and daughter-in-law of Libyan dictator Muammar Gaddafi hits five people - two policemen and three pedestrians, in an act of road rage from a parking ticket after illegally parking at the side of the road.
- 2021 United States Capitol car attack: On 2 April 2021, a car ramming occurred outside the United States Capitol, killing a police officer and injuring another. Police shot and killed the perpetrator shortly after.
- 2021 Dalian car attack 5 people killed and 8 injured in Dalian, China (22 May 2021). The driver was going 108 km/h (67 mph) during a pedestrian crossing. The perpetrator was caught and tried after.
- Killing of Deona Marie Knajdek: A driver killed one person and injured three on 13 June 2021, in the U.S. city of Minneapolis.
- June 2021 Fort Lauderdale, Florida Pride Parade: A pickup truck driver killed one person and injured another on 19 June 2021. All three individuals were connected with the Fort Lauderdale Gay Men's Chorus.
- June 2021 Show Low, Arizona Bicycle Race: A driver struck 7 cyclists. The driver fled the scene and was pursued and shot by police.
- 2021 Novara, Italy. A driver intentionally rammed his truck into workers protesting outside a market on the morning of 18 June 2021, during a protest outside a supermarket in Novara, Piedmont, Italy. One worker, Adil Belakhdim, was killed, and two others were wounded. The driver escaped from the scene but was arrested minutes later.
- 2021 Lakhimpur Kheri violence: Eight killed in farmers' protest in Lakhimpur Kheri district; Ashish Mishra, the son of Union Minister of State Ajay Mishra, was allegedly driving one of the three cars.
- 2021 Waukesha Christmas parade attack: Darrell Brooks, of Milwaukee, broke through barricades with a red SUV and drove through the annual Waukesha Christmas parade, killing six people and injuring 62 others. Brooks was charged with 81 felony and two misdemeanor counts.
- February 2022: "A 42yr old male is facing charges after driving through a group of protesters that were part of the Freedom Convoy at the Legislative grounds," the Winnipeg Police tweeted. "4 adult males were struck."
- 2022 Queens, New York, United States. On 10 August, a person drove their SUV into a beer delivery worker and a mother and her child before driving away. No arrests were made.
- 2023 Laval daycare bus crash: A 51-year-old Société de transport de Laval (STL) bus driver, crashed his bus into a daycare in Laval, Quebec, killing two children and injuring six.
- Brooklyn, New York, United States: 62-year-old Malaysian national Weng Sor drove a rented U-Haul truck into pedestrians in Brooklyn, killing 1 and injuring nine. He was placed on suicide watch after his arrest.
- 2023 Amqui truck attack: A 38-year-old rammed his pickup truck against pedestrians in Amqui, Quebec, killing three people and injuring eight.
- 2023 Nottingham attacks
- 2023 London On 26 May 2023, a man drove into the closed gates of 10 Downing Street. The driver had posted a video online stating that politicians "had to pay". He was arrested and charged with dangerous driving and possession of child sexual abuse material.
- 2023 vehicle ramming attack on Bourke Street, Melbourne (White Toyota sedan goes into crowd killing one and injuring many).
- October 2023: Man drives car into the Chinese consulate in San Francisco
- November 2023: A man drove a car into the Israeli embassy in Tokyo
- 2024 Rochester attack: On 1 January 2024 a man drove into a vehicle outside a theater, killing him and three occupants of the other vehicle. The driver's vehicle was found to be laden with gas canisters in it.
- 2024 Szczecin, Poland: On 1 March 2024 a man intentionally hit in a group of pedestrians at a road crossing at the Rodło Square. The driver of the car did not stop and a kilometer later he collided with three cars. 20 people were injured and one died. The perpetrator of the collision was referred for psychiatric examination.
- 2024 Texas Department of Public Safety building truck attack: On 12 April 2024 a man intentionally drove a semi-truck into a Texas Department of Public Safety office, killing two people and injuring 12 others. The day prior, the man had failed to get his commercial driver's license renewed at the same office.
- 2024 Zhuhai car attack: On 11 November 2024, a man drove a small SUV onto a running track out of Zhuhai Stadium in Zhuhai, killing 38 people and injuring 48 others exercising on the track. The driver was motivated by an acrimonious divorce settlement.
- 2024 Changde car attack: a 39-year-old man drove into crowd outside a primary school when students were going to school in the morning. 30 people were injured including 18 pupils.
- 2024 Magdeburg car attack. On 20 December 2024, an attack on a Christmas Market, killed 6 people and 309 others were injured. The Preparator was identified as 50-year-old Saudi-born anti-Islam activist Taleb Al-Abdulmohsen at the scene.
- 2024 London, England: At 00:45 a.m. on 25 December 2024, Christmas Day, a car was driven into five pedestrians along the wrong side of the road of Shaftesbury Avenue in Westminster, with one pedestrian dying of his injuries. The 30-year-old suspect was intoxicated and targeted the victims "for racist and homophobic reasons".
- 2025 Nelson, New Zealand. On New Year's Day, a 32-year-old man drove his car into two New Zealand police officers and a police car, killing one officer and injuring four others, including one seriously.
- 2025 Tampa, Florida, United States. On 26 January 2025, a 48-year-old man struck groups of pedestrians in two locations, killing one person and injuring six others, before being fatally shot by police officers after a highspeed chase.
- 2025 Mannheim car attack: On 3 March 2025, two people were killed and eleven others including the driver were injured when a man drove into a group of people in Paradeplatz, a pedestrianized street in Mannheim. The driver was arrested and believed to have acted out of frustration with his personal life, exacerbated by borderline personality disorder.
- 2025 Inglewood, California, United States. On 8 March 2025, a disgruntled customer drove his car into a CarMax car dealership building, injuring eight people, including two critically, before being arrested.
- 2025 Vadodara, Gujarat, India. On 14 March, a man rammed his car into pedestrians, killing a woman and injuring eight others, before being arrested.
- 2025 Yang, Beijing, China. On 18 March, a man angry with the government drove his car into a vegetable market, killing five people and injuring eleven others.
- 2025 Luton, Bedfordshire, England. On 6 April, a 23-year-old man drove his Fiat 500 into pedestrians, injuring two people, before being arrested.
- 2025 East Naples, Florida, United States. On 10 April 2025, a 42-year-old man drove his car into a thrift store, injuring six people, before being arrested after attempting to flee the scene.
- 2025 Toronto, Ontario, Canada. On 15 April, a person drove their sedan onto a pedestrian walkway on the Toronto Metropolitan University campus near Yonge Street and Gerrard Street injuring four people. No arrests were made.
- 2025 Jinhua car attack. On 22 April, a car drove into pedestrians, mostly students walking home from school, outside of an elementary school in Jinhua, Zhejiang, China. 14 people, including nine students, police officers and parents, were killed while multiple others were seriously injured.
- 2025 Vancouver car attack. On 26 April, Kai-Ji Adam Lo, 30, drove his Audi Q7 SUV through the Filipino Lapu Lapu festival before being taken into police custody. At least eleven people were killed, including a child, while more than 20 others were injured.
- 2025 Osaka, Kansai, Japan. On 1 May, a 28-year-old man drove his car into a crowd of students going home from school, injuring seven people, before being arrested.
- 2025 Sullivan's Island, South Carolina, United States. On 1 May, a man armed with a knife drove his car into two children and an adult, before being arrested later.
- May 2025, Hamilton County, Ohio, United States: On 2 May, Hamilton County Sheriff's Deputy Larry Henderson was struck and killed while directing traffic. Rodney Hinton Jr. was charged with killing Henderson in retaliation for his son Ryan Hinton's shooting death by police a day earlier. Henderson was not involved in the shooting that killed Ryan.
- 2025 Champs-Élysées, Paris, France. On 7 May, a car drove into a crowd of French association football team Paris Saint-Germain FC supporters, injuring three people, including two critically, before the driver was attacked and his car was set on fire and later exploded.
- 2025 Paris, France. On 11 May, a car carrying three people rammed into and robbed a Louis Vuitton store, stealing luxury items and causing damage, before fleeing the scene.
- 2025 Bishopville, South Carolina, United States. On 11 May, a teenager drove his car into a girl before crashing into a Dollar Tree store and a car during a dispute with five people, injuring the girl, before being arrested.
- 2025 New Bedford, Massachusetts, United States. On 12 May, a woman drove her car into the entrance of a federal building, striking a security guard and causing minor damage to the building, before being arrested after getting out and trying to light an American flag on fire with gasoline.
- 2025 Liverpool parade attack, on 26th May a 53-year-old man drove a Ford Galaxy into a crowd in Liverpool, England celebrating Liverpool FC's 2024-25 Premier League victory, injuring 130 people. The attack was initially feared to be terrorist, but was later determined to be due to the driver experiencing a fit of road rage at being obstructed by the crowd.
- 2025 Fengxiang District, Shaanxi, China. On 2 June, the secretary of the Dongguan Community Party Branch, 54-year-old Zhang Moufeng, drove her car into two pedestrians on an electric bicycle after a personal dispute at the intersection of Yongxing Road, seriously injuring them, before being arrested.
- 2025 Vancouver, British Columbia, Canada. On 5 June, a 30-year-old man drove his car into the main entrance of the Pacific Coliseum at high speed during a Cirque du Soleil performance before being arrested.
- 2025 Passau, Lower Bavaria, Bavaria, Germany. On 7 June, a 48-year-old Iraqi national drove his Mercedes-Benz into a crowd after a possible custody dispute, injuring five people including his 40-year-old wife and 5-year-old child, before being detained.
- 2025 Culpeper, Virginia, United States. On 14 June, a 21-year-old man intentionally drove his car into a "No Kings" protest, hitting at least one person.
- June 2025, Louisiana: On 16 June, Baton Rouge Police Department officer Caleb Eisworth was struck on his motorcycle while on the way home. Eisworth died two months later. Gad Black was charged with the attack but deemed incompetent to stand trial. Black referenced Rodney Hinton Jr. in a Facebook post following the attack.
- 2025 Hollywood, Los Angeles, California, United States. On 19 July, a car attack left 30 injured after the driver rammed into a crowd waiting to enter a concert.
- 2025 Wuhan, Hubei, China. On 6 September, a 24-year-old man drove his car into pedestrians at the intersection of Hualou Street and Jiaotong Road, injuring seven people, before being arrested.
- 2025 Pittsburgh, Pennsylvania, United States. On 17 September, a 34-year-old man from Penn Hills, Pennsylvania rammed his white Toyota Corolla into a fence leading to Federal Bureau of Investigation building in Pittsburgh, before hanging an American flag and being placed in custody afterward. Police reported that the man has a history of mental health issues.
- 2026 Los Angeles ramming attack. On 11 January, a suspect drove a U-Haul truck into an anti-Iranian regime protest.
- 2026 Nevada substation attack: On 20 February, a vehicle-ramming terrorist attack targeted a substation operated by the Los Angeles Department of Water and Power (LADWP) near Boulder City, Nevada. The perpetrator died from a self-inflicted gunshot wound.
- 2026 Beijing ramming attack. On 29 March, a man drove a bulldozer into a market in Fangshan, Beijing, resulting in an unknown number of casualties.
- 2026 Chengdu ramming attack On 1 May 2026, in the Chengdu Hi-Tech Industrial Development Zone in Chengdu, China, a car driver collided with a pedestrian and fled the scene, subsequently ramming into multiple other vehicles and pedestrians, resulting in one death and 11 injuries.
- 2026 Leipzig car incident. On 4 May a driver rammed pedestrians in Grimmaische Strasse, Leipzig, resulting in two deaths and 22 injuries, German authorities believe the car ramming was deliberate.
- 2026 Modena car-ramming attack. On May 16, 2026, a driver deliberately rammed pedestrians in Modena, Italy, injuring seven people and later attacking and wounding a pedestrian with a knife during his escape.
- 2026 Mersin shootings
- June 2026, New Jersey. On 22 June, a protestor outside Delaney Hall was struck by a vehicle. Thomas K. Brown was charged with assault and reckless driving two days later.
- July 2026, Germany. At the Berlin CSD parade, a 21 year old Islamist drove a rented car into the crowd, killing one woman.
- 26 August 2026, Caen, France. A 26 year old man of Russian-Chechen descent known as Ibrahim I. rammed his car into a crowd after an argument with people in a bar, killing 2 and injuring 9 (some severely).
- 19 October 2026, Wangaratta, Australia. A 43 year old man rammed his SUV twice into Independent Federal Australian MP Helen Haines in an alleged targeted attack.
