= 2025 Jinhua car attack =

Vehicle-ramming attack in Jinhua, China

- Location: Sumeng Township Central Primary School, Jinhua, Zhejiang, China
- Date: April 22, 2025 c. 5:45 p.m. (CST)
- Target: Elementary students and school staff
- Attack type: Vehicle-ramming attack
- Weapon: Sedan
- Deaths: 6-14
- Injuries: 2-12+
- Motive: Revenge for the driver's child dying at the school

On April 22, 2025, a vehicle-ramming attack took place at an elementary school in Jinhua, Zhejiang, China, when a woman drove her car into pedestrians, killing multiple people and seriously injuring more than a dozen others. Among the victims were officers, parents, and nine students.

== Background ==
The attack occurred five months after the 2024 Zhuhai car attack that killed 38 people and injured 48 others, the 2024 Changde car attack, which also took place at a school, injuring 30 people, and the 2024 Wuxi stabbing at the Wuxi Vocational Institute of Arts and Technology that killed eight people and injured 17 others. The perpetrators of the Zhuhai and Wuxi attacks were executed in January 2025, while the perpetrator of the Changde attack received a suspended death sentence in December 2024.

== Attack ==
At around 5:45 p.m. a driver in a silver sedan rammed into a crowd of pedestrians and a row of flowerbeds at a high speed without slowing down on a road at the gate of the Sumeng Township Central Primary School while students and staff were heading home. Multiple people were struck and fell to the ground on impact, and some were stuck under the car, with bystanders being too weak to help and victims struggling to stand up. Bystanders banged on the car's window. Witnesses posted footage of the crash to Twitter. At the time of the attack, the intensive care unit at the local hospital was full. Authorities restricted access to the school by closing off roads around the school.

== Victims ==
Teacher Li Is Not Your Teacher reported seven people were killed and more than a dozen others were injured. Other sources reported anywhere from 6-14 people were killed. Authorities are restricting information and have not confirmed any casualty figures but acknowledged that the incident did occur. Jinhua Maternal and Child Health Hospital stated that they were treating two injured individuals from the incident.

== Suspect ==
A person in a group chat of a class at the school claimed the vehicle involved in the attack was driven by a local woman with a Guizhou license plate. The person and residents also said her child died in a crash while studying at the school, and she was dissatisfied with the way the school handled it, so she did the attack in revenge.

== Responses and reactions ==
Former state media reporter Wang Zhi'an made social media posts suggesting possible intentional targeting. Chinese sources claim the attack was intentional and the motive was revenge.

Authorities tried to block the news and called the incident a traffic accident. The police checked the dashcams of every parent of the school and asked them to delete it. Chinese articles and posts about the incident were also deleted shortly after being published.

== See also ==
- 2024 Zhuhai car attack
- 2024 Changde car attack
- 2024 Wuxi stabbing
