= 2008 Jerusalem BMW attack =

Terrorist attack in Jerusalem

- Location of Jerusalem
- Location: 31°46′44″N 35°13′30″E; Jerusalem
- Date: 22 September 2008; 18 years ago
- Attack type: Vehicle-ramming attack
- Weapon: BMW saloon car
- Deaths: 1 assailant
- Injuries: 19
- Assailant: Qassem Mughrabi
- No. of participants: 1

On 22 September 2008, a Palestinian drove a BMW saloon car into a group of civilians and off-duty soldiers in a terrorist ramming attack in Jerusalem, injuring 19 people. Stratfor Global Intelligence analysts say this attack represents a new terrorist tactic which is less lethal but could prove more difficult to prevent than suicide bombing.

== Background ==
The attack was a third in a series of terrorist attacks in Jerusalem involving a new tactic, using vehicles as weapons; the others were the 2 July 2008 Jerusalem bulldozer attack and a similar attack with a Backhoe loader on 22 July. The Jerusalem Post has termed them "ramming terror attacks." According to Stratfor, the American global intelligence firm, "while not thus far as deadly as suicide bombing", this tactic could prove more difficult to prevent. No single group has claimed responsibility for the incidents.

On 2 July 2008, Husam Tayseer Dwayat, an Arab Israeli citizen from the Sur Baher neighborhood of East Jerusalem drove an earthmover along Jaffa Road in West Jerusalem, slamming into a bus and passing cars. Four people were killed and another 45 were injured.

Later that month, on 22 July 2008, Ghassan Abu Tir, from the Umm Tuba neighborhood of East Jerusalem, drove a front-loader into traffic on King David Street in West Jerusalem, slamming into a bus and passing cars. Sixteen people were injured.

Patrick Martin, writing in The Globe and Mail in 2016, discussed this attack as an example of copycat terrorism.

== The attack ==
On 22 September 2008, the assailant, Qassem Mughrabi (alt. Qasim al-Mughabi), a 19-year-old Palestinian resident of East Jerusalem's Jabal Mukaber neighborhood, drove a black BMW saloon into a group of civilians and off-duty soldiers standing on a Jerusalem street. Nineteen people were injured.

Mughrabi was shot dead at the scene by off-duty soldier Lt. Elad Amar. Amar told Army Radio that the attacker "drove towards the soldiers at top speed, plowed onto the traffic island, ran over soldiers and civilians and then continued, ramming into a building. At that point I assessed that it was a terror attack and decided to neutralize the driver so that he wouldn't be able to reverse the car and continue the attack."

== The assailant ==
According to the Palestinian Ma'an news agency, Qassem Mughrabi was a member of Hamas. Mughrabi's family denied that the event was a terror attack. Mahmoud Mughrabi, Qassem's father, said his son did not have a driving license and apparently lost control of the car. "My son was murdered, they killed him. He did not carry out a terrorist attack. This was a car accident." However, police spokesman Micky Rosenfeld said authorities were convinced the attack was politically motivated. "We're 100 percent sure ... he deliberately drove into people," Rosenfeld said.

A number of Israeli Members of Parliament called for the demolition of the home of the assailant, as a means of discouraging future attacks.

== Vehicle ramming as a trend ==
This was one of a small cluster of terrorist vehicle-ramming attacks in Jerusalem in this period. Articles in New York Magazine, Breitbart News, Haaretz, The Times of Israel, and other publications cite this attack as harbingers of the terrorist vehicle-ramming attacks that would occur in many countries during the 2010s.

== See also ==
- 2006 San Francisco SUV rampage
