= 2026 Modena car-ramming attack =

Vehicle-ramming and stabbing in Italy

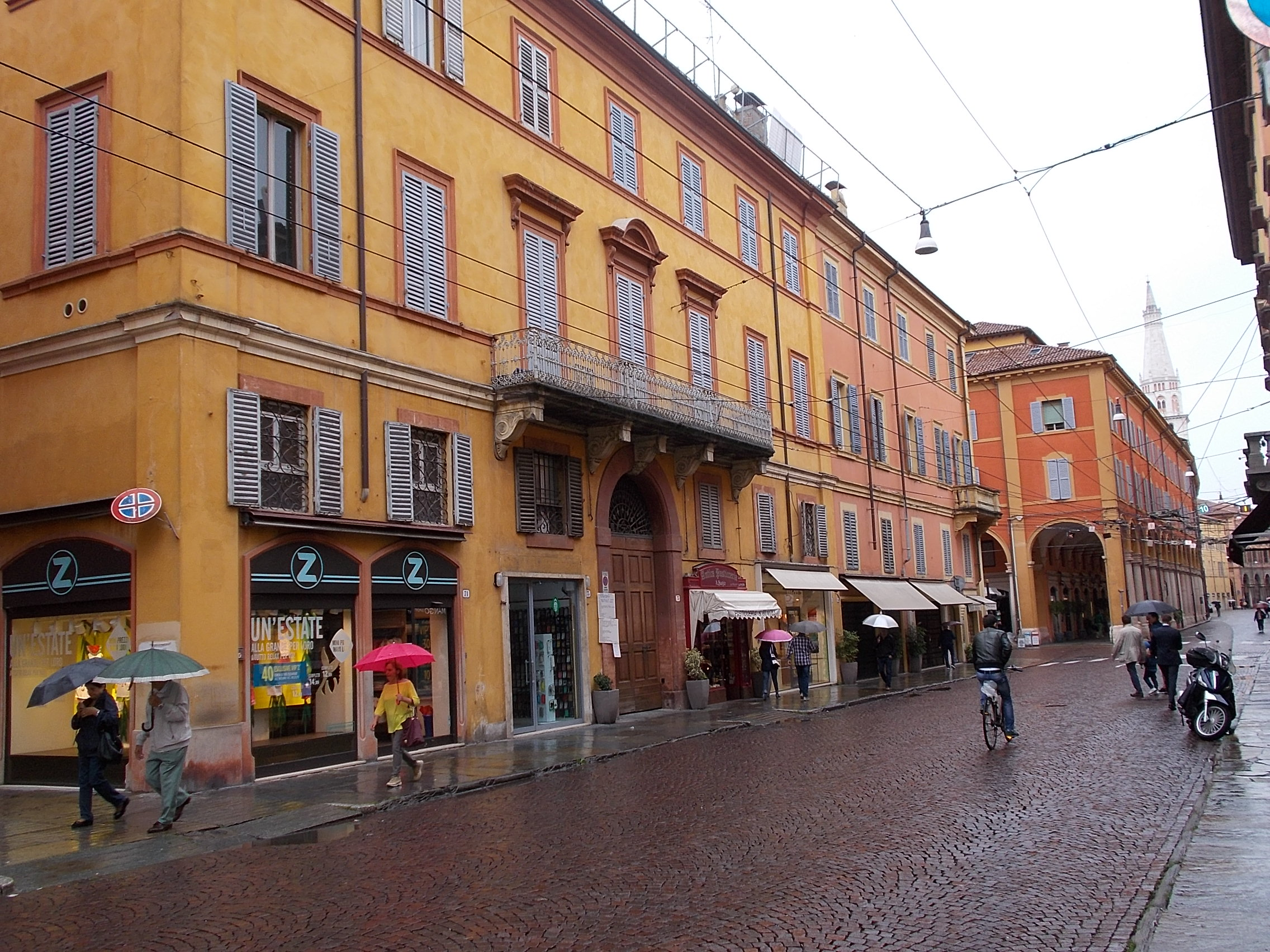
- via Emilia, the street in which the attack happened
- Location: Modena, Italy
- Date: 16 May 2026
- Target: Civilians
- Attack type: Vehicle-ramming, stabbing
- Weapons: Citroën C3 (second generation); Knife
- Deaths: 1
- Injuries: 7
- Perpetrator: Salim El Koudri
- Motive: Unknown

On May 16, 2026, a driver deliberately rammed pedestrians in Modena, Italy, injuring seven people and then attacking and wounding a pedestrian with a knife during his escape. One of the injured died of her wounds two months later.

== Attack ==
At approximately 16:30, a person in a grey Citroën C3 drove at a high speed (roughly 100km/h), hitting a person on a bicycle on the road before driving onto the sidewalk, colliding with a group of pedestrians. The impact was so violent that people were thrown into the air. Then the car left the sidewalk and partially hit a pedestrian crossing the road, before it continued straight and curving towards the sidewalk on the opposite side, accelerating to try to hit other pedestrians, who avoided the car. In the end, the car turns and crashes into a shop window, crushing a woman against it. She lost both of her legs in the impact.

Following the impact, a bystander opened the car door. The driver exited the vehicle, shoved the bystander, and fled down Corso Adriano. Pursued by several people present, the man attempted to hide but was reached by a pedestrian, Luca Signorelli. During the ensuing scuffle, the attacker threw Signorelli to the ground and injured him non-lethally with a knife to the head and chest. The assailant was subsequently restrained by other bystanders and ultimately arrested by law enforcement.

=== Immediate aftermath ===
The testimonies of the citizens who witnessed the incident stated that they found themselves in a scene like in 2016 Nice truck attack. The accident sparked panic and shock among witnesses.

== Victims ==
Eight people were injured, four critically. They were identified as five women and three men. Victims were taken to hospitals in Modena and Bologna, with those critically injured being evacuated by helicopter.

One victim had both of her legs severed by the collision, while another had to have her legs amputated. Those two victims were identified as female tourists from Poland and Germany, aged 69 and 53.

A critically injured victim, a 55-year-old Italian woman, died of her wounds at hospital on July 22, 2026.

== Perpetrator ==
The driver was a 31-year-old Italian citizen of Moroccan origin, Salim El Koudri, who was born in Bergamo and was raised in Ravarino. El Koudri was unemployed and had been suffering from schizoid personality disorder since 2022.

The perpetrator was subdued by pedestrians after he stabbed a man. He was then arrested.

== Investigation ==
Police detained the perpetrator after the attack. Authorities were investigating whether the driver had been under the influence of drugs, and whether the act was deliberate. During the evening, at a press conference, the Prefect of Modena Fabrizia Triolo denied that the perpetrator was under the influence of psychotropic substances and that he had committed a deliberate act, adding that in 2022 the perpetrator had shown signs of serious schizoid mental disorders.

Prosecutor of Republic Luca Masini declared that "there is a clear and evident intent to endanger public safety, not just the lives of the individual victims, in a central city street and in a seamless space and time". A day after the attack, Minister of the Interior Matteo Piantedosi said that terrorism was ruled out and that the attack happened due to the perpetrator's psychiatric disorders. GIP Donatella Pianezzi stated that there was no evidence the attacker had acted as a result of schizoid personality disorder, for which he had been receiving treatment at a local clinic, nor any evidence that he had acted without intent or volition.

Police also conducted a house search at El Koudri's home in Ravarino, in the province of Modena.

== Reactions ==
President of the Italian Republic Sergio Mattarella expressed his concern to the mayor of Modena over the accident and the serious injuries, and asked him to thank those who "courageously stopped the perpetrator" of the serious incident. Prime Minister of Italy Giorgia Meloni, who was attending the Europe Gulf Forum in Navarino, Greece, expressed deep concern about the incident while in contact with Minister of the Interior Matteo Piantedosi and expressed her closeness to the mayor of Modena, who also condemned the perpetrator. Italy's right wing deputy prime minister Matteo Salvini, who leads the League party, named the preparator on X and described him as, "second-generation criminal".

On 17 May, President Mattarella and Prime Minister Meloni went to Baggiovara Hospital in Modena and Maggiore Hospital in Bologna to visit the injured.

== See also ==
- 2016 Nice truck attack
- List of vehicle-ramming attacks
