= 2020 Trier attack =

Vehicle ramming incident in 2020 in Germany

2020 Trier car attack
- 2020 Trier attack (Germany)
- Location: Trier, Rhineland-Palatinate, Germany
- Date: 1 December 2020; 13:45
- Target: Civilians
- Attack type: Vehicle-ramming attack
- Weapon: Land Rover SUV
- Deaths: 6 (including one victim who died in 2021)
- Injuries: 23
- Motive: Inconclusive

At 13:45 on 1 December 2020, a man rammed pedestrians with an SUV at high speed in a pedestrian zone in Trier, Rhineland-Palatinate, Germany, killing six people: a 45-year-old man and his infant daughter, a 77-year-old man and three women aged 25, 52, and 73, and wounding 23 others. The driver, who was alone in the car and had a blood alcohol content of 0.14%, was arrested at the scene.

The driver was identified as a 51-year-old local homeless man of German nationality. He was born in Trier and at the time of the attack lived in the car. Police do not think that he acted for political, religious or ideological motives, but for mental health problems mixed with the alcohol abuse. Investigators said that he wanted to kill and injure as many people as possible.

== Trial ==
The main hearing began on August 19, 2021, and ended on August 16, 2022, with a sentence of life imprisonment for murder in four cases, fourteen counts of attempted murder, each in conjunction with intentional dangerous interference with road traffic. In addition the defendant was ordered to be placed in a psychiatric hospital.

Because the Federal Court of Justice had partially overturned the Trier Regional Court's first judgment from August 2022, the new trial focused primarily on the defendant's condition in the period immediately before and after the rampage. According to a psychiatric expert, the defendant has paranoid schizophrenia. However, he did not commit the rampage in a delusion, but consciously. According to witness statements, he had planned the killing spree and had taken care of the last things immediately beforehand.

In 2024 the Landgericht Trier confirmed the verdict but his lawyer tried to appeal the decision, which ultimately failed, making the verdict final.

== See also ==
- Graz car attack
- January 2017 Melbourne car attack
- December 2017 Melbourne car attack
- 2017 Times Square car attack
- Volkmarsen ramming attack
