= 2023 Guangzhou car attack =

Mass murder in Guangdong, China

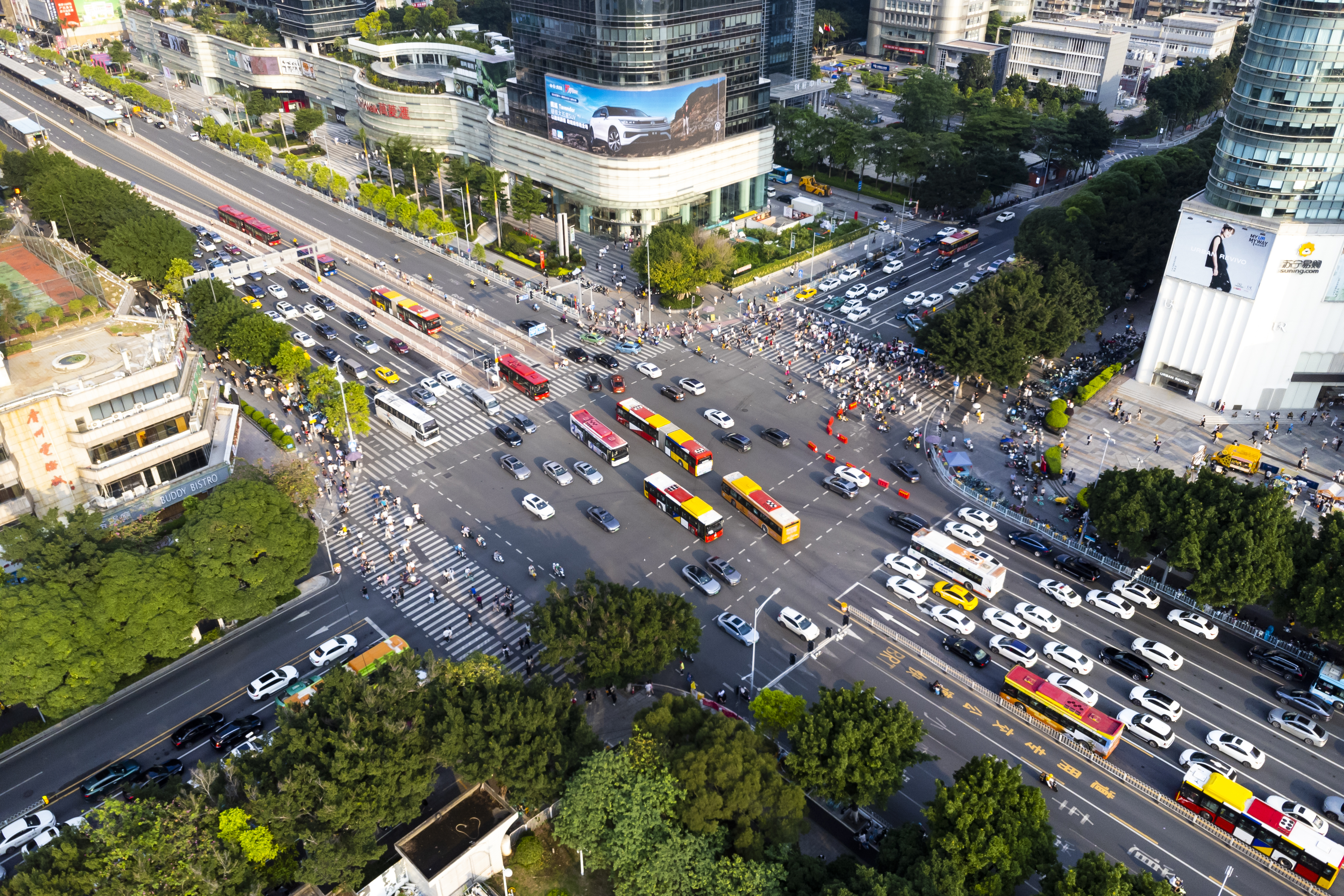
- Intersection where the first and third collisions occurred
- Native name: 广州天河“1·11”驾车撞人案
- Location: 23.13177411172892°N 113.33130376906436°E; Tianhe Road, Guangzhou, China
- Date: 11 January 2023; 17:25 (UTC+8)
- Target: Pedestrians and motorists
- Attack type: Vehicle-ramming attack
- Weapon: Black BMW X3
- Deaths: 6
- Injuries: 29
- Perpetrator: Wen Qingyun
- Verdict: Death
- Convictions: Murder (6 counts); Endangering public safety

On 11 January 2023, the driver of a black BMW X3 deliberately rammed his vehicle into a crowd of pedestrians and motorists on Tianhe Road in Guangzhou, Guangdong, China. The incident resulted in the deaths of six people and injuries to 29 others. The perpetrator, identified as 22-year-old Wen Qingyun, was arrested, sentenced to death, and subsequently executed in April 2024 in connection with the attack.

== Background ==
The site of the attack, which occurred during evening rush hour, is one of the busiest, densely packed commercial districts in Guangzhou. The intersection at Tianhe and Tiyu East Road, where most of the casualties occurred, is known as "the busiest intersection in Guangzhou." The crosswalk connects two shopping plazas together.

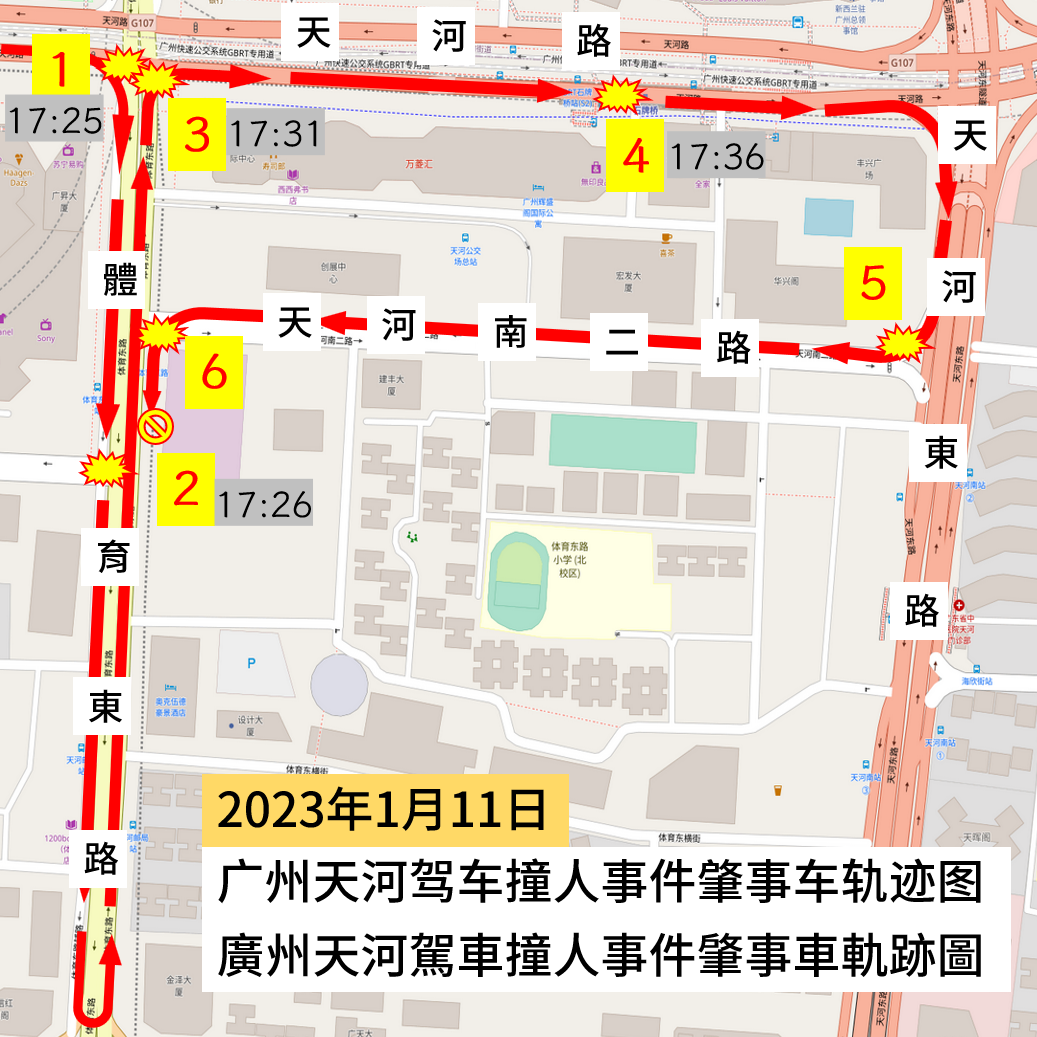
Route of the car during the attack

== Attack ==
At approximately 17:25 on 11 January 2023, the driver turned south from Tianhe Road to Tiyu East Road, running over several pedestrians who were passing through the intersection. After driving to Tiyu East Road, he struck a pedestrian at the intersection of Tianhe South Road. He then returned to the first attack site and drove into more pedestrians. Driving east to Tianhe Road, he hit two delivery drivers and a bicycle rider near the Shipaiqiao Bus Station. He then turned into the intersection at Tianhe East Road and Tianhe South 2nd Road, where he struck more pedestrians. The driver proceeded to ram into a traffic policeman riding on a motorcycle, who survived. The car finally stopped after crashing into a guard rail that separated the motor lane from the bike lane.

Wen proceeded to exit the vehicle and throw Renminbi banknotes on the ground. He also attempted to flee the scene, but was subdued by witnesses in the area. As he was being arrested, he claimed that his uncle was Huang Kunming, the Communist Party secretary of Guangdong and a member of the Politburo of the Chinese Communist Party.

Six people died in the attack, the youngest being a six-year-old girl, and 29 others were injured. The wounded victims were taken to and treated at local hospitals.

=== Collision timeline ===
#	Collision site	Description
1	Intersection at Tianhe Road and Tiyu East Road	Multiple pedestrians were struck
2	Intersection at Tiyu East Road and Tianhe South 1st Road	A woman crossing the sidewalk was hit
3	Intersection at Tianhe Road and Tiyu East Road	Several pedestrians were knocked down
4	Near Shipaiqiao Bus Station on the south side of Tianhe Road	Three people were struck; two delivery drivers, and a pedestrian riding a bicycle
5	Intersection at Tianhe South 2nd Road and Tianhe East Road	More pedestrians, including a woman on the sidewalk, were hit
6	South side of the intersection at Tianhe South 2nd Road and Tiyu East Road	A traffic policeman was struck

== Perpetrator ==
At 19:36 on the night of the attack, Guangzhou police announced they arrested a suspect, Wen Qingyun (Chinese: 温庆运; April 2000 – 19 April 2024), a 22-year-old man from Jieyang. Three days later, he was charged with endangering public safety by dangerous means. Red Star News contacted Wen's father, who stated that at about 12:00, his son said he was going out to find friends, and then drove away.

Wen had no criminal record prior to the attack. After graduating from junior college in 2021, he stayed in school to work for half a year, and then returned to Qishi in Dongguan to run a stationery store with his parents. Wen did not have a fixed salary, and if he needed money, he asked his mother directly. During his first trial, Wen admitted that he presented himself as a "rich second generation" on social platforms to attract women, but was exposed by a blogger in February 2022.

On the day of the incident, Wen's parents scolded him for irresponsibly spending money by purchasing two packs of cigarettes. He then went for a drive in his father's BMW X3. The public prosecution agency said that Wen's speed reached 180 km/h on the highway at one point, and that he also punched his card four times on the Huanan Expressway to evade tolls. He also smashed the windshield. According to Wen's confession, when he was driving to the intersection, he suddenly developed an urge to take his emotions out on others, so he directly accelerated and drove into the crowd.

=== Legal proceedings ===
On April 18, 2023, Wen's trial was held in the Guangzhou Intermediate People's Court. At the trial, Wen's attorney requested a psychiatric evaluation for Wen, but Wen's family members claimed that the family had no history of mental illness, and Wen had never gone to the hospital for a mental examination. The court ultimately rejected the request. They then sentenced Wen to death and deprivation of political rights for life. Wen appealed against the verdict after his trial ended. However, on 28 June 2023, Wen's appeal was dismissed by the Guangdong High People's Court, which stated that Wen's criminal conduct was "extremely cruel with extremely serious consequences, subjective malignancy and great social harm."

A family member of one of the victims, who was present at the trial, said Wen had a quiet demeanor. He said Wen expressed remorse, but did not say what he was remorseful for, nor did he apologize to the victims' families.

Wen was executed on 19 April 2024.

== Reactions ==
After the attack, citizens went to a station near the scene to lay flowers in mourning.

Guangzhou police were criticized by the public for referring to the attack as a traffic accident. Some accused them of attempting to downplay the severity of the attack. The incident became a top trending topic on Weibo and other Chinese social media platforms. However, posts and comments relating to the attack were removed 24 hours later, leading to censorship allegations against Weibo.

== See also ==
- 2024 Zhuhai car attack
- 2024 Changde car attack
- List of rampage killers (vehicular homicide)
