= 2019 Zaoyang car attack =

Vehicle ramming attack in Zaoyang, China

Zaoyang car attack
- Zaoyang (China)
- Location: Zaoyang, Hubei Province, China
- Date: 22 March 2019; 7 years ago 6:00 a.m.
- Target: Pedestrians
- Attack type: Vehicle-ramming attack, mass murder
- Deaths: 7 (including the attacker)
- Injuries: 8

On 22 March 2019, a man deliberately drove his car into pedestrians in Zaoyang, Hubei, China, killing six people. Police shot him dead. The driver was later identified as 44-year-old Cui Lidong who was known to police as a previous offender. He is said to have carried daggers in his car at the time, and had wounded his wife and daughter at home shortly before the attack.
