= 2001 Azor attack =

Terrorist attack near Azor, Israel

- Part of The Second Intifada
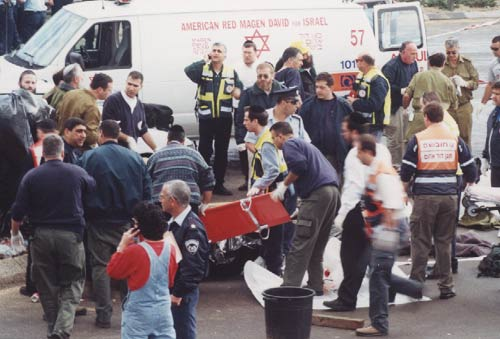
- The attack aftermath

- The attack site
- Location: 32°01′16″N 34°48′21″E; Azor junction, Israel
- Date: 14 February 2001
- Attack type: Vehicle-ramming attack
- Deaths: 8 (7 soldiers, 1 civilian)
- Injuries: 26
- Perpetrator: Hamas claimed responsibility
- Assailant: Khalil Abu-Alba

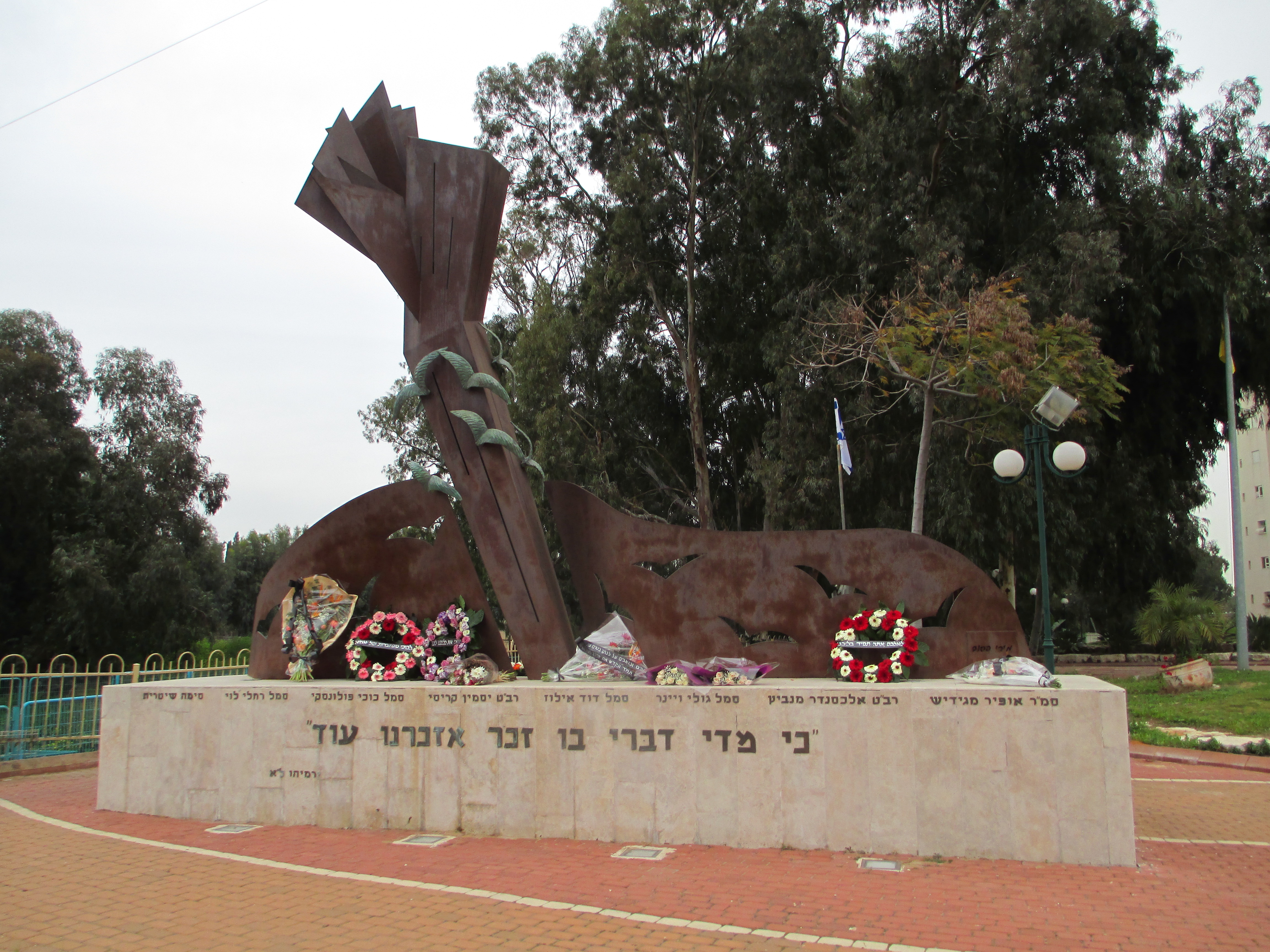
Memorial at the place of the attack

On 14 February 2001, a vehicular attack took place near Azor, Israel. A Palestinian man from Gaza drove a bus into a group of Israeli soldiers who stood at a bus stop at Azor junction, killing eight people—seven soldiers and one civilian, and injuring 26 further. The Islamist militant organization Hamas claimed responsibility for the attack.

== Attack ==
The attacker, 35-year old Khalil Abu Alba from Gaza, was a bus driver who used to drive Arab workers in the morning from his city toward Tel Aviv. He had been an Egged bus driver for five years before the attack.

On 14 February, after dropping off as usual the Arab workers at Lod and Ramle, he drove toward Holon. When arriving Azor junction, he noticed a group of Israeli soldiers waiting at a bus stop. The attacker accelerated the bus, and sharply swerved to the right, hitting dozens of people. He killed eight people, seven soldiers and one civilian, and injured 26.

After the attack he drove the bus quickly southwards towards Gaza. The bus was stopped only after crashing into a truck 30km away after police officers had shot at its wheels.

== Victims ==
Among the victims who were killed were:

- Simcha Shitrit, 30, of Rishon Lezion, Israel
- Sergeant Julie (Sarah) Weiner, aged 21, from Jerusalem, Israel, originally from France
- Sergeant Ofir Magidish, 20, of Kiryat Malachi, Israel
- Corporal Alexander Manevitz, 18, of Ashkelon, Israel
- Sergeant David Iloz, 21, of Kiryat Malachi, Israel
- Corporal Yasmin Karisi, 18, of Ashkelon, Israel
- Sergeant Kochava Polonsky, 19, of Ashkelon, Israel
- Sergeant Racheli Levy, 19, of Ashkelon, Israel

21 people were injured in the attack.

== Memorial ==
A memorial plaque in the place of the attack reads: "This monument commemorates those who perished in the stampede attack, in which 8 people were run over to death and 21 were injured. The attack happened at the Tempo intersection near Azor.

"For as often as I speak of him, I do earnestly remember him still"

The monument was created by Israeli sculptor Miri Passov.
