= 2024 Zhuhai car attack =

Vehicle ramming attack in China

- A view shows the car moments before it rammed into a group of people on the road outside the Zhuhai Stadium
- Location: 22.2758°N 113.5281°E; Zhuhai, Guangdong, China
- Date: 11 November 2024; 19:48 CST (UTC+08:00)
- Attack type: Vehicle-ramming attack, mass murder, suicide attempt
- Weapon: Beijing BJ40
- Deaths: 38
- Injuries: 48+
- Perpetrator: Fan Weiqiu
- Motive: Marriage breakdown, life disappointment, and dissatisfaction with the division of marital property from his divorce
- Convictions: Endangering public safety by dangerous means

On 11 November 2024, 62-year-old Fan Weiqiu drove his SUV into people on the exercise track at the Zhuhai Stadium sports center in Zhuhai, Guangdong, China, killing 38 and injuring 48 more. Weiqiu then attempted to kill himself with a knife; he was taken into custody and sent to a hospital. Weiqiu was believed to have been motivated by anger over a recent divorce settlement. He was sentenced to death in December 2024, and executed on 20 January 2025.

Videos and coverage of the attack were censored online. Details about it were not released until the following day, a delay that drew heavy criticism on Chinese social media platforms. It is the deadliest attack in China since the May 2014 Ürümqi attack.

== Attack ==
A map of the sports center; the path the driver took through the walking track is marked in red

There was heightened security in Zhuhai, which was to host a major civil and military airshow the next day, the China International Aviation & Aerospace Exhibition (Zhuhai Airshow).

At about 19:48 (GMT+8) on 11 November 2024, the attacker drove an SUV at 70–80 km/h (43–50 mph) into people while around 300 of them were exercising at the Zhuhai Sports Center running track. An eyewitness said that the driver drove in a loop on the running track, striking many people.

Some victims were wearing sports uniforms of a local exercise group. According to a witness, most of the victims were middle-aged or elderly people in exercise groups. There were typically six or seven groups walking at the sports complex every day, accompanied by music. The loud music may have muffled the initial sounds of the attack, leaving people little time to react.

The architect who designed the fitness center told Lianhe Zaobao that vehicles are not allowed on the track, which has stone bollards and fences set up all around it. He suspected that the perpetrator drove into the area from the other side of the stadium.

On 12 November, Zhuhai Police said that the attack resulted in 35 deaths and 43 injuries. In December, it was updated to 38 deaths and 48 injuries. On 13 November, the Ministry of Foreign Affairs of China said that no foreign nationals were among the victims.

== Perpetrator ==
According to a police statement, the suspect was a 62-year-old divorced man named Fan Weiqiu (樊维秋). He was arrested while trying to flee the scene. He was found unconscious with wounds to his neck consistent with self-harm in his car and was taken to the hospital for treatment. Police said that Fan entered a coma after he cut himself in the neck and chest with a knife. Early reports claimed that the attack stemmed from discontent over the financial settlement of his divorce. Journalists have noted China's economic downturn may be a contributing factor, suggesting relations between the trend of random attacks and the economic downturns and rising social pressures of the country. (Note: Attributed to multiple sources:)

The vehicle used in the attack was a Beijing BJ40 bought from a local dealership. The BJ40 is a large off-road vehicle weighing about 2 tonnes and worth around CNY¥ 200,000 (US$31,000). Fan purchased the car with a loan a week before the attack and picked it up on 10 November, the day before the attack.

On 27 December 2024, Fan Weiqiu was sentenced to death by the Zhuhai Intermediate People's Court. The court publicly tried the case of the defendant for endangering public safety through dangerous methods and delivered a verdict on the same day. On 20 January 2025, Fan was executed.

== Aftermath ==
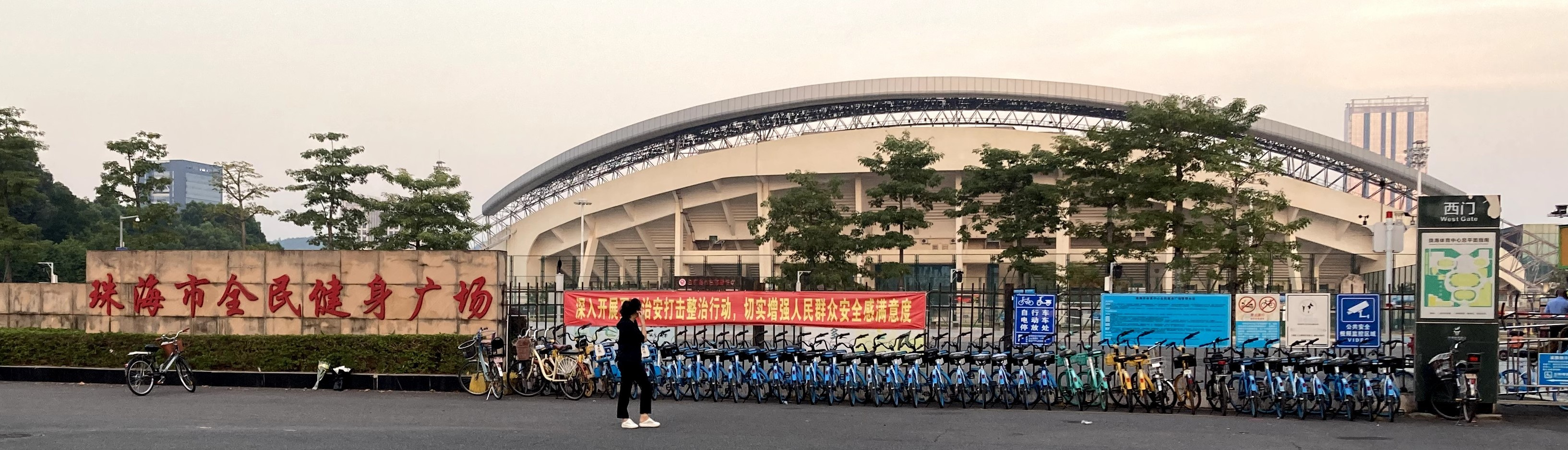
West gate of the stadium on the day after the attack

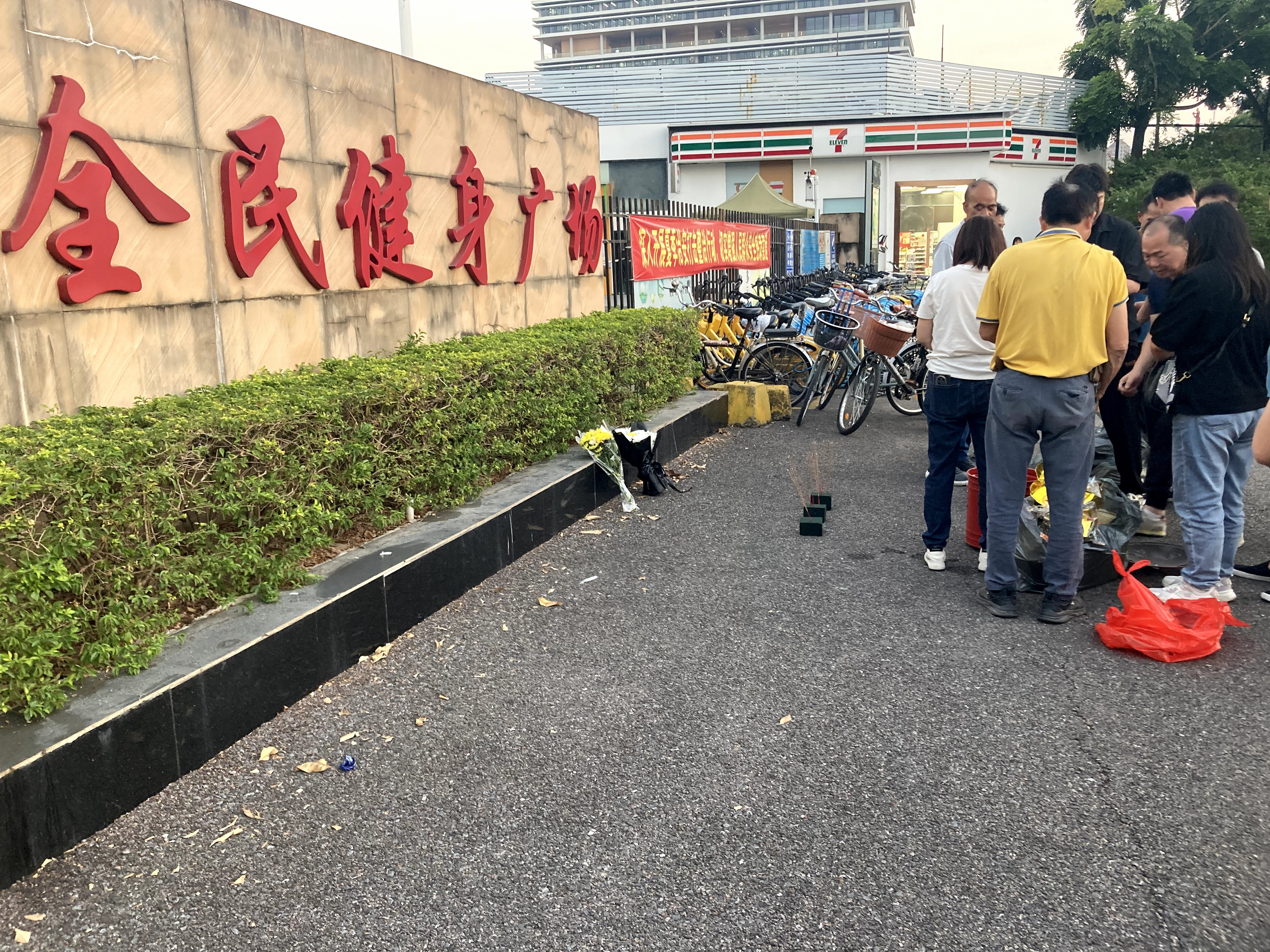
Mourners at the west gate of Zhuhai Sports Center the day after the attack

Shortly after the attack, many local residents went to hospitals and blood banks to donate blood, forming long queues overnight.

A makeshift memorial was created at the location of the attack, but Chinese authorities quickly began removing wreaths, candles, and alcohol placed there, while cordoning off access to a makeshift vigil area. The police at the location told visitors that there were "hostile foreign forces with malicious intentions," according to the South China Morning Post.

Local officials, including the Chinese Communist Party (CCP) Committee Secretary and mayor, arrived at the scene to oversee the rescue operations and establish a task force to expedite medical treatment for the injured, investigate the attack, and support the victims' families. The Zhuhai Sports Center issued a notice at around 9 p.m. on 11 November, announcing the immediate suspension of operations. General Secretary of the CCP, Xi Jinping, along with Premier Li Qiang, issued directives on the evening of 12 November, calling for all efforts to treat the injured, severe punishment of the perpetrator according to the law, and measures to mitigate societal risks. Huang Kunming, CCP Politburo member and CCP Secretary of Guangdong, held a series of video conferences following the attack, including a special session of the Guangdong Provincial Committee for Building a Safe Guangdong.

On 12 November, Japan's embassy in China warned its nationals about personal security issues in China, advising Japanese people not to speak Japanese loudly in public. Chief Cabinet Secretary Yoshimasa Hayashi expressed condolences and sympathy for the victims and families, and stated that no Japanese citizens were among the victims.

=== Censorship by Chinese authorities ===
Searches for the attack and what happened were originally censored. During the first hours after the attack, Chinese media outlets were told not to report on the issue. Articles and posts, including images and videos of the events on the day of the attack, were censored during the first 24 hours after the attack. Since the attack happened only one day before the opening of the Zhuhai Airshow, these actions caused more tensions on Chinese social media platforms, with people being angered by the delay of details regarding the attack. A hashtag mentioning the death toll was censored on Weibo, a Chinese microblogging site.

On the morning of 12 November, Weibo only had vague posts indicating that something had happened in Zhuhai. Meanwhile, videos spread over X outside mainland China. Teacher Li Is Not Your Teacher posted a video on X of several people lying on the ground and a woman yelling in pain while a firefighter rendered aid to a victim.

On 12 November, BBC News journalists, including Stephen McDonell, were interrupted and pushed during their live coverage by suspected CCP officials masquerading as locals to prevent coverage. A TBS Television reporter tweeted that he was surrounded by people when reporting before being brought to the police, who asked him to delete all his material. Local officials stayed outside the intensive care units where injured victims were taken after the attack and prevented journalists from speaking with family members.

Rose Luqiu, a researcher on Chinese censorship from Hong Kong Baptist University, said that the information control on incidents with high death tolls is normal for China. She believed that the reason was to reduce panic and the likelihood of copycat crimes.

== See also ==
- 2023 Guangzhou car attack
- 2024 Changde car attack
- List of vehicle-ramming attacks
