= Murder of Yadira Arroyo =

2017 murder in the Bronx, New York, United States

- Location of murder (New York City)
- Location: 40.8285°N 73.8607°W; The Bronx, New York, United States
- Date: March 16, 2017; 9 years ago
- Attack type: Homicide by vehicle-ramming attack
- Weapon: FDNY Ambulance #582 (Ford F450)
- Deaths: 1 (Yadira Arroyo)
- Injuries: 1
- Perpetrator: Jose Gonzalez
- Charges: Two counts of first-degree murder, two counts of second-degree murder, first-degree manslaughter and first-degree robbery
- Verdict: Sentenced to life imprisonment without the chance of parole

On March 16, 2017, New York City Fire Department emergency medical technician (EMT) Yadira Arroyo was murdered in the Bronx, New York, United States. 25-year-old Jose Gonzalez ran over Arroyo with her own ambulance, killing her and injuring her partner. Gonzalez, a mentally ill recidivist, was arrested at the scene and charged with the attack.

Gonzalez was found mentally unfit to stand trial on several occasions. However, he was eventually determined to be sane and underwent trial. He was found guilty of Arroyo's murder in March 2023 and sentenced to life imprisonment the following month.

== People involved ==
=== Yadira Arroyo ===
The victim was 44-year-old Yadira Arroyo, an EMT for the New York City Fire Department. A mother of five, she had served in the Bronx for 14 years, being assigned to EMS Station 26. Arroyo was the eighth New York City emergency medical worker to be killed while serving since 1994.

=== Jose Gonzalez ===
The perpetrator was identified as 25-year-old Jose Gonzalez (born May 2, 1991), a local resident of the Bronx with a long criminal history. He had received psychiatric treatment for mental illnesses like schizophrenia and depression. He lived at a homeless shelter at the time of the murder and had not taken his medication in several months. Gonzalez's uncle said that Gonzalez had started acting oddly "after a bad car accident two or three years" prior to the murder. Gonzalez was hospitalized around ten to fifteen times for his mental illnesses, including one time in February 2017, one month prior to the attack. Three weeks prior to the attack, he was charged with criminal mischief and attempted assault after allegedly attacking a police officer and damaging a police vehicle. In that incident, he allegedly spat in a female officer's face and told her she should be raped. He was ordered to be released by a judge even though prosecutors requested to have him held on bond. Police said that he had 31 prior arrests in total, including several for possessing or selling marijuana.

== Murder ==
In the morning of March 16, 2017, Jose Gonzalez attacked a teenager and stole the victim's backpack. He then jumped on an ambulance operated by Yadira Arroyo and her partner as they responded to an emergency call in Soundview. Gonzalez rode the ambulance for several blocks before passersby flagged down Arroyo to indicate Gonzalez's presence. The ambulance stopped at the intersection of White Plains Road and Watson Avenue in the Morris Park neighborhood. When Arroyo and her partner exited the vehicle to help Gonzalez, he entered through the ambulance's open side door and reversed the ambulance, ramming into both EMTs. While the other EMT was slightly injured, Arroyo was knocked down and dragged underneath the vehicle. The ambulance struck five other vehicles and a pile of snow before stopping. The incident was recorded by a bystander. Gonzalez attempted to escape the area, but was subdued by an off-duty officer of the Metropolitan Transportation Authority Police Department and several civilians before being arrested by responding police. Toxicology reports stated that Gonzalez tested positive for PCP and marijuana.

Arroyo was taken to Jacobi Medical Center in critical condition, where she died from her injuries. The other EMT sustained minor injuries and was taken to the hospital in stable condition.

== Aftermath ==
=== Legal proceedings ===
On March 17, the day after Arroyo's murder, Gonzalez was formally arraigned on charges of two counts of first-degree murder, two counts of second-degree murder, first-degree manslaughter, and first-degree robbery. On April 6, he pleaded not guilty to the charges. Dozens of emergency personnel arrived at the courthouse where Gonzalez was arraigned to support Arroyo's family.

On two separate occasions in 2018, Gonzalez was found mentally unfit to stand trial. At the time, he was undergoing psychiatric treatment at Rikers Island. According to the district attorney's office, he was found mentally unfit to stand trial again in May 2022, but was later found mentally fit and stood trial for Arroyo's murder. On March 8, 2023, he was found guilty on first-degree murder charges. A month later, on April 26, Gonzalez was sentenced to life imprisonment without the possibility of parole. He is currently imprisoned at the Attica Correctional Facility.

=== Honors ===
In a press conference on March 17, then-Mayor of New York City Bill de Blasio and then-New York City Fire Commissioner Daniel Nigro commemorated Arroyo.

On April 17, the off-duty MTA police officer who stopped Gonzalez was honored by Arroyo's co-workers at her EMS Station, Station 26.
