= 2024 Texas Department of Public Safety building truck attack =

Crash in Brenham, Texas

- Location: Highway Patrol Department; 975 US Highway 290; Brenham, Texas, US
- Date: April 12, 2024
- Attack type: Vehicle-ramming attack
- Weapon: Semi-trailer truck
- Deaths: 2
- Injuries: 12
- Motive: Denial of commercial driver's license (suspected)
- Accused: Clenard Parker

On April 12, 2024, a man crashed a stolen semi-trailer truck into a Texas Department of Public Safety (DPS) office in Brenham, Texas, United States, killing two people and injuring twelve others. The suspect was arrested at the scene and identified as 42-year-old Clenard Parker.

== Attack ==
On the morning of April 12, 2024, Parker allegedly stole a semi-trailer truck from a gas station in Chappell Hill and drove to Brenham, where he was pursued by deputies from the Washington County Sheriff's Office. At around 10:41 a.m., Parker allegedly took a sharp right turn into a DPS office and rammed the truck through its front entrance, resulting in one man's death and the injuring of thirteen others. The truck then reversed from the crash site and appeared to be preparing to strike it again, however authorities at the scene were able to detain the driver. Brenham Mayor Atwood Kenjura commented that, according to the fire chief, "if he had veered a little bit to the left the second time, there would have been a collapse of that building." A second person died of her injuries later that month.

== Victims ==
The first deceased victim was identified as 78-year-old Bobby Huff of Giddings, who was triaged via helicopter to St. Joseph Health Regional Hospital in Bryan where he was pronounced dead later the same day. Huff was not an employee of DPS and was at the office for a license renewal. Eight days after the attack, 63-year-old Cheryl Turner of Brenham died from her injuries. Turner's mother-in-law also had to have a leg amputated as a result of the attack.

== Suspect ==
The suspect was identified as 42-year-old Clenard Parker (born July 1981), from Chappell Hill, Texas. Investigators discovered that Parker had visited the office the day before the attack, where he attempted to get his commercial driver's license renewed, but was denied. According to a relative, Parker used to drive semi-trailer trucks. The relative further stated that Parker suffered delusions following a "traumatizing" car accident several years prior to the attack, recalling an incident where Parker believed former U.S. President Donald Trump had once visited his home, when Trump had, in fact, not. Another relative said Parker was living alone in a trailer at the time of the attack, and also stated that Parker suffered from mental illness. Parker has a criminal history of non-violent offenses dating back to 1999, including criminal trespass, arson and a felony prohibited weapons charge.
