= Acahay Massacre =

Massacres in Paraguay

- Location: Acahay, Paraguarí Department, Paraguay
- Date: January 31, 1993
- Attack type: Vehicle-ramming attack
- Weapon: Mitsubishi Pajero
- Deaths: 7
- Injuries: 10 (including the perpetrator)
- Perpetrator: José Vidal Céspedes Estigarribia

On January 31, 1993, a mass murder occurred in the city of Acahay, Paraguarí Department, Paraguay. José Vidal Céspedes Estigarribia, 39, later nicknamed the crazy driver, indiscriminately ran over several people with his Mitsubishi Montero SUV, killing seven and injuring nine others before being arrested.

He was initially sentenced to 25 years in prison, later reduced to 22 years. He died in 2011 in a private hospital while serving his sentence.

== Background ==
José Vidal Céspedes Estigarribia was born on June 5, 1953. He lived in the city of La Paloma del Espíritu Santo and, in the days leading up to the attack, had traveled to Acahay to visit relatives before heading to Camboriú. He was married and had two children. He was a notary and was about to complete his law degree.

According to reports, he suffered from health problems, including a pancreatic operation and poorly managed diabetes, which required him to take strong medications. On January 31, 1993, during lunch near a stream, he consumed alcoholic beverages along with pills. This would have severely altered her emotional state.

Around 4:00 p.m., in a state described as hysterical, she ordered her family to get into the truck and leave the scene.

== Massacre ==
The attack began when Céspedes ran over a man on horseback, killing the animal and seriously injuring the rider. This caused fear in his own family, so he decided to get them out of the vehicle.

Later, in the urban area of Acahay, he ran over and killed his four-year-old niece, crushing her against a wall. For approximately two hours, he drove through the city streets, attacking pedestrians. His modus operandi consisted of running over victims, reversing the vehicle, and then running them over again. In total, he ran over sixteen people: seven died and nine were injured.

Residents tried to stop him using firearms, machetes, and stones. Finally, he abandoned the truck, allegedly due to a radiator failure caused by a gunshot fired by one of the residents. He was subdued by police in an abandoned house, where he was hit in the nose with the butt of a gun before being arrested.

== Victims ==
List of victims:

=== Deceased ===
- Shirley Andrea Acuña Amarilla, 4
- Roberto Salvador Segovia, 21
- Domingo Ramón Cuevas Delgado, 25
- Sergio Domínguez, 18
- Francisco Bordón, 29, died on February 2
- Félix Bordón, 35
- Edgar Domingo Maldonado, 20

=== Injured ===
- Ruben Gonzalez, 28
- Isabel Medina
- Jose Morán
- Elvira Caballero
- María Morán
- Gregorio Torres Alcaraz, 45
- Ilda Cáceres
- Mariano Cabral
- Silvidio Delvalle

== Aftermath and Legal Proceedings ==
Between 1993 and 1994, he was incarcerated in the Tacumbú National Penitentiary. He was later transferred to the Neuropsychiatric Hospital after claiming a psychiatric disorder. In November 1995, he managed to escape.

He was recaptured in 2000 in the city of Mariano Roque Alonso, Paraguay, where he was living under the false name of David Romero. On December 27, 2001, Judge Carlos Escobar sentenced him to 25 years in prison. In 2007, his sentence was reduced to 22 years. In 2011, he was transferred to the Juan Max Boettner sanatorium, where he died due to health complications.
