= 2017 Sandy, Utah attack =

Attack in Utah, U.S.

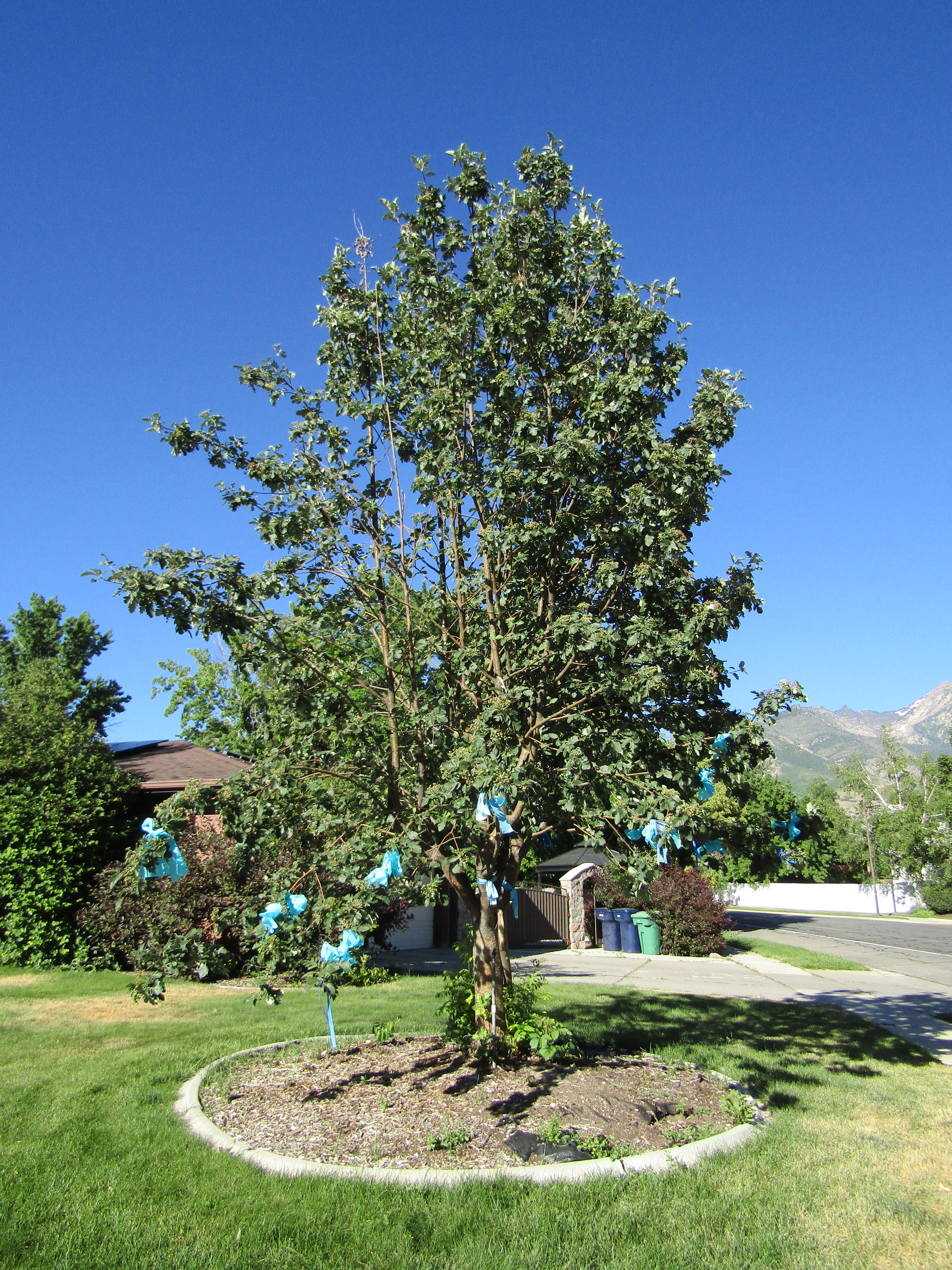
- After the attack, blue ribbons were placed on a nearby tree to honor the victims.
- Location: 40.5944°N 111.8268°W; Sandy, Utah, U.S.
- Date: June 6, 2017; 3:45 p.m.
- Target: Memorez Rackley
- Attack type: Murder–suicide and mass shooting
- Weapons: Truck; Handgun
- Deaths: 3 (including the perpetrator)
- Injuries: 2
- Perpetrator: Jeremy Patterson

The 2017 Sandy, Utah attack happened on June 6, 2017, in Sandy, Utah, when American man Jeremy Patterson rammed his truck into a vehicle and opened fire on the riders, killing two and injuring two before killing himself.

The incident originated as domestic dispute between Patterson and his ex-girlfriend Memorez Rackley, who was killed in the attack. Rackley had contacted the police before the incident concerning threats from Patterson, and she was ineligible to acquire a protective order because of the nature of their relationship. The Utah police departments involved in the case said they were reviewing their response procedures in cases of domestic violence, and the Utah State Legislature passed legislation meant to stop similar incidents from happening in Utah.

== Background ==
At the time of the attack, Jeremy Patterson was 32 years old, and Memorez Rackley was 39 years old with two sons, 11-year-old Myles and 6-year-old Jase. Rackley lived near Brookwood Elementary School and her estranged husband had moved to a different residence in Sandy. Both Patterson and Rackley were bodybuilders, and both had the same personal trainer. Rackley and Patterson entered into a relationship, which ended on June 1, 2017. The next day, Patterson threatened to kill Rackley's son Jase and posted revenge porn images of Rackley on Instagram.

On June 3, 2017, three days before the shooting, Rackley made three separate 9-1-1 calls. She told police that her ex-boyfriend was threatening her and her family. The police told Patterson to stop contacting Rackley, and advised Rackley to stay with a friend until she could get a protective order. The police did not treat the situation as a case of domestic violence because Patterson and Rackley were not married or living together. In the following days, Patterson sent private Instagram posts to Rackley with memes and messages which threatened her and accused her of keeping their relationship a secret.

On June 5, Patterson told his sister, mother, and one of his friends that he wanted to kill or hurt Rackley and her sons. Three hours before the shooting, an anonymous tipster, later identified as one of Patterson's friends, called 9-1-1 and told the dispatcher that Patterson wanted to kill his ex-girlfriend and then himself. A police officer from nearby Draper, Utah, investigated this tip, but police said it was not enough to stop the attack.

== Attack ==
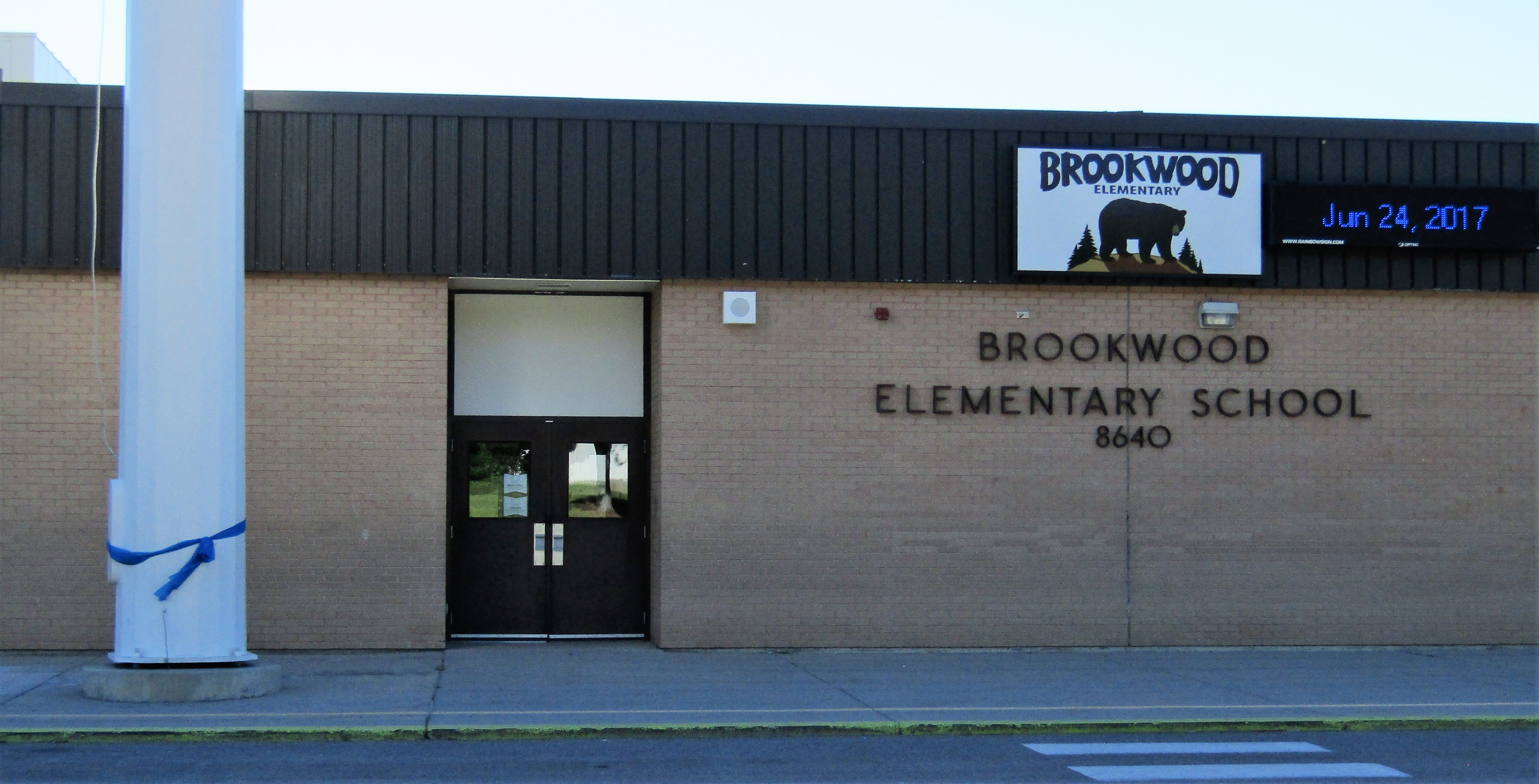
The attack started at Brookwood Elementary School in Sandy, Utah.

According to the police, Memorez Rackley and Jeremy Patterson were seen arguing near Brookwood Elementary School on June 6, 2017. A woman driving an SUV saw the argument, pulled over, and allowed Rackley and her sons to ride in the SUV with the driver's daughter. Rackley, the driver, and an observer all attempted to call 9-1-1. After they drove a couple of blocks, Patterson rammed his truck into the SUV and opened fire on the family, killing Memorez and her son Jase, before killing himself with a shot to the head. Reported injuries from the attack included the female driver's 8-year-old daughter, who was shot in the leg, and Myles Rackley, who was shot in the neck. They were both treated in stable condition, though Myles was also in critical condition. An autopsy report found Patterson's blood had "no illicit drugs or alcohol".

== Aftermath ==
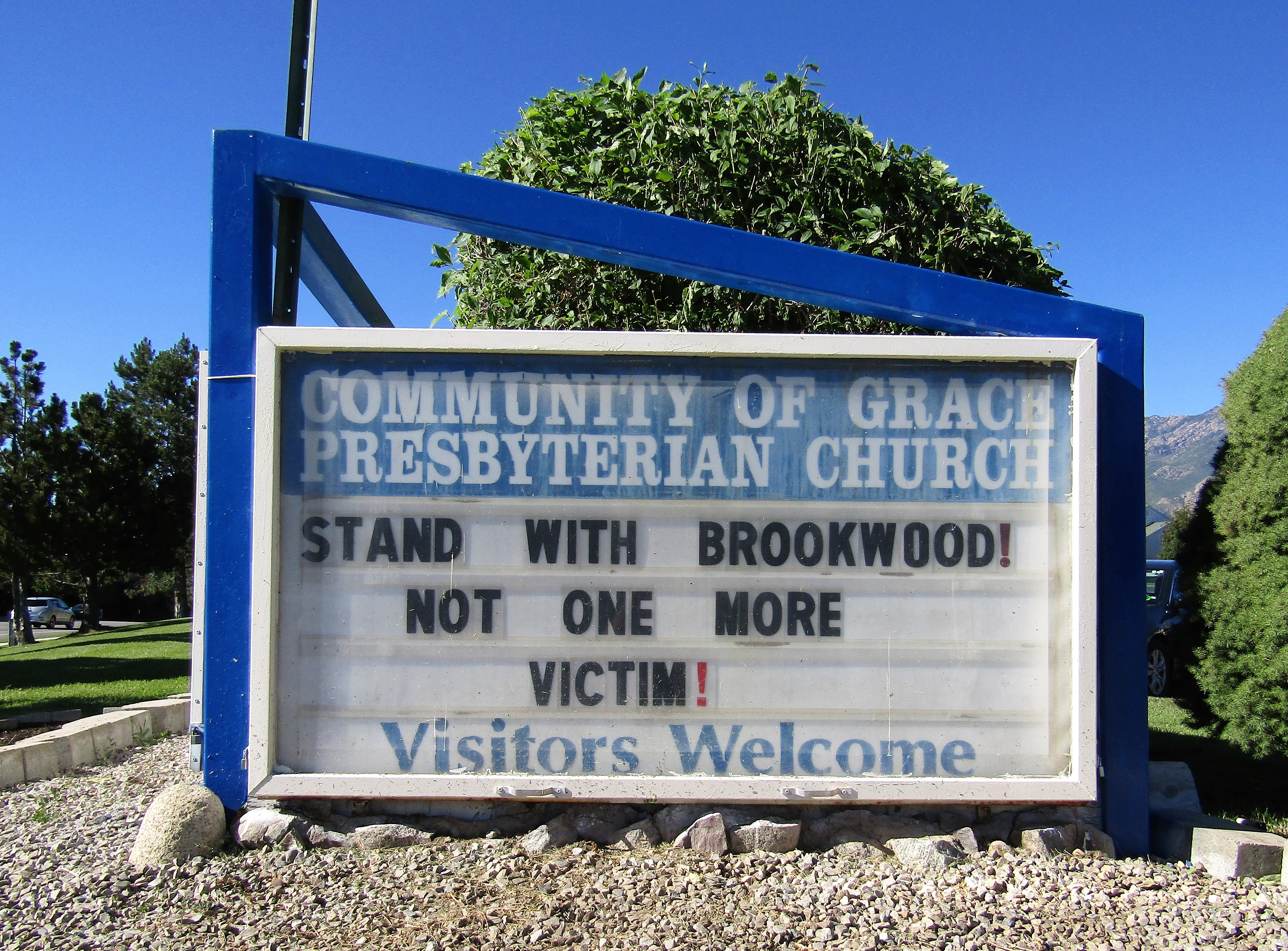
Sandy's Community of Grace Presbyterian Church expressed support for the attack's victims.

Sandy's community and religious leaders encouraged people to support those affected by the incident. A memorial fund and GoFundMe account were set up to give financial support for the Rackley family. Some of the Rackleys' friends and neighbors constructed a memorial for the family with flowers, stuffed animals, and cards. Memorez and Jase were buried at a cemetery in West Jordan on June 20, 2017.

The police in Draper and Sandy said the incident caused them to review their procedures for handling 9-1-1 calls and domestic violence cases. State officials said they were trying to get cases involving dating couples classified as domestic violence. In early January 2018, Senator Todd Weiler and Representative Angela Romero introduced legislation which would make anyone who has had a sexual relationship eligible to acquire a protective order, which could expire over time. The bill passed the Utah State Senate on January 22, 2018, with unanimous support. In early March 2018, Utah senators revised the bill to allow confiscated weapons in stalking cases to be returned. After the bill passed the Utah House of Representatives, it was signed by Utah Governor Gary Herbert on March 19, 2018, and went into effect on May 8, 2018.

== See also ==
- Domestic violence in the United States
- Dating abuse
