= 2026 Beijing ramming attack =

Vehicle-ramming attack in Beijing, China

- Location: Fangshan, Beijing, China
- Date: 29 March 2026 c.11:00 a.m. (CST)
- Target: Civilians
- Attack type: Vehicle-ramming attack
- Weapon: Front loader
- Injuries: "Many" (including the perpetrator)
- Perpetrator: Unidentified man in his 50s
- No. of participants: 1
- Defender: A group of people

On 29 March 2026, a man intentionally drove a loader into the Dahanji Market in Fangshan District, Beijing, China. Immediate casualty figures are unavailable, with social media claiming 8–13 people were killed and multiple others were injured.

== Background ==
The Dahanji Market (大韩继) is a large, long-running rural vegetable market in Beijing. It is 50 km from downtown Beijing, popular especially during weekends with the local residents.

== Incident ==
At approximately 11:00 a.m. CST, a man drove a loader into the crowded Dahanji Market. Multiple people were struck by the vehicle, including shop vendors. Video showed bystanders gathering around the loader, some throwing debris and chairs at the vehicle. The attack ended when bystanders smashed a side window of the loader's cab and dragged the driver out of the vehicle. The suspect was beaten and severely injured before being arrested by police.

The perpetrator is an unidentified man reported to be in his fifties. An image of a man, allegedly the perpetrator, visibly bloodied and subdued on the ground by locals, was shared online. Netizens assumed that he had acted out of "revenge against society", as this is a common motive in such attacks. Other online users speculated that the attack could have been related to the displacement of rural residents, based around the fact that a demolition site was nearby as part of an ongoing urbanization effort.

Chinese officials have not commented, and the site of the attack was subsequently blocked off by police. The Economist and EBC News wrote that due to internet censorship in China, only unverified information was available online through social media. Rumors estimated eight to ten dead and twelve injured. Several people were reportedly in critical condition. Social media comments, which are cited in some Taiwanese online platforms such as Mirror Media, claimed that at least 13 people died at the scene.

== See also ==
- Censorship in China
- 2004 Granby bulldozer attack
