= Zhuhai Stadium =

Sports venue in Zhuhai, China

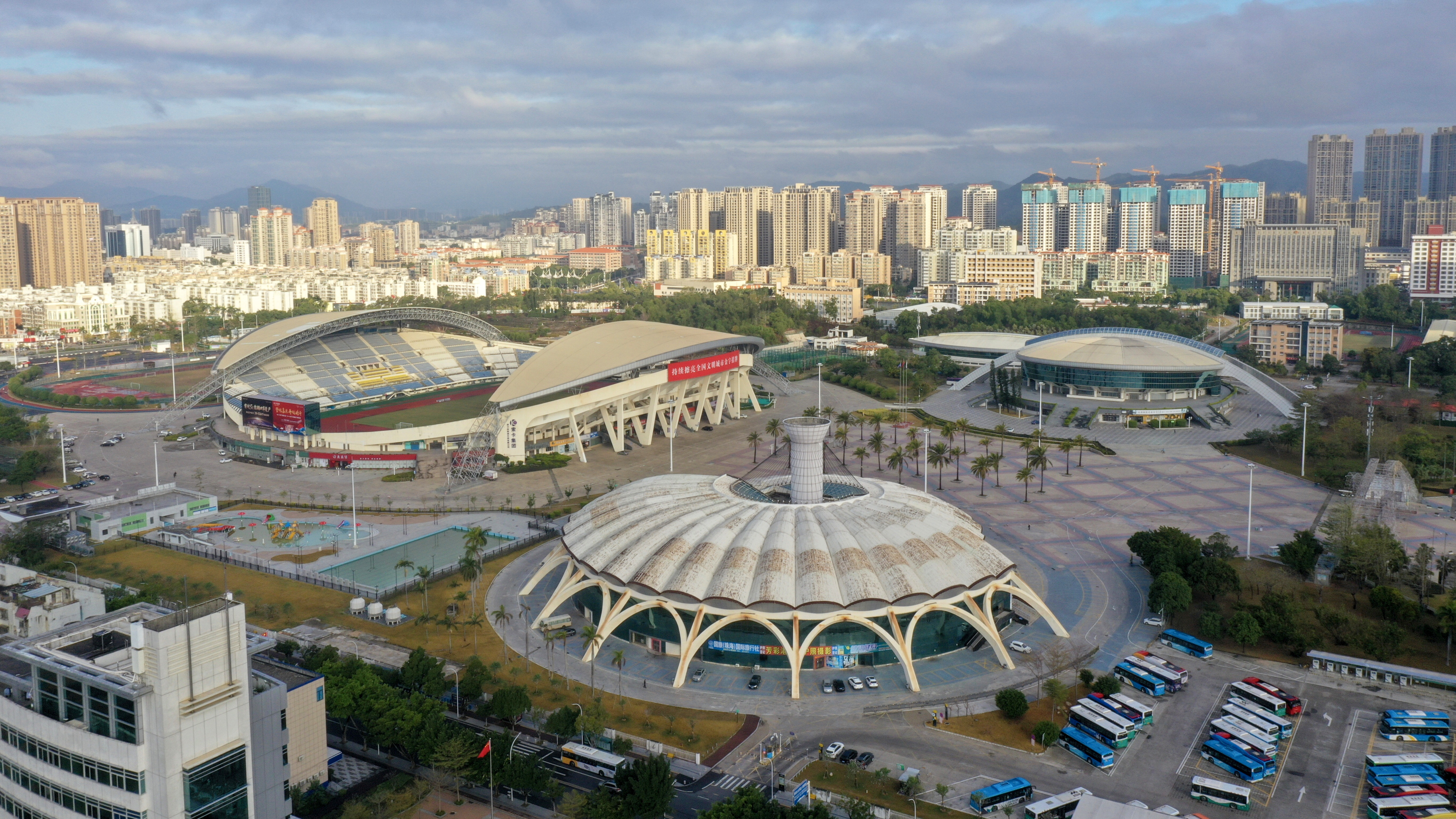
- Interactive map of Zhuhai Stadium
- Full name: Zhuhai Sports Center Stadium 珠海市体育中心体育场
- Location: Zhuhai, China
- Coordinates: 22°16′24″N 113°32′10″E
- Capacity: 35,000

Construction
- Opened: 1998

Zhuhai Stadium
- Simplified Chinese: 珠海市体育中心体育场
- Traditional Chinese: 珠海市體育中心體育場
Transcriptions
Standard Mandarin
- Hanyu Pinyin: Zhūhǎi Shì Tǐyù Zhōngxīn Tǐyùchǎng
Yue: Cantonese
- Jyutping: zyu1 hoi2 si5 tai2 juk6 zung1 sam1 tai2 juk6 coeng4

Zhuhai Stadium, formally Zhuhai Sports Center Stadium (Chinese: 珠海市体育中心体育场), is a multi-purpose stadium in Zhuhai, China. It is currently used mostly for football matches. The stadium holds 35,000 spectators. It opened in 1998. In 2024, it was the subject to a vehicle ramming attack that took the lives of 35 people and injured 44 more.

== Club Use ==
Zhuhai Qin'ao F.C. use the stadium for home games.

== International Matches ==
=== 2022 FIFA World Cup qualification ===
On 6 June 2019, Zhuhai Sports Center Stadium held a match of the 2022 FIFA World Cup qualification due to the refurbishment work at Macau's regular home, Estadio Campo Desportivo.

Date	Time	Team No. 1	Result	Team No. 2	Round	Attendance
6 June 2019	19:30	Macau	1–0	Sri Lanka	AFC First Round	901

=== Friendly ===
Date	Time	Team No. 1	Result	Team No. 2	Attendance
18 December 2010	15:00	China	3–0	Estonia	No Data

== See also ==
- Lists of stadiums
- List of football stadiums in China
- 2024 Zhuhai car attack
