= 2024 Changde car attack =

Vehicle ramming attack in China

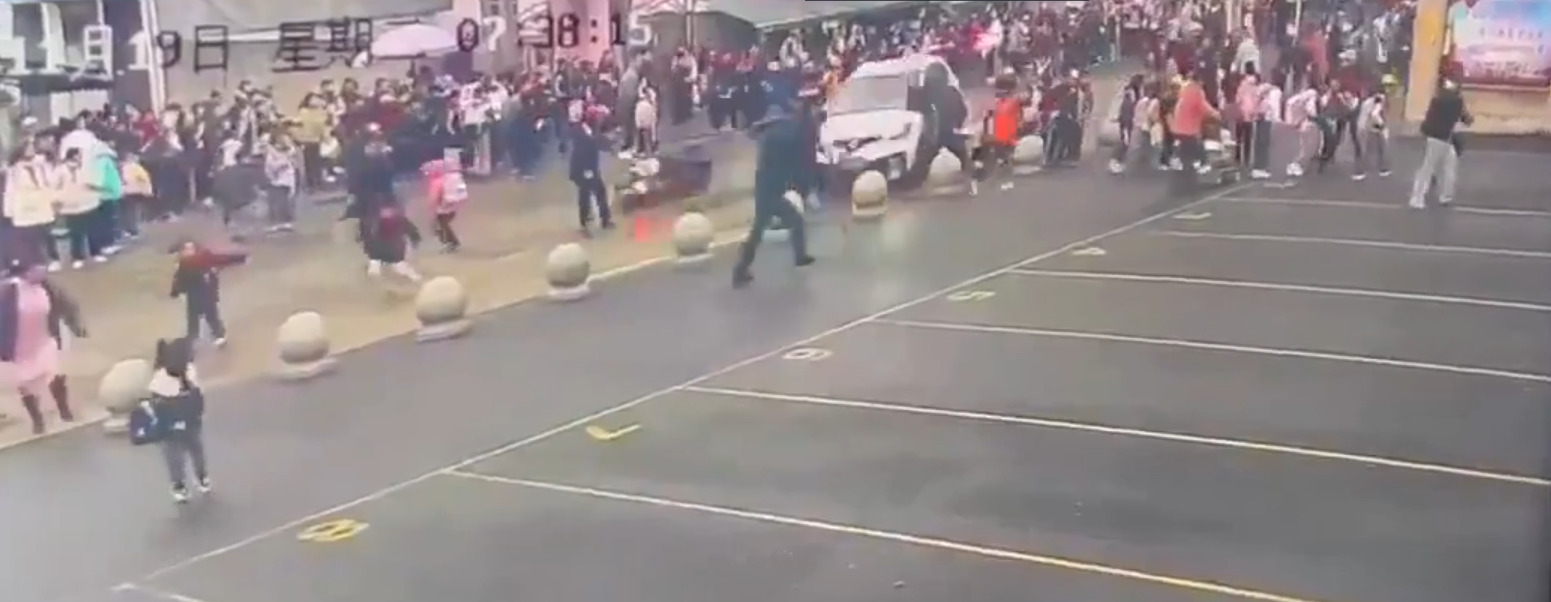
- A CCTV still of the car seconds before hitting pedestrians
- Location: Yong'an Primary School, Dingcheng, Changde, Hunan, China
- Date: 19 November 2024; 7:37 CST (UTC+08:00)
- Attack type: Vehicle-ramming attack
- Weapon: SUV
- Deaths: 0
- Injuries: 30
- Perpetrator: Huang Wen (黄文)
- Motive: Losses in investment and conflicts with family

On the morning of 19 November 2024, Huang Wen drove his SUV into people outside a primary school in Dingcheng, Changde, Hunan, China, injuring 30, including 18 students who were going to school. After the car broke down, the driver got out with a weapon and attacked the crowd around. He was arrested on the spot. The man is believed to have been motivated by losses in investment and conflicts with his family.

== Background ==
On 11 November 2024, just eight days prior the attack, the deadliest vehicle-ramming attack in the past decade in China killed 35 and injured another 43 in Zhuhai, Guangdong, causing people to worry about public safety.

== Attack ==
At 7:37 (GMT+8) on 19 November 2024, the attacker drove an SUV into people outside Yong'an Primary School while parents were sending students to school. Video clips circulating on social media showed young children running into the school's compound, shouting for help. Another clip showed the white SUV stopped beyond the school entrance. At least five people, including a student with a backpack, were lying on the path taken by the vehicle, in a narrow street in front of the school. After the SUV broke down, the attacker got out and intended to attack the crowd with a weapon, but was quickly subdued on the spot by the student's parents and school security. Police who hurried to the scene arrested the attacker.

Later on the day of the attack, Dingcheng police said that the injured were immediately sent to the hospital for treatment, and currently there was no life-threatening situation. The perpetrator had been arrested, and the incident was under further investigation.

== Reporting ==
Censors took down videos of the attack on social media shortly after the attack happened and only statements from state outlets were used to report updates.

== Sentencing ==
On 23 December 2024, Huang Wen was sentenced to death with a two-year reprieve by Changde Intermediate People's Court. Huang committed the crime to vent personal anger due to investment loss and conflicts with family, according to the court.

== See also ==
- 2023 Guangzhou car attack
- 2024 Zhuhai car attack
- List of vehicle-ramming attacks
