= 2006 San Francisco SUV attacks =

Vehicle-ramming attacks in California, United States

Omeed Aziz Popal, a native of Afghanistan, struck 18 pedestrians and killed one in the San Francisco Bay Area with his black Honda Pilot SUV on August 30, 2006, when he was 29 years old.

On July 31, 2008, at the Hall of Justice in San Francisco, state judge Carol Yaggy ruled Popal not guilty by reason of insanity of the attempted murder charges and committed him to a state psychiatric facility. According to the San Francisco Public Defender's Office, Popal was diagnosed with paranoid schizophrenia and had a history of severe mental illness. He had been involuntarily committed for mental treatment twice within the six months before the attacks. In 2013, Popal pled guilty to murder charges, was ruled criminally insane, and was committed to a state psychiatric hospital for the rest of his life.

== Victims ==
The first person to be attacked, Stephen J. Wilson, 54, was struck in Fremont, California, and died at 11:50 am. Another victim was hospitalized in critical condition. Popal struck two men at the intersection of Sutter and Steiner Streets in San Francisco. He passed through the intersection again in an attempt to hit the men a second time—and then a third time—before moving on. A witness said he saw one victim's body "thrown 25 feet."

Multiple witnesses and victims said that the driver appeared to be aiming for people, intentionally hitting them. Other victims included Vera Jenkins, 40; Pedro Aglugov, 70; Leon Stevens, 56; and Susan Rajic, 43. One police officer was slightly injured when Popal was apprehended.

== Reactions ==
California Governor Arnold Schwarzenegger called Popal's actions "malicious and hateful". He commended authorities and offered his condolences to the victims and their families. He further said that "acts of hate such as this will not be tolerated in California".

== See also ==
- Vehicle-ramming attack
