= Teacher Li Is Not Your Teacher =

Twitter account sharing human rights and social issues in China

Li Ying
- 李颖
- Twitter profile picture of Teacher Li Is Not Your Teacher
- Born: 21 May 1992 (age 34); Fuyang, Anhui, China
- Other name: Teacher Li
- Occupations: Illustrator; activist; YouTuber
- Years active: 2020–present

X information
- Handle: @whyyoutouzhele
- Display name: Teacher Li Is Not Your Teacher 李老师不是你老师
- Followers: 2.1 million

YouTube information
- Channel: 李老师不是你老师
- Subscribers: 291 thousand
- Views: 24.7 million
- Last updated: 22 October 2025

Teacher Li Is Not Your Teacher (Chinese: 李老师不是你老师; pinyin: Lǐ lǎoshī bùshì nǐ lǎoshī), also known by his username @whyyoutouzhele, is a Twitter account operated by Li Ying (Chinese: 李颖; pinyin: Lǐ Yǐng), a Chinese artist based in Italy. During the 2022 COVID-19 protests in China, the account was used to disseminate information regarding the protests, resulting in international attention due to the extensive censorship of the protests by Chinese authorities. The avatar of the account features a drawing of a tabby cat.

== Background ==
The owner of the Twitter account, Li Ying, was born in 1992 in Anhui.

Li's grandfather was a doctor and officer in the National Revolutionary Army who fought in the Burma campaign during World War II. As a result of ties to the Nationalist movement, Li's grandfather was criticized as a "counter-revolutionary element" during the rule of China under Mao Zedong and as a result, his family moved to southern China to escape persecution. During the late period of the Cultural Revolution, Li's father was a Worker-Peasant-Soldier student who had attended university to become an art teacher. Li's mother is also an art teacher.

Li later recalled that his father's experience gave him a clear understanding of what it feels like to "stand on the wrong side of politics." During his early days, Li claimed that he was an ardent supporter of the Chinese Communist Party before his political views drastically changed after learning about experiences of human rights lawyers such as Pu Zhiqiang online. When he was 19 years old, he held his first exhibition called "Picasso at the Circus" in Jinan, Shandong, which according to him was "mocking an absurd society." He worked part-time as an art teacher and since 2015, he has been living and studying in Italy.

According to MIT Technology Review, Li began paying attention to social issues in China in 2021 and used his account in Sina Weibo to post on-site information submissions from netizens. Due to extensive censorship efforts by Chinese authorities, 49 of his accounts in Weibo were banned. However, his supporters encouraged him and provided their phone numbers so that he could continue to register accounts. In April 2022, he transferred his main communication platform to Twitter.

His handle is a reference to Chinese Foreign Ministry spokesperson Zhao Lijian's comments in 2021 that foreign reporters should touzhele (simplified Chinese: 偷着乐; traditional Chinese: 偷著樂; pinyin: tōuzhelè; lit. 'have fun in secret') or "chuckle to themselves," for being able to live safely in China during the COVID-19 pandemic.

== Covering the 2022 COVID-19 protests in China and aftermath ==
After protests erupted at the Foxconn factory in Zhengzhou, Henan, in November 2022, Li's Twitter account became a medium for online information about the protests, as the account was responsible for receiving and disseminating on-site information. Since Twitter is banned in China, many users used virtual private networks (VPN) to access Twitter and send contributions to Li, who then spread the information, resulting in his gaining 600,000 followers within a week after the outbreak of the protests. The way Li sent and received information subsequently attracted international attention to what was regarded as the largest demonstration movement in China in a generation. As protests spread to other Chinese cities, the account became a primary source cited by international media on the protests and a key source of information for disseminating the situation of demonstrations in China.

According to The New York Times and CNN, he has received more than a thousand pieces of first-hand information from China in a single day. Li also admitted that due to his limited professional level, he could not be 100% sure of the authenticity of the information so he tried to test the authenticity by cross-comparing different videos of an incident. He urged his followers to double-check the details of their submissions before sending it to him, contributing to improvement of the quality of submissions. During this time, he barely had any hours to sleep due to him focusing in the sharing information of the protests online. According to The New York Times, the videos he spread attracted more Chinese people to pay attention to the protests.

The Chinese government launched a severe psychological campaign against Teacher Li and his family, aiming to induce extreme mental stress, fear, and a sense of isolation. Li's family in China is constantly surveilled and has been harassed by the local public security bureau because of his dissemination of sensitive content, according to Li. He said that he has received death threats and that an online test showed that he suffered from severe depression and physical and mental stress. Even so, on 4 December 2022, Li stated on Twitter that he would never commit suicide. He told CNN in an interview that the Twitter account "is more important than his life" and he would not end it. He also further stated that he has arranged someone to take control of his account if something were to happen to him.

In addition to targeting family and friends, Chinese authorities also identify, target, and question mainland users who follow or interact with Teacher Li on X. According to reports, police departments in China have systematically reviewed his follower lists, contacted verified individuals, and in many cases ordered them to undergo forced questioning (喝茶, lit. drink tea) or to unfollow his account. Some followers have reported losing their jobs or receiving repeated police warnings.

== Subsequent events ==
With the end of the protests in December 2022, as of July 2023, Li continued to use the account to share submissions from his followers regarding social issues in China.

In late 2024, Li launched a memecoin named after himself, which generated controversy among his followers, many of whom accused him of exploiting their trust. Li stated that he hoped the coin, whose value fell by 80% shortly after its launch, would help people "unite to build something together".

On March 5, 2026, Italian authorities issued deportation orders against eight Chinese nationals on national security grounds, citing concerns that China was using overseas "police stations" to monitor, harass and threaten Teacher Li. In October 2026, Italian prosecutors were reported to be preparing to criminally charge eight Chinese nationals and two Italian citizens for harassing Li.

== See also ==
- Transnational repression by China
