= Vehicle-ramming attack =

Form of attack in which a perpetrator rams vehicle into people or structures

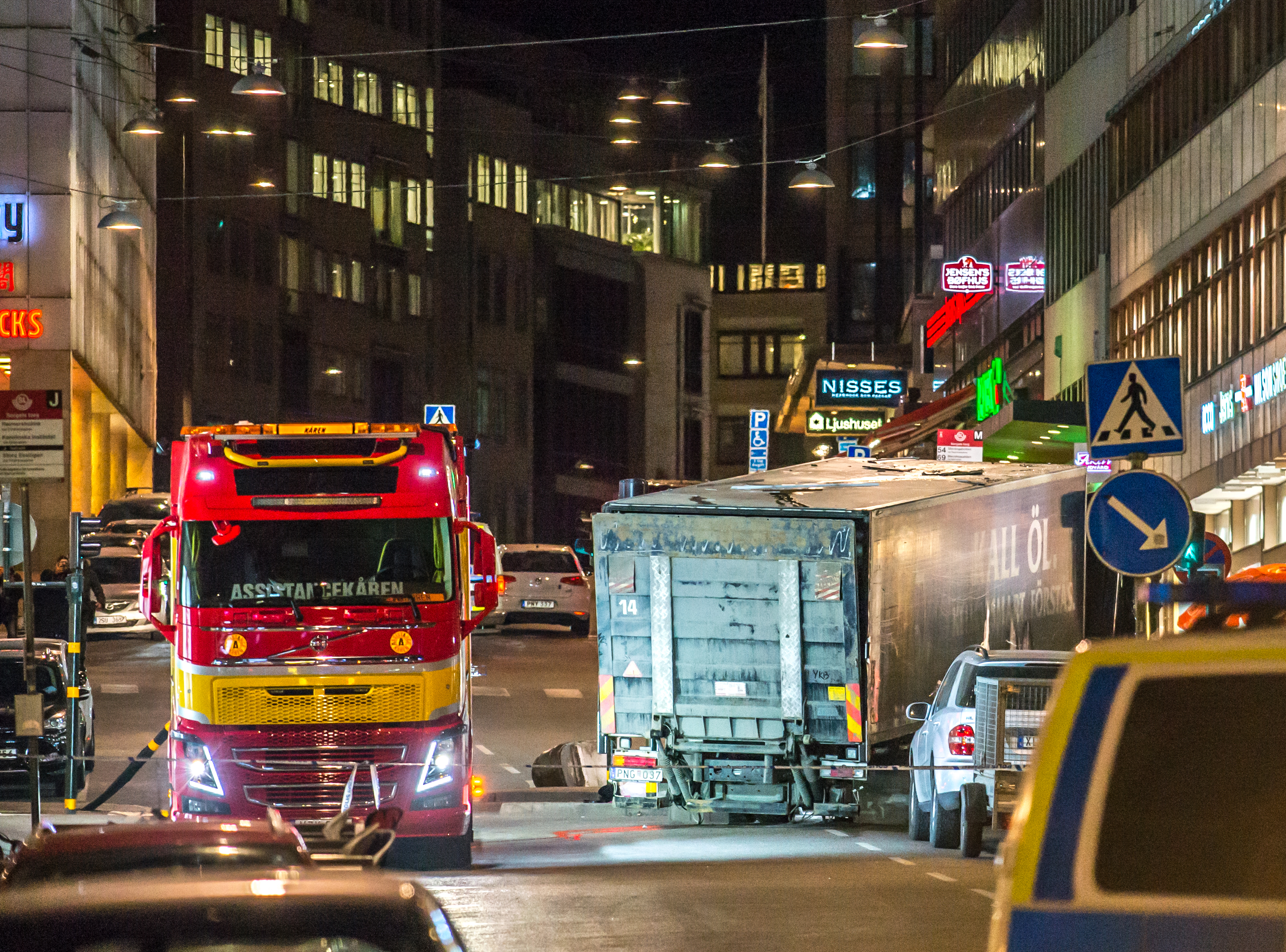
The 2017 Stockholm truck attack killed five.

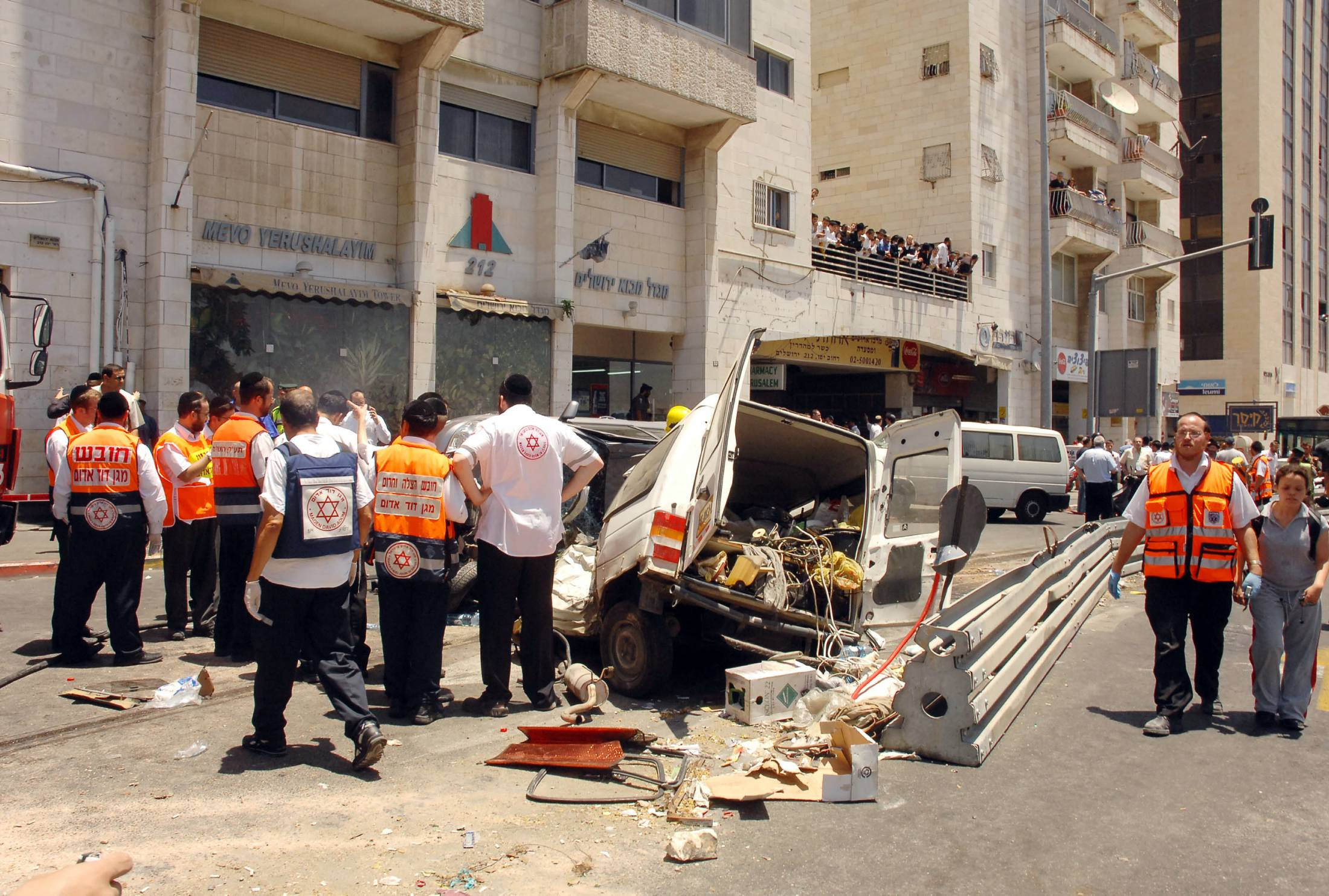
The 2008 Jerusalem bulldozer attack killed three.

A vehicle-ramming attack, also known as a vehicle as a weapon or VAW attack, is an assault in which a perpetrator deliberately rams a vehicle into a building, people, or another vehicle. According to Stratfor Global Intelligence analysts, this attack represents a relatively new militant tactic that could prove more difficult to prevent than suicide bombings.

Deliberate vehicle-ramming into a crowd of people is a tactic used by terrorists, becoming a major terrorist tactic in the 2010s because it requires relatively little skill to perpetrate, motor vehicles are widely available, and it has the potential to cause significant casualties. Deliberate vehicle-ramming has also been carried out in the course of other types of crimes, including road rage incidents. Deliberate vehicle-ramming incidents have also sometimes been ascribed to the driver's psychiatric disorder. (Note: Accidental vehicle ramming causing multiple deaths or injuries to pedestrians or others also occurs, although rarely. Some causes of such accidental mass-casualty vehicular ramming include drunk and drug–impaired driving, or underlying conditions such as dementia, narcolepsy, or epilepsy. See also sudden unintended acceleration.)

Vehicles have also been used by attackers to breach buildings with locked gates, before detonating explosives, as in the Saint-Quentin-Fallavier attack.

== Causes and motives ==
=== Ease ===
According to the U.S. Federal Bureau of Investigation, the tactic has gained popularity because "Vehicle ramming offers terrorists with limited access to explosives or weapons an opportunity to conduct a homeland attack with minimal prior training or experience." Vehicles are as easy to acquire as knives, but unlike knives, which may arouse suspicion if found in one's possession, vehicles are essential for daily life, and the capability of vehicles to cause casualties if used aggressively is underestimated.

=== Islamic terrorism ===
Counterterrorism researcher Daveed Gartenstein-Ross of the Foundation for Defense of Democracies told Slate that the tactic has been on the rise in Israel because, "the security barrier is fairly effective, which makes it hard to get bombs into the country." In 2010, Inspire, the online, English-language magazine produced by al-Qaeda in the Arabian Peninsula urged Mujahideen to choose "pedestrian only" locations and make sure to gain speed before ramming their vehicles into the crowd in order to "achieve maximum carnage".

Vehicle attacks can be carried out by lone-wolf terrorists who are inspired by an ideology but who are not working within a specific political movement or group. Writing for The Daily Beast, Jacob Siegel suggests that the perpetrator of the 2014 Couture-Rouleau attack may be "the kind of terrorist the West could be seeing a lot more of in the future", a kind that he describes, following Brian Jenkins of the Rand Corporation, as "stray dogs", rather than lone wolves, characterizing them as "misfits" who are "moved from seething anger to spontaneous deadly action" by exposure to Islamist propaganda. A 2014 propaganda video by ISIL encouraged French sympathizers to use cars to run down civilians.

According to Clint Watts, of the Foreign Policy Research Institute, where he is a senior fellow and expert on terrorism, the older model where members of groups like al-Qaeda would "plan and train together before going to carry out an attack, became defunct around 2005", due to increased surveillance by Western security agencies. Watts says that Anwar al-Awlaki, the American-born al-Qaeda imam, was a key figure in this shift, addressing English-speakers in their language and urging them to "Do your own terrorism and stay in place."

Jamie Bartlett, who heads the Violence and Extremism Program at Demos, a British think tank, explains that "the internet in the last few years has both increased the possibilities and the likelihood of lone-wolf terrorism", supplying isolated individuals with ideological motivation and technique. For authorities in Western countries, the difficulty is that even in a case like that of the perpetrator of the 2014 Couture-Rouleau attack, where Canadian police had identified the attacker, taken away his passport, and were working with his family and community to steer him away from jihad, vehicle attacks can be hard to prevent because, "it's very difficult to know exactly what an individual is planning to do before a crime is committed. We cannot arrest someone for thinking radical thoughts; it's not a crime in Canada."

According to Stratfor, the American global intelligence firm, "while not thus far as deadly as suicide bombing", this tactic could prove more difficult to prevent. No single group has claimed responsibility for the incidents. Experts see a saving grace in the ignorance and incompetence of most lone-wolf terrorists, who often manage to murder very few people.

At least one Islamic separatist attack has taken place in China the May 2014 Ürümqi attack, which killed 43 and injured more than 90.

=== Protest encounters ===
Vehicular ramming has sometimes been advocated to attack protesters who block public roadways in the United States. Two police officers were suspended and fired in January and June 2016, respectively, for tweeting such advice about Black Lives Matter rallies, which have sometimes been broken up by cars. North Dakota state legislator Keith Kempenich tried and failed to pass a law granting civil immunity to drivers who accidentally hit activists after his mother-in-law was stopped by Dakota Access Pipeline protesters, and Tennessee Senator Bill Ketron did likewise after a man hit an anti-Trump group. Similar legislation has been introduced in Florida and Texas.

In the 2017 Charlottesville car attack, white supremacist James Alex Fields Jr. rammed into counter-protestors during the Unite the Right rally, killing one woman and injuring 35 others.

In the 2026 Delaney Hall protests, there were multiple instances of vehicles ramming into protesters and journalists.

=== Revenge against society ===
"Revenge against society" attacks in China started around the year 2000 with indiscriminate stabbing attacks, usually ending in suicide. Later vehicular ramming became a common method of carrying out these attacks. See for example 2024 Changde car attack, 2024 Zhuhai car attack, 2025 Jinhua car attack and 2026 Beijing ramming attack.

== Protective measures ==
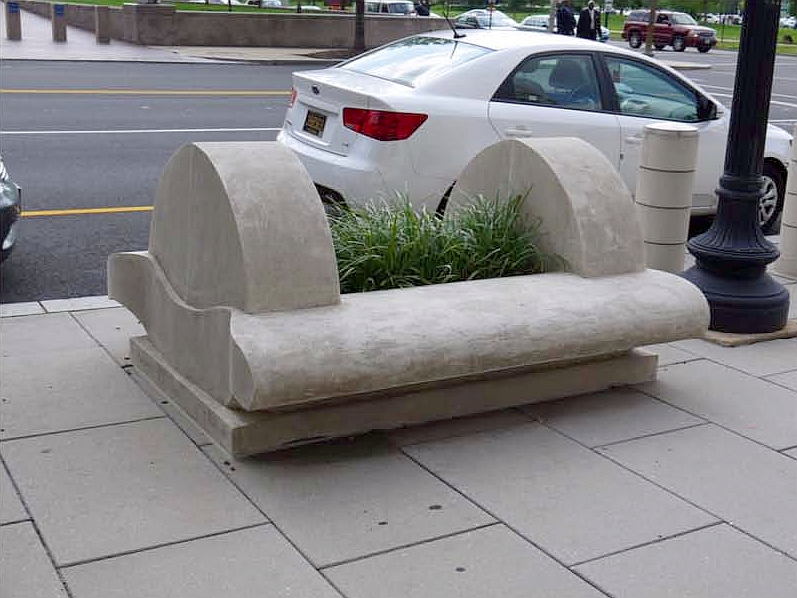
Concrete planters provide protection similar to that of bollards. Washington, DC.

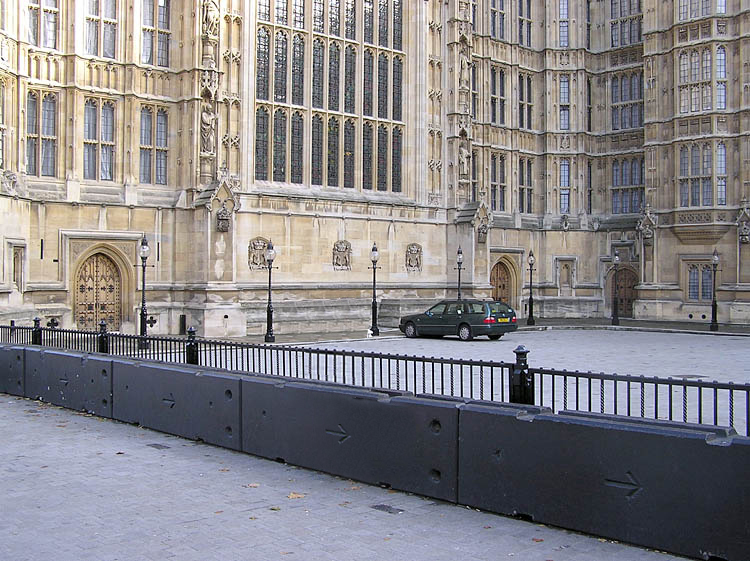
Security measures taken to protect the Houses of Parliament in London, United Kingdom. These heavy blocks of concrete are designed to prevent a car bomb or other device being rammed into the building.

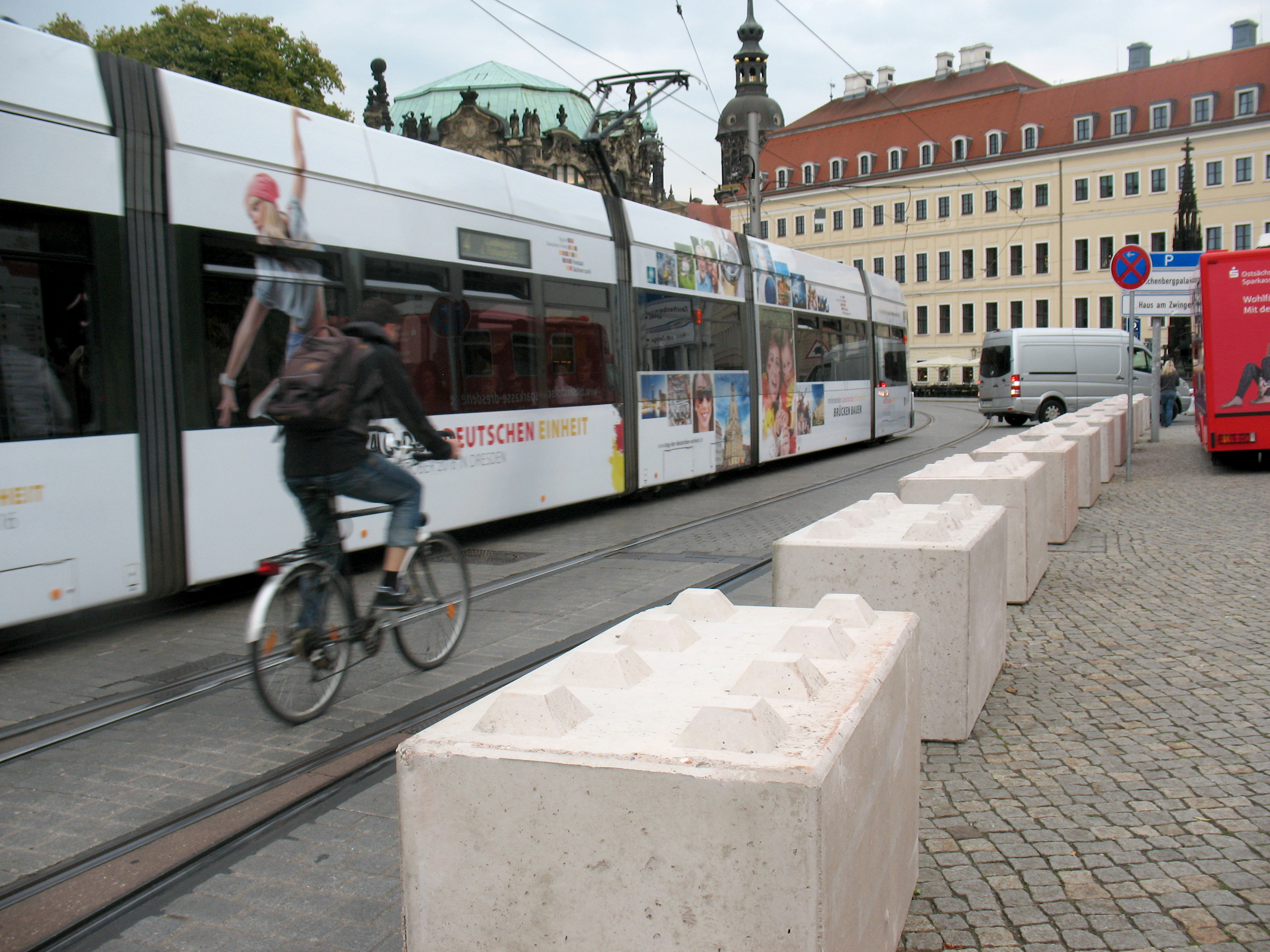
Concrete blocks in the city centre of Dresden during the 2016 German Unity Day Celebrations

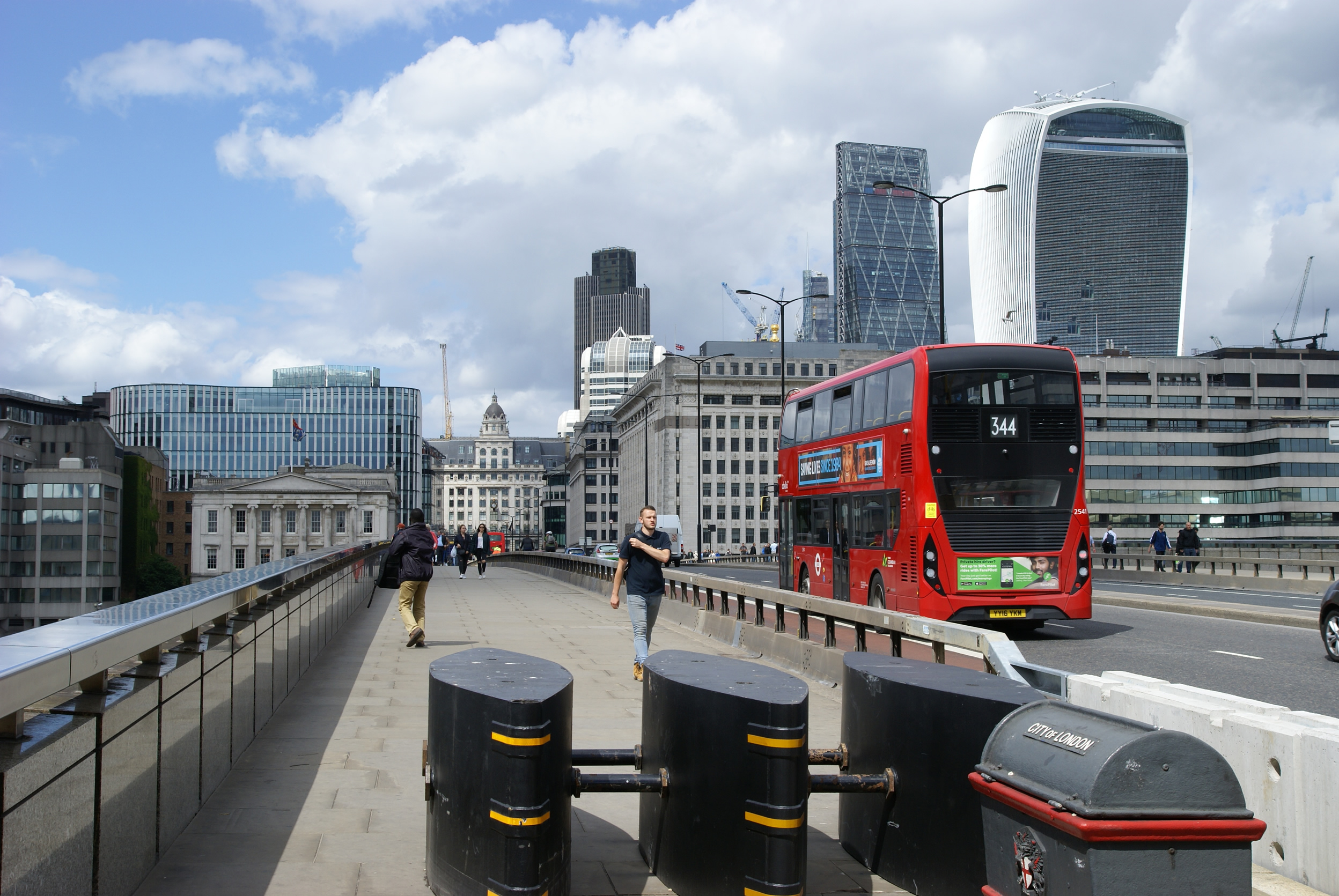
Bollards installed on London Bridge to prevent attacks

Protective measures against vehicle attacks are known as hostile vehicle mitigation. This involves reducing the risk posed by vehicle as a weapon attacks through a mixture of measures. Visibly this often includes physical barriers, but also includes other measures such as deterrence, staff training, traffic management, and incident response planning.

Security bollards are credited with minimizing damage and casualties in the 2007 Glasgow Airport attack, and with preventing ramming in the 2014 Alon Shvut stabbing attack, leading the assailant to abandon his car and attack pedestrians waiting at a bus stop with a knife, after his effort to run them over was thwarted. However, Berlin's police chief, Klaus Kandt, argued that bollards would not have prevented the 2016 Berlin truck attack, and that the required security measures would be "varied, complex, and far from a panacea".

On 23 October 2014, the US National Institute of Building Sciences updated its Building Design Guideline on Crash- and Attack-Resistant Models of bollards, a guideline written to help professionals design bollards to protect facilities from vehicle operators, "who plan or carry out acts of property destruction, incite terrorism, or cause the deaths of civilian, industrial or military populations". The American Bar Association recommends bollards as effective protection against car-ramming attacks.

In January 2018, it was announced by the then mayor of New York City, Bill de Blasio, that the city planned to install 1,500 steel street barriers to prevent vehicle attacks. This came after the city's two vehicle-ramming attacks in 2017 killed nine people.

Münster has been planning to install security bollards in public areas in response to vehicle-ramming attacks in European cities, including the Berlin attack. While only selected locations can be protected this way, tight bends and restricted-width streets may also prevent a large vehicle getting speed before reaching a barrier.

Modern Internet-connected drive-by-wire cars can potentially be hacked remotely and used for such attacks. In 2015, to demonstrate the severity of this type of attack, hackers remotely carjacked a Jeep from 10 miles away and drove it into a ditch. Measures for cybersecurity of automobiles to prevent such attacks are often criticized as being insufficient.

In Toronto, older transit buses and sanitation vehicles are used as anti-ramming barricades, providing a more benign public experience. More recently, permanent hostile vehicle mitigation (HVM) barriers have been installed around Union Station, replacing temporary Jersey barriers that had been in place since 2018 following the Toronto van attack. The installation includes PAS 68-certified Counter Terror (CT) Blocks manufactured by Townscape Products, designed to provide permanent vehicle mitigation while maintaining pedestrian access.

== See also ==
- Improvised weapon
- Ram-raiding
- Vehicular homicide
