= List of rampage killers in China =

This is a list of mass or spree killers in China. A mass murderer is typically defined as someone who kills three or more people in one incident, with no "cooling off" period, not including themselves. A mass murder typically occurs in a single location where one or more persons kill several others.

This list does not include serial killers or major figures in politics and government who orchestrated such actions.

== Rampage killers ==
Perpetrator	Date	Year	Location	Province	Killed	Injured	W	Additional notes	Ref
Feng Wanhai, 26 (冯万海); Jiang Liming, 22 (姜立明)	Nov 18	1995	Zhaodong	Heilongjiang	32	16	F V	Feng was killed by police Jiang committed suicide	
Tian Mingjian, 30 (Note: Assailant was a member of the military, police, or a comparable force at the time of the rampage.) (田明建)	Sep 20	1994	Beijing	Beijing	28	47	F	Killed by police	
Yu Shennian (于盛年); Yu Xinian (于喜年)	Apr 13	1980	Dandong	Liaoning	26	38	FEA	Killed each other in a shootout	
Unknown	Feb 10	2024	Zhaike	Shandong	21+	20+	FM		
Yang Qingpei, 27 (Note: At least one of the victims was a relative of the assailant.) (杨清培)	Sep 29	2016	Qujing	Yunnan	19	0	M	Sentenced to death	
Huang Guozhen (黄国桢)	March 19	1989	Nafang	Guangxi	17	1	MA	Sentenced to death and executed	
Yang Zanyun, 54 (阳赞云)	Sep 12	2018	Mishui	Hunan	15	43	MV	Sentenced to death and executed	
Yuan Daizhong, 41 (袁代中)	Nov 18	2004	Yueyang & Xima	Chongqing	14	29	ME	Committed suicide	
Hu Wenhai, 46 (胡文海)	Oct 26	2001	Yuci	Shanxi	14	3	F	Sentenced to death and executed Case adapted into a movie, A Touch of Sin	
Wang Yunlong (王云龙)	Aug 11	1982	Langfang	Hebei	13	17	MV	Sentenced to death Also killed three horses	
Ma Jianwei (马建伟)	July 10	1979	Jiagedaqi	Heilongjiang	13	?	F	Killed by soldiers	
Zhou Jianxiong (周建雄)	March 7/10	1976	Nafeng	Guangxi	12	10	FMA	Shot dead	
Shi Yuejun, 35 (石悦军)	Sep 24–29	2006	Liuhe & Tonghua county	Jilin	12	5	M	Sentenced to death and executed	
Wu ---， (吴)	March 2	2012	Taiyuan	Shanxi	12	1	MA	Committed suicide	
Li Zhenxiu (李振修)	May 28	1973	Xianhu	Guangxi	11	9	M	Killed by angry mob	
Qiu Xinghua, 47 (邱兴华)	July 14/31	2006	Ankang & Suizhou	Shaanxi; Hubei	11	2	MA	Sentenced to death and executed	
Zhang Yimin, 40 (张义民)	Feb 1	2010	Tianjin	Tianjin	10	10–11	MV	Committed suicide	
Huang Guobiao (黄国标)	Jan 3	1983	Gebu	Guangxi	10	7		Sentenced to death	
Nie Laozhan (聂老占)	Aug 29	1952	Yangxi	Guangxi	10	2	M	Sentenced to death and executed	
Zhou Yuxin, 33 (周宇欣)	April 13/14	2011	Ertaizi	Liaoning	10	0	M	Sentenced to death	
Zhang Shaoxin (张绍新)	March 27	1966	Hengtang	Guangxi	10	?	M	Sentenced to death and executed	
Yang Mingxin, 39 (杨铭心)	June 23	1998	Chenggu	Shaanxi	9	3	M		
Lai Guoxian (赖国贤)	March 31	1990	Houmeng	Guangxi	9	2	M	Sentenced to death and executed	
Yan Jianzhong, 38 (闫建忠)	Sep 7	2002	Beijing	Beijing	9	1	M	Sentenced to death and executed	
Qiu Rihui, 48 (邱日辉)	Dec 25	2018	Longyan	Fujian	8	25	MV	Sentenced to death and executed Terminated a pregnancy	
Xu Jiajin, 21	Nov 16	2024	Wuxi	Jiangsu	8	17	M	Sentenced to death and executed	
Zhao Xiaodong, 23 (赵晓东)	Jan 4/17	1987	Luoyang	Henan	8	9	FMO	Killed by police	
Zhu Hanbiao, 34 (朱汉标)	May 13	2001	Shenzhen	Guangdong	8	4−7	MV	Killed by police	
Chen Xuerong (陳雪蓉)	April 5	1993	Chongqing	Chongqing	8	3	F	Committed suicide	
Zhou Zhenqiong (周振琼); Zhou Zhenwei (周振维)	Nov 24	1988	Lichuan	Hubei	8	1	M	Both sentenced to death and executed	
Li Zhixing (李志星)	April 21	2003	Malipo	Henan	8	1	M	Committed suicide	
Zhao Haiwei, 48 (赵海为)	March 3	2004	Fu-an village	Jilin	8	0		Committed suicide	
Unknown	Dec 26	2007	Hong'an	Hubei	8	0	M		
Xiong Zhenlin, 34 (熊振林)	Jan 4	2009	Luoyang Town	Hubei	8	0	M	Sentenced to death and executed	
Zhou Yezhong, 35 (周叶忠)	May 8	2010	Chengyuan	Jiangxi	8	0	M	Sentenced to death and executed	
Zhang Shengli (張勝利)	June 10	2002	Kaifeng	Henan	8	?	M	Sentenced to death	
Huang Yachun (黄雅春)	Dec 14	1990	Honghua	Guangxi	7	19	M	Sentenced to death and executed	
Wu Liang, 25 (吴亮)	June 5	2021	Anqing	Anhui	7	13	M	Sentenced to death and executed	
Wang Xiwen, 32 (王锡文)	Nov 17/18	1980	Handan	Hebei	7	12	F E	Sentenced to death and executed	
Yang Moufeng (杨谋峰)	Dec 27	2020	Kaiyuan	Liaoning	7	7	M	Arrested	
Zhang Rong, 22 (张荣)	Sep 30	2002	Taijiang County	Guizhou	7	6	M	Killed by police	
Song Jinming (宋金明)	July 11/12	1993	Luzhai County & Liuzhou	Guangxi	7	2	F	Sentenced to death	
Tian Zhaokai (田兆凱)	Nov	1998	Wugu	Yunnan	7	2	FM	Killed by police	
Hou Juqiang, 37 (侯居强)	Nov 25	2008	Dingtao County	Shandong	7	2	M	Sentenced to death Also killed three dogs	
Wang Mouliang, 57 (王某良)	Nov 7	2022	Shangzhou	Shaanxi	7	2	M	Committed suicide	
Liu Yimin (刘以民)	Aug 2	2002	Xihai'an & Suyu District	Jiangsu	7	0	M	Sentenced to death	
Hu Yunchao, 37 (胡云超)	March 1	2009	Jiekui	Guizhou	7	0	M	Sentenced to death	
Liu Yinger (刘迎儿)	Oct 1	2010	Xing County	Shanxi	7	0	M	Sentenced to death and executed	
Wei Xiaojun, 67 (魏晓军)	Feb 16	2021	Bei'an	Heilongjiang	7	0	F	Committed suicide	
Unknown	Dec	1969	Lhasa	Tibet	7	?			
Xu Yaoquan (许耀全)	Sep 24	1970	Huancheng	Guangxi	7	?	M	Shot dead	
Cen Manyi, 21 (岑满意)	May 19	2002	Changfeng County	Anhui	7	?	M	Killed by police	
Zhao Zihui (赵子辉)	March 27	2014	Huairou	Beijing	6	12	M	Sentenced to death	
Yusufu Ismail, 40 (玉素甫·司馬義)	Feb 20	2005	Shanshan County	Xinjiang	6	8	M	Committed suicide	
Cui Lidong, 44 (崔立冬)	March 22	2019	Zaoyang	Hubei	6	8	MV	Killed by police	
Chen Yuhuang, 27 (陈玉煌)	July 21	2002	Zhumei	Guangxi	6	7	MO	Sentenced to death	
Yang Jia, 27 (杨佳)	July 1	2008	Shanghai	Shanghai	6	4	MA	Sentenced to death and executed	
Liang Jiqian, 52 (梁积倩)	April 28	2006	Yingxue Village	Guangxi	6	1	M	Sentenced to death and executed	
Zhang Jinfu, 39 (张金富)	Aug 2	2008	Xuyang	Hubei	6	1	M	Sentenced to death	
Nie Luyong, 26 (聂露勇)	Jan 15/16/17	2016	Hengshan	Hunan	6	1	M	Sentenced to death and executed	
Xing Guoping, 36 (邢国平)	Oct 31	2007	Sanyo District	Henan	6	0	F	Sentenced to death and executed	
Liu Zhiqiang (劉志強)	July	1988	Tangshan	Hebei	6	?	F	Committed suicide	
Zhao Xiang, 23 (赵高祥)	June 10	2005	Zhoukou	Henan	5	7	M	Killed by police	
Cui Zhenyu, 25 (崔振宇)	Aug 17	2014	Yanji	Jilin	4	11	M	Sentenced to death and executed	
Unknown	April 4	2026	Shenyang	Liaoning	4-6+	10	M	Jumped to his death	
Qian Minghai, 29 (钱明海)	Jan 21	2003	Foping County	Shaanxi	4	8	MA	Sentenced to death	
Xin Haiping (辛海平)	June 22	2018	Xi'an	Shaanxi	4	7	M	Sentenced to death and executed	
Ye --- (叶)	May 27	2011	Yeshangzhuang	Jiangsu	4	6	M	Attempted suicide	
Liu Shuangrui, 55 (劉雙瑞)	June 9	2015	Suning County	Hebei	4	3–5	F	Shot dead	
Du Xiwen, 22 (杜喜文)	Sep 2/6	2000	Dalian	Liaoning	3	18–19	MV	Sentenced to death	
Lin Weihu, 37 (林伟虎)	Sep 30	2024	Songjiang	Shanghai	3	15	M	Arrested	
Wang Cunyi, 42 (王存益)	Oct 6	2018	Ningbo	Zhejiang	3	15	MV	Sentenced to death and executed	

== Home intruders ==
Perpetrator	Date	Year	Location	Killed	Injured	W	Additional notes	Ref.
Guo Zhongmin, 36 (郭忠民)	Feb 18	2003	Yangxiaoxiang	13	0	M	Committed suicide	
Wan Yu Ciang, 40	Aug 3	1956	Fenglai	10	1–2	M	Killed by police	
Jian Xueliang, 35 (Note: All the victims were members of the same family.) (简学良)	Aug 13	2004	Mingxing Village	8	0	M	Sentenced to death and executed	
Li Shuishui (李性水); Hu Chunxiu (胡春秀)	Dec 23	2004	Nanqiao, Liling	8	0	E	Both sentenced to death	
Zheng Lu, 32 (Note: All the victims were killed in the same household.) (鄭魯)	Sep 3/4	2011	Xuyi County	7	0	M	Sentenced to death and executed Also killed a dog Terminated two pregnancies	
Yu Qiang (余强)	May 3	2005	Nanchang	6	1	M	Sentenced to death and executed	
Xu Lian, 19 (徐立安)	June 26	2007	Yangshuo	6	1	M	Sentenced to death	
Zhang Zexiao, 22	Dec 25	1983	Nansi	6	0		Sentenced to death	
He Desheng (贺德胜)	Aug 1	1990	Laoshan Village	6	0	M	Sentenced to death and executed	
Pang Jinmou (庞金某)	May 9	2014	Dongpanjiatun Village	6	0	M	Committed suicide	
Unknown, 64	4 July	2024	Shenyang	3	1	M	Arrested by police	

== Vehicular homicides ==
Name	Date	Year	Location	Killed	Injured	W	Additional notes	Ref.
Fan Weiqiu, 62 (樊维秋)	November 11	2024	Zhuhai	38	47	V	Sentenced to death and executed	
Li Baoping (李宝平)	July 12	1983	Changde	21	29	V	Sentenced to death and executed	
Zhang Baogang, 52 (张包钢) or (张某钢)	July 7	2020	Hongshan Reservoir	20	16	V	Died in the crash	
Wu Yuansong, 40 (吴元松)	January 26 – February 21	1998	Putian	9	8	V	Sentenced to death and executed	
Lin Jianxin, 37 (林建新)	April 28	2014	Minhou County	7	15	V	Sentenced to death and executed	
Wen Qingyun, 22 (温庆运)	January 11	2023	Guangzhou	6	29	V	Sentenced to death and executed	
Liu Danao, 59 (刘大孬)	June 1	2010	Zhengzhou	6	20+	V	Sentenced to death	
Luo Xiaoji, 34 (骆效计)	November 5	2008	Zhuhai	5	19	V	Killed by police	
Yao Jinyun, 23 (姚锦云)	January 10	1982	Beijing	5	19	V	Sentenced to death and executed	
Liu Dong, 31 (刘东)	May 23	2021	Dalian	5	8	V	Sentenced to death and executed	
Li Chenggang (李成刚)	April 25	2011	Changsha	5	5	V	Sentenced to death	
Hu Jiabing, 42 (胡家兵)	January 19	2016	Yichun, Jiangxi	4	18	V	Sentenced to death and executed	
Li Guoqing, 46 (李国清)	June 23	2009	Huicheng, Huizhou	4	11	V	Sentenced to death and executed	
Bao, ---, 57 (包)	July 7	2017	Jingjiang	4	9	V		

== Other incidents ==
This section lists killers in China for mass murders by single perpetrators that do not fit into the upper categories, like arson fires, poisonings, bombings, deliberate airliner crashes and train derailments caused by sabotage. Cases with more than one offender are not included

Name	Date	Year	Location	Province	Killed	Injured	W	Additional notes	Ref.
Lai Sanyang, 23 (赖三羊)	March 9	1978	Guangzhou	Guangdong	133	28	E	Died in the explosion of ship 160, which he caused	
Unknown	March 21	2022	Teng County	Guangxi	131	0	V	Died in the crash of China Eastern Airlines Flight 5735, which they caused	
Jiang Xiaofeng, 21 (蒋晓峰)	Oct 4	1990	Guangzhou	Guangdong	127	53	V	Died in the crash of Xiamen Airlines Flight 8301, which he caused	
Zhang Pilin, 37 (张丕林)	May 7	2002	Dalian	Liaoning	111	0	A	Died in the crash of China Northern Airlines Flight 6136, which he caused	
Jin Ruchao, 41 (靳如超)	March 9/16	2001	Maguan County; Shijiazhuang	Yunnan; Hebei	109	38	ME	Sentenced to death and executed	
Ma Hongqing, 50 (马宏清)	July 16	2001	Mafang	Shaanxi	89+	98+	E	Sentenced to death and executed	
Xu Fenghao (徐凤浩), Xu Fengde (徐凤德)	December 1	1979	Qitaihe	Heilongjiang	86	222	E	Both sentenced to death and executed	
Dong Yangling, 20 (董扬玲)	Dec 13	1993	Fuzhou	Fujian	61	15	A	Sentenced to death and executed for arson	
Tan Zhixin, 24 (谭智鑫)	Nov 26	1993	Hunan	Hunan	60	21	E	Killed by the explosion	
Chen Shuizong, 59 (陈水总)	June 7	2013	Xiamen	Fujian	46	34	A	Perished in the flames	
Chen Zhengping, 32 (陈正平)	Sep 15	2002	Nanjing	Jiangsu	42	300–400	P	Sentenced to death and executed for poisoning	
Li Chuicai, 33 (李垂才)	March 6	2001	Wanzai County	Jiangxi	42	27	E	Killed by the explosion	
Liu Zhanjin, 34 (刘占金)	March 29	2000	Shajian	Shanxi	39	50+	E	Killed by the explosion	
Huang Kefen, 27 (黄可芬)	June 24	1981	Xiamen	Fujian	39	73	E	Killed by the explosion	
Chen Tianfu (陈某某)	Oct 27	2007	Putian	Fujian	37	21	A	Confessed to causing the Putian factory fire, later recanted	
Wei Mou (魏某)	July 29	1983	Guojiatun	Hebei	32	94	E	Killed by the explosion	
Qiu Fengguo, 23 (邱凤国)	Feb 15	1986	Jilin	Jilin	32	32	E	Killed by the explosion	
Xu Tingjian, 18 (徐廷建)	Sep 12	1997	Pujiang	Zhejiang	32	4	A	Sentenced to death for arson	
Gao Haiping, 24 (高海平)	July 22	1981	Yangquan	Shanxi	31	127	E	Killed by the explosion	
Unknown	Dec 11	1997	Harbin	Heilongjiang	31	24	A	Sentenced to death for arson	
Yu Xiugang, 21 (余修刚)	April 14	1988	Yujia	Hebei	30	18	E	Killed by the explosion	
Zhang Yunliang, 62 (张云良)	June 5	2009	Chengdu	Sichuan	26	76	A	Perished in the flames	
Unknown	April 9	2001	Haifeng	Guangdong	24	0	A	Perished in the flames	
Zhou Wenzhi, 25 (周文志)	June 26	1989	Shanghai	Shanghai	23	39	E	Killed by the explosion	
Dong Chuansheng, 57 (董川生)	July 4	2010	Wuxi	Jiangsu	23	19	A	Perished in the flames	
Ma Yongping, 33 (马永平)	Jan 5	2016	Yinchuan	Ningxia	18	32	A	Sentenced to death and executed	
Liu Chunlu, 32 (刘纯露)	April 24	2018	Qingyuan	Guangdong	18	5	A	Sentenced to death and executed	
Unknown	July 17	1990	Xiamen	Fujian	17–19	50–90	E	Killed by the explosion	
Hu Baoqiang, 45 (胡保强)	May 5	2008	Wenzhou	Zhejiang	17	40	E	Committed suicide	
Liu Weixiong, 31 (刘卫雄)	Feb 4	2008	Taizhou	Zhejiang	17	6	A	Sentenced to death and executed	
Chen Zhenpei (陈振培)	Feb 16	1992	Yichang	Hubei	16	38	E	Sentenced to death and executed	
Cao Jun (曹骏); Zou Changli (邹昌力)	Feb 14	1998	Wuhan	Hubei	16	22–30	E	Both killed in the explosion	
Liu Aibing, 34 (刘爱兵)	Dec 12	2009	Anhua County	Hunan	13	1	A	Sentenced to death and executed	
Zhang Zongling (张宗玲)	Oct 30	1994	Jinan	Shandong	12	2	A	Sentenced to death and executed	
Liu Shiliang, 38 (刘士亮)	June 13	1999	Xiaoguanxin Village	Shandong	12	1	P	Sentenced to death and executed	
Cong Weizi (丛威滋)	May 9	2017	Weihai	Shandong	12	0	A	Committed suicide	
Gao Wanfeng, 55 (高万峰)	Jan 11	2013	Shuangyashan	Heilongjiang	11	35	E	Committed suicide	
Liu Quanshun, 45 (刘泉顺)	Jan 15	2012	Shangdian Natural Village	Fujian	11	1	A	Sentenced to death	
Jiang Dayong (姜大永)	Nov 14	2007	Chengde County	Hebei	11	0	A	Sentenced to death	
Wei Yinyong, 33 (韦银勇)	Sep 30	2015	Liucheng	Guangxi	10	51	E	Killed by the explosion	
Sun Liyou, 26 (孙立友)	Sep 16	2007	Liuyang	Hunan	10	23	E	Killed by the explosion	
Chen Zhenglong (陈正龙)	Dec 10	1982	Panzhihua	Sichuan	10	15	E	Sentenced to death and executed	
Bai Qinghua, 50 (白青华)	Jan 20	2005	Karamay District	Xinjiang	10	7	E	Killed by the explosion	
Wang Gui, 45 (王贵)	July 26	2013	Heilongjiang	Heilongjiang	10	2	A	Perished in the flames	
Unknown	April	1981	Shanghai	Shanghai	9–15	?	E	Killed by the explosion	
Wang Zhigang, 30 (王志刚)	Oct 29	1980	Beijing	Beijing	9	89	E	Killed by the explosion	
Ji Zhongxian, 28 (季重贤)	May 7	1979	Chengdu	Sichuan	9	16	E	Killed by the explosion	
Luo Hengxi (罗恒西)	June 8	2005	Baita Town	Hebei	9	8	E	Killed by the explosion	
Li Qiang, 31 (李强)	Oct 21	2001	Linyi	Shandong	8	52	E	Sentenced to death and executed	
Lin Binwei, 25 (林斌伟)	Feb 23	2013	Wenling	Zhejiang	8	17	A	Sentenced to death and executed	
Lu Wenfeng (吕文峰)	June 3	2006	Jixian County	Heilongjiang	8	6	E	Killed by the explosion	
Xu Taoran, 22 (许陶然)	June 15	2017	Jiangsu Province	Jiangsu	7	65	E	Killed by the explosion	
Chen Xilin, 55 (陈释麟)	Feb 13	2013	Zhanjiang	Guangdong	7	18	E	Committed suicide	
Lu Haifeng, 34 (卢海峰)	Feb 5	2019	Long County	Shaanxi	7	1	A	Sentenced to death and executed	
Su Dahua (苏大华)	Feb 27	2014	Guiyang	Guizhou	6	35	A	Sentenced to death and executed	
Huang Tianyong, 32 (黄天勇)	June 18	1990	Xinyi Village	Sichuan	6	21	E	Killed by the explosion	
Yin Kaihua (殷开华)	June 26	2000	Qiluogou Village	Sichuan	6	6	E	Sentenced to death	
Yan Xueguo (颜学国)	Dec 24	2005	Qixing Village	Chongqing	5	27	P	Sentenced to death	
Zhong Yongjin, 51 (钟永金)	Feb 12	2003	Shifang	Sichuan	5	14	P	Committed suicide	
Dong Shihou, 29 (董世侯)	April 3	1968	Beijing	Beijing	4	105	E	Killed by the explosion	

== Familicides ==
The victims must have been largely the relatives of the perpetrator to be considered a familicide.

Perpetrator	Date	Year	Location	Province	Killed	Injured	W	Additional Notes	Ref.
Ouyang Pu (欧阳普)	Jan 1	1976	Zixing	Hunan	17	0	M	Committed suicide	
Liu Aibing, 34* (刘爱兵)	Dec 12	2009	Yinshanpai	Hunan	13	1	FMA	Sentenced to death and executed	
Jia Yingmin, 40 (賈英民)	Oct 6	2000	Kunlong	Shaanxi	12	0	M	Committed suicide	
Wang Changyi, 30 (王昌义)	Aug 1	2006	Mengzi County	Yunnan	10	1	M	Committed suicide, Also killed a pig, a dog and a cat	
Chai Gongmin, 21 (柴公敏)	Feb 12	2008	Baoding	Hebei	10	0	M	Sentenced to death	
He Xiangyue* (何祥月)	March 20	2005	Yibin	Sichuan	9	?	M	Sentenced to death and executed	
Feng Zhongyou, 25 (冯忠友)	Nov 16	2004	Bohuo	Yunnan	7	1	M	Committed suicide	
Wu Shouguo, 38* (武守国)	Feb 14	2015	Xiaonangou	Hebei	7	0	M	Committed suicide	
Chen Qian, 29 (陈谦)	Dec 27/28	2009	Qinghe County	Hebei	6	5	FM	Committed suicide	
Song Shuangxi	July	1986	Hubei	Hubei	6	3	M	Committed suicide	
Wen Tieshuan, 49* (温铁栓)	Nov 26	2009	Qingshuihe County	Inner Mongolia	6	1	M	Committed suicide	
Ma Yanshan, 36* (马燕山)	May 2	2002	Ürümqi	Xinjiang	6	0	M	Sentenced to death	
Huang Wenyi, 34 (黄文义)	Dec 28	2006	Foshan	Guangdong	6	0	M	Sentenced to death	
Dong Gang, 29* (董刚)	Feb 24	2007	Helong	Jilin	6	0	M	Sentenced to death	
Chen Wenfa, 21* (陈文法)	Nov 16	2009	Wumeng	Yunnan	6	0	M	Found not guilty by reason of insanity	
Li Lei, 28* (李磊)	Nov 23	2009	Beijing	Beijing	6	0	M	Sentenced to death	
Jiang Shunmao	March 23	1981	Gongcheng	Guangxi	6	?	E	Committed suicide	
Li Bingzhang (李炳章)	March 8	2003	Beiliu City	Guangxi	6	?		Sentenced to death	

== See also ==
- List of serial killers in China

== Notes ==
=== Abbreviations ===
W – A basic description of the weapons used in the murders

F – Firearms and other ranged weapons, especially rifles and handguns, but also bows and crossbows, grenade launchers, flamethrowers, or slingshots
M – Melee weapons, like knives, swords, spears, machetes, axes, clubs, rods, stones, or bare hands
O – Any other weapons, such as bombs, hand grenades, Molotov cocktails, poison and poisonous gas, as well as vehicle and arson attacks

A – indicates that an arson attack was the only other weapon used
V – indicates that a vehicle was the only other weapon used
E – indicates that explosives of any sort were the only other weapon used
P – indicates that an anaesthetising or deadly substance of any kind was the only other weapon used (includes poisonous gas)
