= List of rampage killers =

This is a list of mass or spree killers. A mass murderer is typically defined as someone who kills two or more people in one incident, with no "cooling off" period, not including themselves. A mass murder typically occurs in a single location where one or more persons kill several others.

Specific subtypes of mass murder, including politically motivated crimes, workplace killings, school attacks and familicides, have their own lists.

This list does not include serial killers or major government/political figures who orchestrated such actions.

== African killers ==
Only the first 15 entries are shown here. For the entire list see: List of rampage killers in Africa

Perpetrator	Date	Year	Location	Country	Killed	Injured	W	Additional notes	Ref.
Unek, William (Note: Assailant was a member of the military, police, or a comparable force at the time of the rampage.) (Note: At least one of the victims was a relative of the assailant.)	--- Feb 11–16	1954; 1957	Mahagi Malampaka	Belgian Congo; Tanganyika	22 36	--- 32+	M FMA	Killed by police	
Komakech, Richard	June 26	1994	Kampala	Uganda	26	13	F	Killed by the father of one of his victims	
Unknown police officer	April 15	1983	Asureti	Uganda	21	?	F	Committed suicide	
Jaafar	June 29	2003	Didessa	Ethiopia	17	45	F	Fled and captured	
Abdul Razeq Abdullah Rifai, Omar, 28	Aug 21	2013	Meet Al Attar	Egypt	15	?	F	Killed by villagers	
Unknown soldier	Nov 6	1995	Nshili	Rwanda	14–17	19	FM	Committed suicide	
Dhendonga, Longo	July 30	2020	Sange	Democratic Republic of the Congo	14	10	F	Sentenced to death	
Ogwang, Alfred, 28	Dec 26	1994	Kamwenge	Uganda	13	14	F	Sentenced to death; commuted to life imprisonment	
Unknown	Nov 5	2016	Juba	South Sudan	13	10	F	Unsolved	
Opetu, Babby Ndombe	July 22	2023	Nyakova	Democratic Republic of the Congo	13	2	F	Sentenced to death	
Nasha, Fekadu	May 12	2013	Bahir Dar	Ethiopia	12–18	2	F	Died	
Mogo	May 12	1929	Kitale	Kenya	12	1	M	Sentenced to death and executed	
Ben Jebir, 28	Mar 25	1985	Fahs	Tunisia	12	?	F	Committed suicide Terminated a pregnancy	
Vukwana, Bulelani, 29	Feb 9	2002	East London	South Africa	11	6	F	Committed suicide	
Amanyire, Chris	April 11	2014	Karugutu	Uganda	10	25	F	Committed suicide	

== Americas ==
Only the first 15 entries are shown here. For the entire list see: List of rampage killers in the Americas and List of rampage killers in the United States

Perpetrator	Date	Year	Location	Country	Killed	Injured	W	Additional notes	Ref.
Gonźalez, Julio, 36	March 25	1990	Bronx, New York	United States	87	6	A	Worst act of mass murder committed by a lone perpetrator in the United States.	
Paddock, Stephen Craig, 64	Oct 1	2017	Paradise, Nevada	United States	60	413+	F	Committed suicide Two of the victims died in 2019 and 2020; attributed to this event	
Gonzales, Francisco Paula, 27	May 7	1964	Danville, California	United States	43	0	F V	Committed suicide	
Delgado Morales, Campo Elías, 52	Dec 4	1986	Bogotá	Colombia	29	12	FMA	Killed by police	
Kelley, Devin Patrick, 26	Nov 5	2017	Sutherland Springs, Texas	United States	26	22	F	Committed suicide Terminated a pregnancy	
Hennard, George Pierre, 35	Oct 16	1991	Killeen, Texas	United States	23	27	F V	Committed suicide	
Wortman, Gabriel, 51	April 18/19	2020	Nova Scotia	Canada	22	3	F A	Killed by police Terminated a pregnancy Also killed two dogs	
Kenney, John Edward, 27	June. 21	1977	Saint John, New Brunswick	Canada	21	?	A		
Huberty, James Oliver, 41	July 18	1984	San Diego, California	United States	21	19	F	Killed by police Terminated a pregnancy	
Card, Robert Russell, 40	Oct 25	2023	Lewiston, Maine	United States	18	13	F	Committed suicide	
Ferreira de França, Genildo, 27	May 21/22	1997	Santo Antônio do Potengi	Brazil	14	1	F	Committed suicide	
Wong, Jiverly Antares, 41	April 3	2009	Binghamton, New York	United States	13	4	F	Committed suicide	
Unruh, Howard Barton, 28	Sep 6	1949	Camden, New Jersey	United States	13	3	F	Found mentally unfit to stand trial	
Holmes, James Eagan, 24	July 20	2012	Aurora, Colorado	United States	12	62	F E	Sentenced to life imprisonment	
Sanderson, Myles, 32	Sep 4	2022	James Smith Cree Nation & Weldon	Canada	11	17	M	Died in police custody	

== Asia ==
Only the first 15 entries are shown here. For the entire list see: List of rampage killers in Asia and List of rampage killers in China

Perpetrator	Date	Year	Location	Country	Killed	Injured	W	Additional notes	Ref.
Woo Bum-kon, 27 (우범곤)	April 26/27	1982	Uiryeong	South Korea	56–62	≈ 35	FME	Committed suicide Seven of the victims died later on; attributed to this event	
Fan Weiqiu, 62 (樊维秋)	Nov 11	2024	Zhuhai, Guangdong	China	38	47	V	Executed	
Feng Wanhai, 26 (冯万海); Jiang Liming, 22 (姜立明)	Nov 18	1995	Zhaodong	China	32	16	F V	Feng was killed by police Jiang committed suicide	
Toi, Mutsuo, 21 (都井睦雄)	May 21	1938	Kamo, Tsuyama	Japan	30	3	FM	Committed suicide	
Thomma, Jakrapanth, 31 (จักรพันธ์ ถมมา)	Feb 8/9	2020	Nakhon Ratchasima	Thailand	29	58	F	Killed by police	
Tian Mingjian, 30 (田明建)	Sep 20	1994	Beijing	China	28	47	F	Killed by soldier	
Unknown	June 3	1938	Ankara	Turkey	26	?	F	Killed by armed citizen	
Unknown	March 25/26	1994	Ta'izz	Yemen	22	?	F	Killed by police	
Uematsu, Satoshi, 26 (植松聖)	July 26	2016	Sagamihara	Japan	19	26	M	Sentenced to death	
Shao Jiangbin, 21 (邵江彬); Geng Xuejie, 20 (耿学杰)	Nov 8–29	1988	Xiangfan	China	19	16	FM	Both killed by soldiers	
Unknown Soldier	April 21	1950	Nainital	India	22	?	M		
Yang Qingpei, 27 (杨清培)	Sep 29	2016	Qujing	China	19	0	M	Sentenced to death	
Huang Guozhen (黄国桢)	March 19	1989	Nafang	China	17	1	MA	Sentenced to death and executed	
Yang Zanyun, 54 (阳赞云)	Sep 12	2018	Mishui	China	15	43	MV	Sentenced to death and executed	
Yuan Daizhong, 41 (袁代中)	Nov 18	2004	Yueyang & Xima	China	15	29	ME	Committed suicide	
Siavash Rahmani-Aqdam, 22 (سیاوش رحمانی-اقدم)	Nov 26/28	1998	Tehran	Iran	14	11	F	Killed by police	

== Europe ==
Only the first 15 entries are shown here. For the entire list see: List of rampage killers in Europe

Perpetrator	Date	Year	Location	Country	Killed	Injured	W	Additional notes	Ref.
Thompson, John, 42	Aug 16	1980	Central London	England	37	23	A	Worst mass murder by a lone perpetrator in Britain history.	
Billon, Louis Michel Riuel, 39	Dec 13	1789	Senlis	France	26	42	F E	Lynched by mob	
Grigore, Eugen, 27	July	1974	Ciurea	Romania	24	≈50	V	Released after serving 27 years in prison, later killed in accident	
Ryan, Michael Robert, 27	Aug 19	1987	Hungerford	England	16	15+	F A	Committed suicide, Also killed his dog	
el Maleck, Abd	June 10/11	1945	Dieppe	France	15	9	FM	Sentenced to death and executed	
Borel, Éric, 16	Sep 23/24	1995	Solliès-Pont & Cuers	France	15	4	FM	Committed suicide	
Leibacher, Friedrich, 57	Sep 27	2001	Zug	Switzerland	14	18	F E	Committed suicide	
Wagner, Ernst August, 38	Sep 4	1913	Degerloch & Mühlhausen/Enz	Germany	14	11	FMA	Found not guilty by reason of insanity Also shot two animals	
Dornier, Christian, 31	July 12	1989	Luxiol	France	14	8	F	Found not guilty by reason of insanity	
Korshunov, Victor Nikolaevich, 19 (Коршунов, Виктор Николаевич); Surovtsev, Yuri Stepanovich, 20 (Суровцев, Юрий Степанович)	Sep 26/27	1968	Kursk	Soviet Union	13	11	F	Korshunov killed by Surovtsev; Surovtsev sentenced to death and executed	
Bogdanović, Ljubiša, 60 (Богдановић, Љубиша)	April 9	2013	Velika Ivanča	Serbia	13	1	F	Committed suicide	
Bird, Derrick, 52	June 2	2010	Copeland, Cumbria	England	12	11	F	Committed suicide	
Konopka, Zdeněk, 54	Aug 8	2020	Bohumín	Czech Republic	11	15	A	Sentenced to life in prison	
Grachov, Grigory Timofeevich, 47 (Грачев, Григорий Тимофеевич)	July 26	1925	Ivankovo	Soviet Union	11	8	F A	Sentenced to 20 years in prison, released after 10	
Gritsuk, Vadim, 41 (Грицук, Вадим)	April 11–27	2000	Omsk	Russia	11	0	M	Sentenced to life imprisonment	

== Oceania and Maritime Southeast Asia ==
Only the first 15 entries are shown here. For the entire list see: List of rampage killers in Oceania and Maritime Southeast Asia

Perpetrator	Date	Year	Location	Country	Killed	Injured	W	Additional notes	Ref.
Butaog, Mangayanon	Sep 9	1985	Sinasa	Philippines	67	0	MP	Committed suicide	
Tarrant, Brenton Harrison, 28	March 15	2019	Christchurch	New Zealand	51	40	F	Sentenced to life imprisonment	
Carlos, Jessie Javier, 42	June 2	2017	Pasay, Metropolitan Manila	Philippines	39	70	FA	The perpetrator committed suicide. The perpetrator killed two of the victims just hours before the main attack.	
Bryant, Martin John, 28	April 28/29	1996	Port Arthur, Tasmania	Australia	35	23	FMA	Sentenced to 35 concurrent life terms plus 1,652 years	
Unknown	?	Before 1905	Siquijor	Philippines	32	?	M	Killed by angry mob	
Wirjo, 42	April 15	1987	Banjarsari & Boyolangu	Indonesia	20	12	M	Committed suicide	
Salazar, Domingo, 42	Oct 11	1956	San Nicolas	Philippines	16	1	M	Sentenced to death Terminated two pregnancies	
Unknown	Dec 13	1873	Ternate	Indonesia	15	4	M	Killed	
Basobas, Florentino	May 9	1977	Quezon, Palawan	Philippines	15	4	M	Shot dead	
Antakin	May 27	1897	Kaningow	Malaysia	15	3	M	Shot dead	
Long, Robert Paul, 38	June 23/28	2000	Childers, Queensland	Australia	15	2+	MA	Sentenced to life imprisonment	
Unknown	Nov.	1935	Gondang	Indonesia	13	3		Sentenced to life imprisonment	
Gray, David Malcolm, 33	13/14 Nov.	1990	Aramoana	New Zealand	13	3	F A	Killed by police	
Rebasien		1856	Napal Malientang	Indonesia	12	7–10		Killed	
Unknown	16 May	1890	Bonthain	Indonesia	12	4+	M	Killed	

== Workplace killings ==
Only the first 15 entries are shown here. For the entire list see: List of rampage killers (workplace killings) and List of rampage killers (workplace violence in the military)

Perpetrator	Date	Year	Location	Country	Killed	Injured	W	Additional notes	Ref.
Yangling, Dong, 19	Dec 13	1993	Fuzhou	China	61	15	A	Set fire to the factory she worked in. Was sentenced to death and executed.	
Burke, Augustus, David, 35	Dec 7	1987	San Luis, Obispo County	United States	42	0	VF	Shot dead five people before intentionally crashing the plane.	
Sanurip, 36	April 15	1996	Timika Airport	Indonesia	16	11	F	Sentenced to death and died in hospital awaiting execution	
Chelakh, Vladislav Valeriovich, 19–20 (Челах, Владислав Валерьевич)	May 28	2012	Arkankergen frontier post	Kazakhstan	15	0	F A	Sentenced to life imprisonment	
Sherrill, Patrick Henry, 44	Aug 20	1986	Edmond, Oklahoma	United States	14	6	F	Committed suicide	
Hasan, Nidal Malik, 39	Nov 5	2009	Fort Hood, Texas	United States	13	32	F	Sentenced to death Terminated a pregnancy	
Deng Guoxiang, 31 (邓国祥)	April 2	1982	Guilin	China	13	3	F	Committed suicide	
Barton, Mark Orrin, 44	July 27–29	1999	Stockbridge & Atlanta, Georgia	United States	12	13	FM	Committed suicide Suspected of killing two people in 1993	
Craddock, DeWayne Antonio, 40	May 31	2019	Virginia Beach, Virginia	United States	12	4	F	Killed by police	
Alexis, Aaron, 34	Sep 16	2013	Washington, D.C.	United States	12	3	F	Killed by police	
Gong Tai-an, 55 (龔泰安)	Feb 16	1999	Fishing vessel Jinqing 12	Taiwan	12	0	F	Sentenced to 20 years in prison Three more died by jumping overboard	
Amizond, Ehsov Todjiddin, 24 (Амизонд, Эхсов Тоджиддин); Rahmonov, Mehrob, 23 (Рахмонов, Мехроб)	Oct 15	2022	Soloti	Russia	11	15	F	Both killed by soldiers	
Leung Ying	August 22	1928	Rockville	United States	11	4	F	Sentenced to death, committed suicide in prison	
Semenikhin, Vitaliy, 19 (Семенихин, Виталий); Muradov, ---, 19 (Мурадов, ---)	July 14	1991	Patrikeyevo	Soviet Union	11	2	F	Semenikhin sentenced to death, later changed to life imprisonment Muradov committed suicide	
Ribeiro, Manuel Antonio Silva, 23	April 25	2016	Praia	Cape Verde	11	0	F	Sentenced to 35 years in prison	

== School massacres ==
Only the first 15 entries are shown here. For the entire list see: List of rampage killers (school massacres)
See also List of school-related attacks

Perpetrator	Date	Year	Location	Country	Killed	Injured	W	Additional notes	Ref.
Kehoe, Andrew Philip, 55	May 18	1927	Bath Township, Michigan	United States	45	57	FME	Committed suicide One victim succumbed to injuries over a year later	
Khamrab, Panya, 34 (ปัญญา คำราบ)	Oct 6	2022	Na Klang district	Thailand	36	10	FMV	Committed suicide	
Cho, Seung-Hui, 23 (조승희)	April 16	2007	Blacksburg, Virginia	United States	32	17	F	Committed suicide	
Lanza, Adam Peter, 20	Dec 14	2012	Newtown, Connecticut	United States	27	2	F	Committed suicide	
Shah Bin Moha, Adli, Muhammad, 16	Sep 14	2017	Kuala Lumpur	Malaysia	23	5	A	Sentenced to detention.	
Ramos, Salvador Rolando, 18	May 24	2022	Uvalde, Texas	United States	21	18	F	Killed by police	
Roslyakov, Vladislav Igorevich, 18 (Росляков, Владислав Игоревич)	Oct 17	2018	Kerch	Russia (de facto); Ukraine (de jure)	20	67	E F	Committed suicide	
Kazantsev, Artyom Igorevich, 34 (Казанцев, Артём Игоревич)	Sep 26	2022	Izhevsk	Russia	18	23	F	Committed suicide	
Kozák, David, 24	Dec 15/21	2023	Klánovice Forest, Hostouň and Prague	Czech Republic	17	25	F	Committed suicide	
Cruz, Nikolas Jacob, 19	Feb 14	2018	Parkland, Florida	United States	17	17	F	Sentenced to life imprisonment	
Hamilton, Thomas Watt, 43	March 13	1996	Dunblane	Scotland	17	15	F	Committed suicide	
Whitman, Charles Joseph, 25	Aug 1	1966	Austin, Texas	United States	16	31	FM	Killed by police Terminated a pregnancy One of the victims died in 2001; attributed to this event	
Steinhäuser, Robert, 19	April 26	2002	Erfurt	Germany	16	1	F	Committed suicide	
Kretschmer, Tim, 17	March 11	2009	Winnenden & Wendlingen	Germany	15	9	F	Committed suicide	
Harris, Eric David, 18; Klebold, Dylan Bennet, 17	April 20	1999	Columbine, Colorado	United States	14	20	F E	Both committed suicide One of the victims died in 2025; attributed to this event	

== Religious, political, or ethnic crimes ==
Only the first 15 entries are shown here. For the entire list see: List of rampage killers (religious, political, or ethnic crimes)

Perpetrator	Date	Year	Location	Country	Killed	Injured	W	Additional notes	Ref.
Mohamed Rashed Daoud Al-Owhali, 19; Jihad Mohammed Ali, 24	Aug 7	1998	Nairobi	Kenya	213	4,000+	F E	Ali committed suicide bombing Al-Owhali sentenced to life without parole	
Lahouaiej-Bouhlel, Mohamed Salmene, 31 (محمد سلمان الحويج بوهلال)	July 14	2016	Nice	France	86	458	V	Killed by police	
Breivik, Anders Behring, 32	July 22	2011	Oslo & Utøya	Norway	75	319	F E	Sentenced to 21 years to life in prison Two more died trying to escape	
Tarrant, Brenton Harrison, 28	March 15	2019	Christchurch	New Zealand	51	40	F	Sentenced to life imprisonment	
Mateen, Omar Mir Seddique, 29	June 12	2016	Orlando, Florida	United States	49	53	F	Killed by police	
Two unknown men	Aug 3	2018	Gardez	Afghanistan	48	70+	F E	One killed by security One committed suicide	
Masharipov, Abdulkadir, 28 (Машарипов, Абдулкадир)	Jan 1	2017	Istanbul	Turkey	39	79	F	Sentenced to life imprisonment	
Yacoubi, Seifeddine Rezgui, 22 (سيف الدين رزقي اليعقوبي)	June 26	2015	Sousse	Tunisia	38	39	F E	Killed by police	
Ibragimov, Ahmed, 43 (Ибрагимов, Ахмед)	Oct 8	1999	Mekenskaya	Ichkeria	35+	20+	F	Killed by angry mob Killed several other people	
Two unknown men	Aug 1	2017	Herat	Afghanistan	33	66	F E	Both committed suicide	
Two unknown men	March 6	2020	Kabul	Afghanistan	32	82	F E	Both killed by police	
Farooq, Ashraf Ali Mohammed; Yasin, Murtuza Hafiz	Sep 24/25	2002	Gandhinagar	India	31	80+	F E	Both killed by police	
Morral Roca, Mateu, 25	May 31/June 2	1906	Madrid	Spain	30	100+	F E	Committed suicide	
Muhammad Zain al-Abidin Abu Uthman	June 22	2025	Damascus	Syria	30	54	F E	Committed suicide	
Two unknown men	Aug 24	2010	Mogadishu	Somalia	30	5+	F E	Both committed suicide	

== Familicides ==
Only the first 15 entries are shown here. For the entire list see: List of rampage killers (familicides in Africa), List of rampage killers (familicides in the Americas), List of rampage killers (familicides in the United States), List of rampage killers (familicides in Asia), List of rampage killers (familicides in China), List of rampage killers (familicides in Europe), and List of rampage killers (familicides in Oceania and Maritime Southeast Asia).

Perpetrator	Date	Year	Location	Country	Killed	Injured	W	Additional notes	Ref.
Ou Yangpu (欧阳普)	Jan 1	1976	Zixing	China	17	0	M	Committed suicide	
Simmons, Ronald Gene, 47	Dec 22–28	1987	Russellville, Arkansas	United States	14	4	MF	Sentenced to death and executed	
Mohammad Zaman, 30	Sep 25	2009	Ghola	Afghanistan	15–16	?	F	Committed suicide	
Warekar, Asnain Anwar, 35	Feb 28	2016	Thane	India	14	1	M	Committed suicide	
Banks, George Emil, 40	Sep 25	1982	Wilkes-Barre, Pennsylvania	United States	13	1	F	Sentenced to death	
Liu Aibing, 34 (刘爱兵)	Dec 12	2009	Yinshanpai	China	13	1	FMA	Sentenced to death and executed	
Ramos de Araujo, Sidnei, 46	Dec 31	2016	Campinas	Brazil	12	3	F	Committed suicide	
Amar Lajdah	Oct 12	2020	Al Bayda	Yemen	12	3	F	Killed by police	
Bahram Jeshanpur, 30	Feb 17	2024	Kerman	Iran	12	3	F	Killed by security forces	
Saeed al-Qashash, 19	June 10	1998	Amman	Jordan	12	0	F	Sentenced to death and executed	
Jia Yingmin, 40 (賈英民)	Oct 6	2000	Kunlong	China	12	0	M	Committed suicide	
Andangan	Oct 21	1921	Cotabato	Philippines	11	0	M	Committed suicide	
Ruppert, James Urban, 40	March 30	1975	Hamilton	United States	11	0	F	Sentenced to eleven consecutive life terms	
Jalal Osman Khoja, 40 (جلال عثمان خوجة)	Dec 26	2000	Jeddah	Saudi Arabia	11	0	F	Committed suicide	
Abdul Emir Khalaf Sabhan	Aug 26	2003	Baghdad	Iraq	11	0	F	Committed suicide	

== Mass murders committed using grenades ==
Name	Date	Year	Location	Country	Killed	Injured	Additional notes	Ref.
Santiago Franch, Salvador, 31	Nov 7	1893	Barcelona	Spain	20–22	27–35	Sentenced to death and executed	
Barde, Reynaldo	April 15	1999	Rapu-Rapu	Philippines	15	70	Sentenced to life imprisonment	
Ismatov, Bobomurad, 49	Feb 6	1994	Kulyab	Tajikistan	12	28	Committed suicide	
Hazaa Sharman	Sep 26	2016	Yarim	Yemen	12	18	Committed suicide	
Sulngarm, Vitoon	May 7	1973	Phitsanulok Province	Thailand	11	12–21	Killed by the explosion	
Chen Anjin (陈安进)	Aug 10	1978	Guangxi	China	9	67	Committed suicide	
Dud Phumla, 22 (ดัด ภูมลา)	May 8	1972	Nakhon Phanom	Thailand	9	13	Sentenced to death and executed	
Unknown soldier	April 15	1990	Kampala	Uganda	9	?	Sentenced to death and executed	
Unknown soldier	Dec 1	1998	Caála	Angola	9	?	Killed by the explosion	
Unknown soldier, 23				Laos	8	12	Killed by the explosion	
Unknown soldier, 35				Laos	7	30	Killed by the explosion	
Shin Myung-sik, 23	May 18	1968	Andong City	South Korea	5–7	43–52	Sentenced to death	
Yeh Jong-nam	June 6	1956	Uijeongbu	South Korea	5	5	Committed suicide	
Bertoli, Gianfranco, 40	May 17	1973	Milan	Italy	4	52	Sentenced to life imprisonment	
Retana, Julio	Dec.	1989	Santa Ana	El Salvador	4	45	Committed suicide	
Unknown, 23	Oct 24	2025	Ovruch	Ukraine	4	12	Committed suicide	
He Dengtian (何登天)	Oct 29	2005	Danzhou	China	4	6	Committed suicide	
Lotero Paredes, Héctor	Aug 17	1969	Apartadó	Colombia	3–4	25–30	Killed by the explosion	

== Other incidents ==
For other incidents in China see: Other incidents

Name	Date	Year	Location	Country	Killed	Injured	W	Additional notes	Ref.
Raymond, James, 30; Gibbons, Hugh, 29; Grate, Clinton, 34	Apr 21	1930	Columbus, Ohio	United States	320–322	230	A	Raymond committed suicide; Gibbons and Grate were sentenced to life imprisonment, Grate committed suicide	
Al-Batouti, Gameel, 59 (جميل البطوطي)	Oct 31	1999	Atlantic Ocean		216	0	V	First Officer; died in the crash of EgyptAir Flight 990, which he deliberately caused	
Kim Dae-han, 56 (김대한)	Feb 18	2003	Daegu	South Korea	192	150	A	Sentenced to life imprisonment for causing the Daegu subway fire	
Unknown	July 6	1944	Hartford	United States	167–169	412-682+	A	Unsolved; Robert Dale Segee confessed to starting the fire; later recanted	
Unknown arsonist	Apr 7	1990	North Sea		158	?	A	Died in the fire; unsolved	
Lubitz, Andreas Günter, 27	March 24	2015	Prads-Haute-Bléone	France	149	0	V	Died in the crash of Germanwings Flight 9525, which he caused	
Mondaca Mella, Francisco Ignacio, 22 Pinto Orellana, Franco Antonio, 31	Feb 2–3	2024	Valparaíso	Chile	138–508+	1,100+	A	Charged with perpetuating the 2024 Chile wildfires; under investigation.	
Unknown	Jan 31	2009	Molo	Kenya	112–113	200	A	Unsolved	
Muñoz Mosquera, Dandeny, 24	Nov 27	1989	Cerro Canoas, Soacha	Colombia	110	0	E	Sentenced to 10 consecutive life sentences for the bombing of Avianca Flight 203	
Tsu Way Ming, 41 (朱卫民)	Dec 19	1997	Palembang	Indonesia	103	0	V	Pilot; Died in the crash of SilkAir Flight 185, which he was suspected of causing	
Aponte, Héctor Escudero, 35 Rivera, Armando Jiménez, 29 López, José Francisco Rivera, 40	Dec 31	1986	San Juan, Puerto Rico	United States	96–98	140	A	Occurred in Puerto Rico, an unincorporated territory of the U.S. Escudero and Rivera were sentenced to 99 years in prison; Jiménez was sentenced to 75. All were released early	
González, Julio, 35	March 25	1990	New York City	United States	87	6	A	Sentenced to 25 years to life imprisonment for causing the Happy Land fire	
Keith, Alexander, 48	Dec 11	1875	Bremerhaven	German Reich	81–83	200	E	Committed suicide	
Unknown	June 15	1972	Pleiku	South Vietnam	81	0	E	Unsolved	
Rzayev, Genghis Yunus-oglu, 32 (Рзаев, Чингис Юнус-оглы)	May 18	1973	Chita Oblast	Soviet Union	80	0	E	Committed suicide	
Le Duc Tan (马宏清)	Sep 15	1974	Phan Rang	South Vietnam	74	0	V	Died in the crash of Air Vietnam Flight 706, which he caused	
Unknown	Oct 12	1967	Mediterranean Sea		66	0	E	Unsolved	
Alekseychik, Sergei Alexandrovich, 27 (Алексейчик, Сергей Александрович)	March 16	2004	Arkhangelsk	Russia	58	175	E	Sentenced to 25 years in prison	
Nasra Yussef Mohammed al-Enezi, 23	Aug 15	2009	Jahra	Kuwait	55–57	80–90	A	Sentenced to death and executed	
Unknown	July 8	1965		Canada	52	0	E	Unsolved	
Huang Gege (黃格格)	Oct 14	2021	Kaohsiung	Taiwan	46	43	A	Sentenced to life imprisonment	
Dzhebirkhanova, Satsita	Aug 24	2004	Rostov Oblast	Russia	46	0	E	Committed suicide	
Doty, Thomas G., 34	May 22	1962	Unionville, Missouri	United States	44	0	E	Committed suicide	
Graham, Jack Gilbert, 23	Nov 1	1955	Denver, Colorado	United States	44	0	E	Sentenced to death and executed for the bombing of United Airlines Flight 629	
Nagayeva, Amanta	Aug 24	2004	Tula Oblast	Russia	44	0	E	Committed suicide	
Younes Khayati, 32 (يونس خياطي)	Aug 21	1994	Agadir	Morocco	43	0	V	Pilot; Died in the crash of Royal Air Maroc Flight 630, which he was suspected of causing	
Zimmer, Andrew, 16	Jun 26	1977	Columbia, Tennessee	United States	42	27	A	Set fire to Maury County Jail	
Epperly, Elnora, 22	Jan 7	1950	Davenport, Iowa	United States	41	24	A	Found mentally unfit to stand trial	
Unknown	Sep 16	1920	Manhattan, New York City	United States	38	700+	E	Unsolved	
Chiasson, Louis, 64	Dec 2	1969	Notre-Dame-du-Lac, Quebec	Canada	38–44	2	A	Sentenced to life imprisonment	
Thompson, John, 42	Aug 16	1980	London	England	37	23	A	Sentenced to life imprisonment	
Aoba, Shinji, 41 (青葉真司)	July 17	2019	Kyoto	Japan	36	33	A	Sentenced to death	
Unknown	April 21	1970		Philippines	36	0	E	Unsolved	
Hansen, Erik Solbakke, 24	Sep 1	1973	Copenhagen	Denmark	35	17	A	Found not guilty by reason of insanity Killed three other people	
Çal, Kadir, 34	April 9	1991	Istanbul	Turkey	34–36	7–10	A	Died in the fire	
Khalid Mahmood, 18 (خالد محمو)	May	2016	Karor Lal Esan	Pakistan	33+	17+	P	Poisoned victims by spiking laddu treats with chlorfenapyr	
Frank, Julian Andrew, 32	Jan 6	1960	Bolivia, North Carolina	United States	33	0	E	Killed by the explosion	
Unknown	June 24	1973	New Orleans, Louisiana	United States	32	15	A	Unsolved	
Unknown	April 22	1980	Saint-Jean-de-Losne	France	32	6–9	A	Unsolved	
Hermino dos Santos Fernandes, 32	Nov 29	2013	Bwabwata National Park	Namibia	32	0	V	Pilot; Died in the crash of LAM Mozambique Airlines Flight 470, which he caused	
Unknown	Jan 26	1972	Srbská Kamenice	Czechoslovakia	27	1	E	Unsolved	
Mahammad Mammadov, 64 (Məmməd Məmmədov)	March 2	2018	Xətai raion	Azerbaijan	26	4	A	Sentenced to life imprisonment	
Kováčová, Eva, 16	Nov 2	1984	Měděnec	Czechoslovakia	26	?	A	Sentenced to five years in prison	
Unknown soldier	Feb 16	1984	Debre Zeyit	Ethiopia	25–28	10–12	E	Died	
Unknown, 61 (accused)	Dec 17	2021	Osaka	Japan	25	3	A	Perished from carbon monoxide poisoning	
Unknown	Oct 10	1971	Naro-Fominsky District	Soviet Union	25	0	E	Unsolved	
Su Ming-cheng, 53 (蘇明成)	July 19	2016	Taoyuan	Taiwan	25	0	A	Perished in the flames	
Katagiri, Seiji, 35 (片桐 清二)	Feb 9	1982	Tokyo	Japan	24	141	V	Pilot; Found not guilty of causing the crash of Japan Airlines Flight 350 by reason of insanity	
Unknown	Aug 12	1939	Harney, Nevada	United States	24	121	V	Unsolved	
Leonard, Peter J., 22	June 30	1974	Port Chester, New York	United States	24	32	A	Sentenced to 15 years in prison	
de la Torre, Humberto Diaz, 19	Sep 4	1982	Los Angeles, California	United States	24	32	A	Sentenced to 25 consecutive life terms Terminated a pregnancy	
Unknown	May 25	1982	Aire-sur-l'Adour	France	24	?	A	Unsolved	
Guay, Albert, 32	Sep 9	1949	Charlevoix, Quebec	Canada	23	0	E	Sentenced to death and executed for the bombing of Canadian Pacific Air Lines Flight 108	
Tatarnikov, Vladimir Georgievich, 29 (Татарников, Владимир Георгиевич)	April 4	1950	Gîsca, Moldavia	Soviet Union	23	?	E	Committed suicide	
Matuska, Szilveszter, 39	Sep 13	1931	Biatorbágy	Hungary	22	120+	E	Sentenced to death Later changed to life imprisonment Later escaped	
Holman, George, 47	March 27	1944	San Francisco, California	United States	22	27	A	Sentenced to 22 concurrent life terms in prison	
McNamara, James B.	Oct 1	1910	Los Angeles, California	United States	21	100+	E	Sentenced to life imprisonment for the Los Angeles Times bombing	
Dorado y Arabaca, Gavino, 48	Sep 2	1962	Manila	Philippines	21	5	A	Sentenced to life imprisonment	
Lin Shan-mu, 38 (林山木)	Sep 15	1970	Fishing vessel "Hsin Hai No. 2"		21	5	P	Sentenced to death	
Unknown	March 20	1970	Seattle, Washington	United States	20	10	A	Unsolved	
Liang Hsin-teng, 51 (梁興登)	May 12	1993	Taipei	Taiwan	20	7	A	Perished in the flames	
Figueroa, Alejandro, 44	Sep 13	1970	Los Angeles, California	United States	19	25	A	Sentenced to life imprisonment	
Unknown	Aug 26	2005	Paris	France	17	0	A	Unsolved	
Ogawa, Kazuhiro, 49 (小川 和弘)	Oct 1	2008	Naniwa-ku	Japan	16	9	A	Sentenced to death	
Tang Mingxiong, 40 (汤铭雄)	Nov 21	1992	Taipei	Taiwan	16	0	A	Sentenced to death and executed	
Unknown	April 17	2013	West, Texas	United States	15	160–200	A	Unsolved	
Xu Ruiqin (徐瑞琴)	Aug 31	2003	Taipei	Taiwan	15	68	A	Perished in the flames	
Won Eon-sik, 35 (원언식)	Oct 4	1992	Wonju	South Korea	15	36	A	Sentenced to death	
Lyttle, Reginald John, 25	Dec 25	1975	Sydney	Australia	15	25	A	Sentenced to life imprisonment	
Karhu, Olavi, 19	July 1	1959	Köyliö	Finland	15	≈20	A	Perished in the flames	
Carver, James, 20	July 4	1984	Beverly, Massachusetts	United States	15	11	A	Sentenced to two consecutive life sentences	
Raecivich, Pero, 45	Feb 1	1942	Boulder, Western Australia	Australia	14	15	E	Committed suicide	
Madera-Flores, Israel, 29	July 5	1982	Waterbury, Connecticut	United States	14	10+	A	Sentenced to life in prison without the possibility of parole	
Thessen, Charles, 35	Sep 12	1966	Anchorage, Alaska	United States	14	?	A	Sentenced to three consecutive 20-year sentences	
Lin Ji-hung, 69 (林基雄)	Oct 23	2012	Tainan	Taiwan	13	61	A	Sentenced to death Died while awaiting execution	
Lassiter, Robert Lee, 26	Dec 11	1965	Chicago, Illinois	United States	13	22	A	Sentenced to 100 to 150 years in prison	
Aco Martinović, 45	January 1	2025	Cetinje	Montenegro	13	3	F	Committed Suicide	
de Oliveira, Raul	March 29	1978	Criciúma	Brazil	13	1	E	Sentenced to 251 years in prison Also killed his three accomplices in the explosion	
dos Santos, Damião Soares, 50	Oct 5	2017	Janaúba	Brazil	12	38	A	Perished in the flames One of the injured died in 2018; attributed to this event	
Moore, Valerie, 47	Oct 31	2006	Reno, Nevada	United States	12	31	A	Sentenced to 12 consecutive life prison terms without parole	
Beard, Roy Jennings, 57	July 7	1975	Portland, Oregon	United States	12	26	A	Found mentally unfit to stand trial	
Zhu Baoguang, 41 (朱宝光)	Jan 10	1994	Hong Kong	Hong Kong	12	1	A	Sentenced to 20 years in prison Terminated a pregnancy	
Unknown	Aug 9	1894	Lincoln, Nebraska	United States	11	?	V	Unsolved	
Essia Boularès, 41	Feb 5	2019	Paris	France	10	96	A	Sentenced to 25 years in prison	
Unknown	Nov 26	1978	Greece, New York	United States	10	34	A	Unsolved	
Volynsky, Peter Kuzmich, 31 (Волынский, Пётр Кузьмич)	June 14	1971	Krasnodar	Soviet Union	10	20–90	E	Found not guilty by reason of insanity	
Lauwers, David, 35	Feb 26	1994	London	England	10	13	A	Sentenced to life imprisonment One more died trying to escape	
Andersson, Rickard, 35	Feb 4	2025	Campus Risbergska, Örebro	Sweden	10	12	F	Committed Suicide	
Borilović, Vučko , 33	Aug 12	2022	Cetinje	Montenegro	10	6	F	Killed by police	
Raag, Johannes	Sep 21	1950	S/S Energi		10	0–4	E	Eight years in prison	
Freeman, Gordon Howard, 49	Dec 23	1989	Toronto	Canada	10	?	A	Sentenced to 10 years in prison	
Marchukov, Alexey, 27 (Марчуков, Алексей)	March 6	2002	Saint Petersburg	Russia	9	9	A	Sentenced to life imprisonment 2 more died by jumping out of a window	
Li Guohui, 49 (李國輝)	Nov 22	2017	New Taipei City	Taiwan	9	2	A	Sentenced to death	
Zhang Bing, 44 (子張炳)	March 8	1975	Hong Kong	Hong Kong	9	0	A	Sentenced to death Later changed to life imprisonment	
Warren, Roger Wallace, 49	Sep 18	1992	Yellowknife, Northwest Territories	Canada	9	?	E	Sentenced to life imprisonment for the Giant Mine bombing Granted full parole in 2017	
Cline, Philip Bruce, 23	Feb 10	1981	Las Vegas, Nevada	United States	8	350+	A	Sentenced to life in prison without parole	
Unknown	March 5	1982	Lowell, Massachusetts	United States	8	5	A	Unsolved	
Komarov, Alexander, 37 (Комаров, Александр)	Oct 19	2019	Rostov	Russia	8	0	A	Sentenced to life imprisonment	
Ponkratov, Alexander Alekseevich, 28 (Понкратов, Александр Алексеевич)	March 26	2020	Yekaterinburg	Russia	8	0	A	Sentenced to life imprisonment	
Castillo, Manuel	Jan.	1952		Peru	8	?	E	Committed suicide	
Fielding, Richard, 20	March 6	1999	Chingford	England	7	1	A	Sentenced to be detained for an indefinite period	
Unknown	Oct 10	1933	Chesterton, Indiana	United States	7	0	E	Unsolved	
Unknown	Sep 29–30	1982	Chicago, Illinois	United States	7	0	P	Unsolved	
Gerdt, Petri Erkki Tapio, 19	Oct 11	2002	Vantaa	Finland	6	166	E	Killed by the explosion	
Chunmo, 53 (천모)	June 9	2022	Daegu	South Korea	6	49	A	Perished in the flames	
Konopka, Zdeněk, 54	Aug 8	2020	Bohumín	Czech Republic	6	15	A	Sentenced to life imprisonment 5 more died by jumping out of a window	
Maruyama Hirobumi, 38 (丸山博文)	Aug 19	1980	Shinjuku	Japan	6	14	A	Sentenced to life imprisonment	
Brown, Gregory Allan	Sep 17	1989	Sydney	Australia	6	13	A	Sentenced to 18 years in prison	
Murray, Bruce J.	Dec 10	1968	Paterson, New Jersey	United States	6	10	A	Sentenced to life imprisonment	
Blackwell, Anthony Lee, 20	July 17	1975	Baltimore, Maryland	United States	6	8	A	Sentenced to life in prison	
do Nascimento Rosa, Edmundo	Dec 18	1949	Araçatuba	Brazil	6	7–8	E	Escaped; committed suicide days later	
Unknown	April 30	1966	Brockton, Massachusetts	United States	6	4	A	Unsolved	
Lucas, Tonya Renee, 29	July 7	1992	Baltimore, Maryland	United States	6	3	A	Sentenced to six consecutive life terms	
Franco Ribeiro, Armindo, 23	Jan 13	1996	Porto Alegre	Brazil	6	2	A	Perished in the flames	
Rusanen, Tenho Olavi	Sep 18	1981	Helsinki	Finland	6	1	A	Confessed and later recanted. Sentenced to three years and ten months in prison.	
Lory, Alan Wayne	Feb 4	1995	Hamilton	New Zealand	6	1	A	Sentenced to life imprisonment Paroled in 2009	
Unknown	April 6	1984	Baltimore, Maryland	United States	6	0	A	Unsolved	
Fowler, Rickie Lee	Oct 21 – Nov 2	2003	San Bernardino Mountains, California	United States	6	?	A	Sentenced to death for causing the Old Fire	
Orgeron, Paul Harold, 49	Sep 15	1959	Houston, Texas	United States	5	19	E	Killed by the explosion	
Unknown	Sep 18 – Oct 9	2001	Washington, D.C. West Palm Beach, Florida; New York City	United States	5	17	P	Unsolved	
Unknown	Oct 4	1989	New Delhi	India	5	13	E	Suspected to be a land dispute attack	
Paris, Richard James, 28	Jan 7	1967	Las Vegas, Nevada	United States	5	12	E	Died in the explosion	
Oyler, Raymond Lee	Oct 26 – Nov 1	2006	Cabazon, California	United States	5	12	A	Sentenced to death for causing the Esperanza Fire	
Delgado, José Diego Alvarez, 34	May 17	1997	Cajicá	Colombia	5	9–15	P	Committed suicide	
Unknown	Feb 24	1999	Lynn, Massachusetts	United States	5	7	A	Unsolved	
Kaverin, Sergei, 44 (Каверин, Сергей)	Oct 29	1999	Odesa	Ukraine	5	5	A	Perished in the flames	
Hayashi, Masumi, 37 (林真須美)	July 25	1998	Wakayama	Japan	4	64	P	Sentenced to death	
Ivanyutina, Tamara Antonovna, 45	March 17–18	1987	Kiev	Soviet Union	4	9	P	Sentenced to death and executed Killed five other people from 1976	
Tyufekchiev, Naum, 50 (Тюфекчиев, Наум)	Feb 14	1915	Sofia	Kingdom of Bulgaria	4	8	E	Assassinated in 1916	
Unknown	April	1937	Eaux Vives	Switzerland	4	7	E	Died in the explosion	
Reardon, Charles, 49	Feb 2	1973	Miami Beach, Florida	United States	3	139	A	Found incompetent to be tried due to mental illness	
Brigham, Thomas Bernard Clark, 65	Sep 3	1984	Montreal, Quebec	Canada	3	70	E	Sentenced to life imprisonment	
Unknown, 15	Oct 23–27	1978	Los Angeles, California	United States	3	50	A	Imprisoned until his 21st birthday	
Rose, Jason Allen, 20	Oct 7	2005	Lawrence, Kansas	United States	3	17	A	Sentenced to 10 years in prison	

== Annotation ==
The W-column gives a basic description of the weapons used in the murders

F – Firearms and other ranged weapons, especially rifles and handguns, but also bows and crossbows, grenade launchers, flamethrowers, or slingshots
M – Melee weapons, like knives, swords, spears, machetes, axes, clubs, rods, stones, or bare hands
O – Any other weapons, such as bombs, hand grenades, Molotov cocktails, poison and poisonous gas, as well as vehicle and arson attacks

V – indicates that a vehicle was the only other weapon used
A – indicates that an arson attack was the only other weapon used
E – indicates that explosives of any sort were the only other weapon used
P – indicates that an anaesthetising or deadly substance of any kind was the only other weapon used (includes poisonous gas)

== See also ==
- List of postal killings
- Mass murder
- School shooting
- Spree killer

== Bibliography ==
- Chester, Graham: Berserk! – Motiveless Random Massacres; Michael O'Mara Books, 1993. ISBN 978-1-85479-177-1
- O'Brien, Bill: Killing for Pleasure; Blake Publishing, 2001. ISBN 978-1-903402-58-0
- Pantziarka, Pan: Lone Wolf – True Stories of Spree Killers; Virgin Publishing, 2002. ISBN 978-0-7535-0617-2
- Time-Life Staff: Mass Murderers; Time-Life Books, 1992. ISBN 978-0-7835-0004-1
