= The Wedding Party =

The Wedding Party may refer to:

- "The Wedding Party" (Fawlty Towers), the third episode in the first season of the TV series Fawlty Towers, aired in 1975
- The Wedding Party (1969 film), an American comedy film created by three directors
- The Wedding Party (2016 film), a Nigerian romantic comedy film
- The Wedding Party (2010 film), an Australian comedy film starring Josh Lawson and Isabel Lucas
- The Wedding Party (2017 film), an American comedy film starring Blake Lee

== See also ==
- Wedding party massacre (disambiguation)
