= Wedding party massacre =

Wedding party massacre may refer to:

- 17 August 2019 Kabul bombing, a suicide bombing at a wedding hall in Kabul, Afghanistan
- Haska Meyna wedding party airstrike, 47 killed, mostly women and children, in a U.S. airstrike in Afghanistan
- Mukaradeeb wedding party massacre, a shooting and bombing attack by American troops in Iraq
- Nadahan wedding bombing, a suicide bomb attack in Afghanistan
- Shajian Village wedding bombing, suicide bombing in China which killed 39
- Uruzgan wedding bombing, a 2002 airstrike in Afghanistan by the U.S. Air Force
- Wech Baghtu wedding party airstrike, a shooting and bombing attack by coalition troops in Afghanistan
