= Aeroflot Flight 109 =

1973 plane crash caused by hijacker with bomb

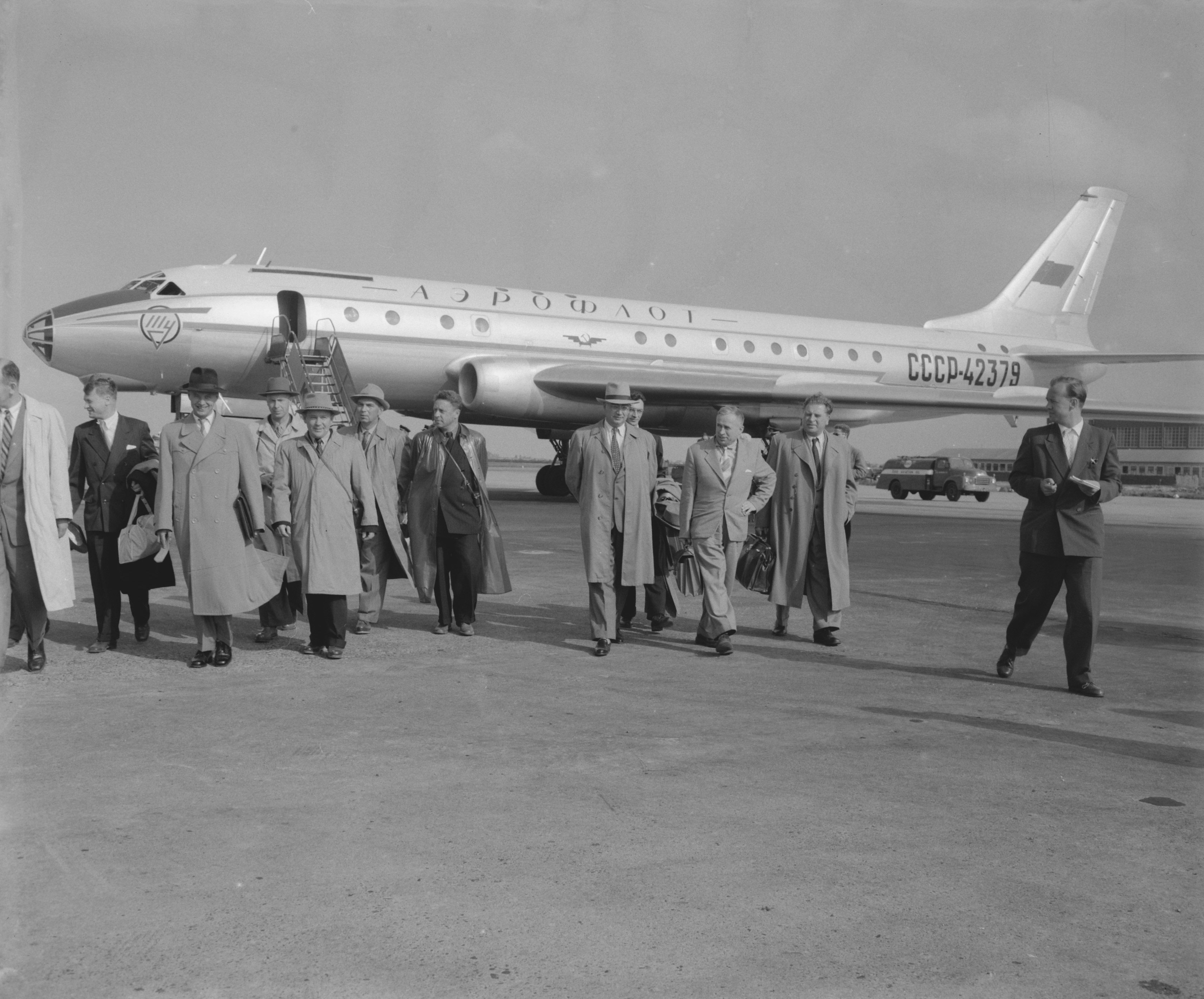
- CCCP-42379, the aircraft involved in the accident, in 1958

Accident
- Date: 18 May 1973
- Summary: Hijacking/bombing
- Site: 97 km (60 mi) west of Chita Airport

Aircraft
- Aircraft type: Tupolev Tu-104A
- Operator: Aeroflot, East Siberia Civil Aviation Directorate
- Registration: CCCP-42379
- Flight origin: Domodedovo Airport, Moscow
- 1st stopover: Chelyabinsk Airport, Chelyabinsk
- 2nd stopover: Severny Airport, Novosibirsk
- Last stopover: Irkutsk Airport, Irkutsk
- Destination: Kadala Airport, Chita
- Occupants: 81
- Passengers: 72
- Crew: 9
- Fatalities: 81
- Survivors: 0

Aeroflot Flight 109 was a scheduled domestic passenger flight from Moscow to Chita with stopovers in Chelyabinsk, Novosibirsk, and Irkutsk. On the final leg of the route on 18 May 1973 a terrorist hijacked the aircraft, demanding to be flown to China; the terrorist's bomb detonated in flight after he was shot by the air marshal. The aircraft broke-up at altitude, killing all 81 on board.

== Aircraft ==
The aircraft involved in the accident was a Tupolev Tu-104A registered CCCP-42379 to Aeroflot. The cabin layout originally had enough seats for 70 passengers, but the seating configuration was changed to accommodate 85 passengers. The Tupolev Tu-104 took its first flight on 17 May 1958. At the time of the accident, the aircraft sustained 19,329 flight hours and 8,841 pressurization cycles.

== Crew ==
72 passengers were aboard the flight, including four children. Nine crew members were aboard the flight. The cockpit crew consisted of:

- Captain Nikolai Obodyansky
- Co-pilot Yuri Ponomarev
- Navigator Vladislav Baryshnikov
- Flight engineer Georgy Kuzenkov
- Radio operator Nikolai Yefimtsev

The cabin crew consisted of three flight attendants and an air marshal.

== Synopsis ==
The flight carried out the Moscow-Irkutsk part of the route without incident. On 18 May at 03:02 Moscow time the flight departed from Irkutsk Airport, proceeding en route to Chita at an altitude of 9,000 metres (30,000 ft). At 03:22 flight 109 entered the zone of Chita air traffic control, and at 03:32 the air traffic controller permitted the flight to descend to 3,900 feet (1,200 m). Shortly thereafter at 03:36 the flight radio transmitted an indication of danger three times; the crew then informed air traffic control that a passenger in the cabin insisted the flight change course. The controller confirmed receipt of the information. At 03:36:30 the crew reported they would maintain a holding pattern at 6,500 metres (21,300 ft); at 03:36:45 the dispatcher asked the crew for their current altitude, to which they reported they would be increasing to 6,600 metres (21,700 ft).

At 03:38 a coded transmission indicating the flight was in danger was sent, but was interrupted after the ninth dash. An onboard security officer, 21-year-old Vladimir Yezhikov, shot the hijacker twice. The bomb then detonated.The dispatcher informed the flight of their location relative to the airport, but the flight did not respond; the spot on the radar screen where the flight was appeared like a blur before it disappeared from the radar completely.

At 4:55, the crew of a Mi-8 helicopter discovered the remains of the aircraft 97 kilometres (60 mi; 52 nmi) directly west of Chita Airport, stretching across land area over 10 kilometres (6.2 mi; 5.4 nmi) wide. None of the 81 people aboard the aircraft survived.

== Conclusions ==
Five eyewitnesses reported seeing and hearing an explosion in the air at between 09:35 and 09:45 local time (03:35 to 03:45 Moscow time); according to the commission responsible for the investigation, the aircraft broke up mid-air into several sections consistent with a sharp sudden change in pressure.

Forensic investigation revealed that the explosion was caused by passenger Chingis Yunusogly Rzayev, born in Irkutsk, Russia in 1941. When he tried to infiltrate the cockpit the policeman Vladimir Yezhikov shot him in the back; the bullet hit the area of the 8th intercostal space before it penetrated the heart. As Rzayev laid dying, he managed to activate the bomb he had with him, consisting of 5.5–6 kilograms (12–13 lb) of TNT.

The final report stated "The cause of the airplane crash, which broke apart in mid-air killing all passengers and crew, was the explosion of a bomb by a terrorist who tried to force the crew to change the course of the aircraft."

== See also ==
- United Airlines Flight 93
- Air Vietnam Flight 706
- Pacific Air Lines Flight 773
- Pan Am Flight 103
