= 2001 Shijiazhuang bombings =

Terrorist attacks in Hebei, China

Shijiazhuang bombings
- Apartments in Shijiazhuang after the explosions
- Location: Shijiazhuang, Hebei, China
- Date: March 16, 2001
- Attack type: Bombings; mass murder; stabbing; domestic terrorism
- Weapons: Knife; Improvised explosive devices
- Deaths: 109 (1 by stabbing, 108 by bombings)
- Injuries: 38
- Perpetrator: Jin Ruchao
- Motive: Revenge against ex-wife, ex-mother-in-law and lover

The Shijiazhuang bombings (Chinese: 靳如超爆炸案 or 石家庄"3·16"特大爆炸案), also known as Jin Ruchao bombings and March 16 bombings, were a series of bomb blasts that took place on March 16, 2001, in Shijiazhuang, the capital of Hebei province in North China. A total of 108 people were killed, and 38 others injured when within a short period of time several bombs exploded near four apartment buildings.

The perpetrator, 40-year old Jin Ruchao, was motivated by hatred for his ex-wife, ex-mother-in-law and a lover; he had previously threatened to blow up their buildings.

== Sequence of events ==
Locations of targeted dorms
1. Number 3 Cotton Mill
2. Shijiazhuang Number 1 Construction
3. Hardware Company
4. Minjin Street hutong

The explosives were made from ammonium nitrate. Jin had paid 950 RMB ($115) to Wang Yushun (王玉顺) and Hao Fengqin (郝凤琴), owners of an illegal explosives workshop near Shijiazhuang.

According to Jin Ruchao's confession, he flew to Tianjin after stabbing his girlfriend to death in her home in Maguan County, Yunnan, and took a bus to the suburbs of Shijiazhuang, where he hid the fuse and detonators. He then purchased dynamite from Wang Yushun, from whom he also bought small quantities of dynamite from the previous year for experiments, in Luquan District. From March 12 to 14, Jin bought dynamite from Wang 3 times. On March 15, Jin rented a pick-up truck to transport his bombs to his targets, which were in bags labeled as "chicken feed". For some reason, the truck driver refused to take the bags further while midway through the journey and Jin was forced to store them in an abandoned building in a village outside of the city. At 8 pm that night, he first rented a three-wheeler to transport bombs to the Hardware Company dorm (五金公司宿舍) on 13 Dianda Street and 12th Hutong on Minjin Street (民进街12号院), as well as the Shijiazhuang Number 1 Construction (市建一宿舍) and Number 3 Cotton Mill (棉三宿舍) dorms. After a quick nap, he delivered more bombs to the latter two dorms with the help of another three-wheeler and a taxi. He then took multiple taxis to detonate the bombs one by one.

The first bomb went off at 4:16 am and blew a hole in the walls of the 15 Cotton Mill dorm, which housed Jin's step mother at the time. Shortly after, the 16 Cotton Mill dorm, where Jin lived and had a bitter argument with a neighbor regarding splitting rooms, was completely leveled by the second bomb. The third bomb went off at 4:30 am, destroying a unit of the Shijiazhuang Construction company dorm, which housed Jin's ex. At 4:45 am, a unit of the Hardware Company dorm, which housed Jin's ex, was demolished by a bomb. The final explosion came at 5:01 am, at the 12th Hutong on Minjin Street, which Jin had inherited from his parents but had lost money selling the property. The bomb had only made a crater on the ground nearby.

== Perpetrators ==
Jin Ruchao

Jin Ruchao (Chinese: 靳如超; pinyin: Jìn Rúchāo; December 7, 1960 – April 29, 2001) was blamed and arrested for planning and carrying out the bombings. Jin became deaf at age eight due to an ear infection, and he since became silent and a loner. He was also subjected to constant bullying at school. He dropped out during middle school due to financial issues and worked in a textile factory among a plethora of other jobs. He had kept a diary, where he wrote that he was suspicious towards his family members, particularly his ex-wife, on whom he blamed his rape conviction in 1988. Jin also blamed traffic accidents that killed his mother and injured his father in 1994 on his ex-wife and her family.

Following widespread public fear, the Chinese government published a lengthy description of the bombings. Jin was arrested in Beihai, Guangxi, following a manhunt and a posted 100,000 RMB ($12,000) reward just 11 days after the bombing, which had been doubled from an initial 50,000 RMB.

Jin pleaded guilty and was sentenced to death. Also convicted were the three who supplied Jin: Wang Yushun and Hao Fengqin were sentenced to death for supplying him with ammonium nitrate, while a fourth man received a suspended death sentence for selling him 50 detonators and fuses. On April 29, 2001, Jin Ruchao, Wang Yushun, and Hao Fengqin were executed for their roles in the bombings.

== Aftermath ==
The attack was the biggest mass murder in China in decades. China scholar Andrew Scobell described it as perhaps the worst terrorist act in the history of the People's Republic of China. There were conspiracy theories that Jin was a scapegoat with no knowledge of explosives, and that the blast could have been orchestrated by disaffected ex-employees who had been laid off in China's restructuring.

== See also ==
- 1999 Russian apartment bombings
- Fanglin Village primary school explosion
- Mafang Village explosion
- Qitaihe bombing
