= 2018 Mishui vehicle attack =

Mass murder incident in Mishui, Henan, China

- Mishui (China)
- Location: Mishui, Hunan Province, China
- Date: 12 September 2018; 7:35 p.m.
- Target: Pedestrians
- Attack type: Mass murder, vehicle-ramming attack, mass stabbing
- Weapons: Land Rover SUV, shovel, knife
- Deaths: 15
- Injuries: 43
- Perpetrator: Yang Zanyun
- Motive: Revenge on society

On 12 September 2018, a man deliberately drove his SUV into crowds on a square in Mishui near Hengyang in Hunan Province, China. The attack resulted in the deaths of 15 people and injuries to 43 others. The attacker, Yang Zanyun, was sentenced to death and executed.

== Attack ==
The attack happened at about 7:35 p.m. when a Land Rover SUV was driven onto a square in Mishui and deliberately struck people. When the vehicle came to a stop, the suspect got out and continued his attack with a shovel and a knife.

== Suspect and investigation ==
The suspect was identified as 54-year-old Yang Zanyun, who was living off interest from loans. He had a long criminal record that included previous convictions for selling drugs, theft and attacking people.

The government said Yang wanted to take "revenge on society". Three months after the attack, on December 12, Yang was sentenced to death and deprived of his political rights for the remainder of his life. The sentence was approved by the Supreme People's Court and he was executed on January 29, 2019.

== See also ==
- List of rampage killers (vehicular homicide)
- List of rampage killers in China
- 2024 Zhuhai car attack
