= 2024 Ju County attack =

Mass murder in Shandong, China

Ju County attack
- Dozens of armed police on standby, outside of Zhaike Village in Ju County
- Native name: 莒县惨案
- Location: 35.738°N 118.835°E; Zhaike Village, Ju County, Shandong, China
- Date: 10 February 2024; Midnight – morning (UTC+8)
- Target: Villagers; medical workers; police
- Attack type: Mass shooting; mass stabbing; mass murder
- Weapons: Unknown firearm (Note: Some sources state that the perpetrator was a member of the Special Police, and used a fully automatic rifle, while others state they used a self-modified staple or nail gun.); knife
- Deaths: 21+
- Injuries: 20+
- Perpetrator: Unknown – likely 3 to 6 assailants
- Motive: Revenge in personal disputes

On 10 February 2024, the first day of the Chinese New Year, a man reportedly attacked multiple people in Zhaike Village, a settlement in Rizhao's Ju County in Shandong, China, with a knife and some type of firearm. Also known as the Ju County massacre (Chinese: 莒县惨案) or Zhaike Village massacre, the incident left at least 21 people dead, including one doctor and two police officers, and many more injured. Details of the bloodshed remain unclear and unconfirmed due to strict government censorship. Some reports indicated that additional attackers were involved.

== Attack ==
Late into 9 February and/or in the early hours of 10 February, as Chinese New Year's Eve was ending, a middle-aged man entered Zhaike Village (Chinese: 宅科村), in Luohe Township (Chinese: 洛河镇), Ju County of Rizhao. He stabbed two villagers with a knife to death outside of a building in the village. A family of seven was then killed, leaving no one alive. The timing is said to coincide the overnight firework celebration which covered the sounds of gun shooting. Overseas Chinese artist Li Ying, who is active on Twitter as "Teacher Li Is Not Your Teacher", posted updates regarding the attack quoting sources and people familiar with the events.

By midnight of 10 February, bystanders dialed 120 for first aid. A crowd of possibly over a hundred civilians and medical personnel gathered around the scene. Doctors and nurses had arrived earlier than the police. A doctor, aged around 27, attempted to save the injured, but was ambushed and shot dead by the attacker who had been hiding behind cover, using a self-converted nail gun that was capable of shooting steel bullets. Some sources claimed the firearm was an automatic weapon stolen from the police armory. According to Newtalk News, the overnight massacre took 11 lives.

The attacker returned in the morning, killing ten more in the village. The onslaught was not known until relatives arrived for the new year visit in the afternoon, only to discover dead bodies.

Photos circulated on social media appeared to show dozens of armed police, equipped with guns, entering and sealing off the village, possibly in the afternoon. A large-scale manhunt reportedly began after the attack. Only relatives could enter the village and were also followed by officials.

== Casualties ==
A day after the apparent attack, Ifeng, the online outlet of Chinese media Phoenix Television reported that "a man suspected of injuring multiple villagers" was under officials' control. The report cited "rumors on the internet" located the apparent attack at Zhaike village of Luohe township. On 12 February, Ifeng published another news report on the massacre, which put the death toll at "over 10" and that "one suspect is under control". Both articles were later deleted.

Li said "over 10" were killed and "over 10" were injured, who were hospitalized in the nearby city of Linyi. Another source quoted by Liberty Times of Taiwan claimed 18 died. Oriental Daily News of Hong Kong said 21 died and more than 20 injured.

Amongst the casualties, 11 were members of five families in the village, including the family of seven. Li, on the other hand, said only two families were involved, which had personal disputes with the attacker back in the school days. One of the deaths was the main perpetrator's teacher.

Li described the assailant as "resolute" in killing as "nearly all are mortal wounds". While there were reported shootings, most of the villagers, including kids, died of stabbing. Other than the killed doctor, a nurse was also sent to the intensive care unit. Two police were also killed.

== Perpetrator(s) ==
There is contradicting information on whether it was a lone-wolf attack. Li said most of the sources claimed 3 to 6 people were involved, and the main perpetrator was arrested as he did not flee the crime scene. At least two were still being hunted as of 13 February.

The main perpetrator, reportedly in his thirties, was raised and allegedly abused by his uncle. He had mild physical disabilities after a car accident. He was once jailed, and this attack was carried out with cellmates, "one of which had mental disorder".

Other unconfirmed details said the gunman was a retired armed police, or a sacked member of the special police unit.

=== Motives ===
Different speculations emerged over the motives of the attack, but it is apparently targeted at people he had disputes with.

According to some villagers, the assailant worked in the village after his daughter-in-law left following his car accident. After the boss owed him salary, the attacker was sent to prison for two or three years by a relative of the boss who is a government official. The attacker decided to revenge and therefore killed the whole family of the boss. However, some others claimed the jail term was much higher at 17 years.

Another speculation was that the attacker was abused by the teacher in school days, and hence killing the teacher and all the family members, in addition to other people who had disputes with him.

Social media users suspected the man was depressed as his arranged fiancée suddenly left, thereby triggering the attack. Varied motives said the teacher, instead of the boss, sued the attacker.

== Aftermath ==
Shortly after the incident, terms such as "Zhaike incident" and "Ju County murder case" briefly began trending on social media sites, before disappearing. All information regarding the attack had later been censored and deleted from the social media, and was also not mentioned by any Chinese media except Phoenix Television and NetEase, with those reports having been deleted as well. No official responses from the government were released as well. Keywords hinting at the events (such as "the attack"), possibly suppressed by the government, remained on the internet. Wu added the police threatened the villagers not to reveal anything regarding the attack.

The political commission of Rizhao's Communist Party branch reportedly released "Emergency Notice regarding Establishment of Daily Report System on Risks and Hidden Danger of Social Conflict" on 11 February, calling for serious investigations on 16 groups of people that might provoke extreme cases, including the unemployed, unguarded teens, mental disorder patients, those failed in life, marriage or investments, or prone to violence.

Posts denouncing injustice against medical workers can be found on social media. Li said this is likely due to unconfirmed plans of the hospital to consider the perpetrator with major mental disorder, so as to play down the seriousness but, at the same time, shift the responsibilities to the medical workers for negligence.

This incident remains poorly reported by Chinese media, with much of the details unconfirmed by any official source.

== See also ==
- List of massacres in China
- Tian Mingjian incident – A similar incident in 1994
