= 2017 Xuzhou kindergarten bombing =

Suicide attack in Feng County, Jiangsu, China

2017 Fengxian bombing
- Location: Feng County, Jiangsu, China
- Date: 15 June 2017; 9 years ago
- Attack type: Suicide bombing, school bombing, school attack
- Deaths: 8 (including the bomber)
- Injuries: 65
- Perpetrator: Xu Taoran

On 15 June 2017, a bombing at a kindergarten in Feng County, Jiangsu, east China, killed at least eight people and injured 65 others. The perpetrator, 22-year-old Xu Taoran, died in the blast. Subsequent investigation revealed that Xu was mentally ill and obsessed with death and destruction. The blast occurred at the entrance of the kindergarten, while children were leaving school. Two people died on the spot, and five succumbed to injuries at the hospital. Nine remained in critical condition in the aftermath. Due to the shattering bomb parts, over 60 people were injured and needed medical attention.

The Fengxian county government stated that the casualties did not include any of the kindergarten's children or teachers, as class had not yet been dismissed.

== Motives ==
The suicide bomber responsible was identified as 22-year-old Xu Taoran, who had "vegetative nervous function disturbances," a disorder that can cause heart and breathing problems. Prior to the attack, he dropped out of school and went to work and lived near the kindergarten. After the attack, investigators found material to make a homemade explosive device and, written on a wall near the school, a "manifesto-style rant." It has been suggested that the attack may have been targeted at mothers. Sociologists say "the attacks on schools and young children are a result of the strains of society undergoing rapid change."

== Victims ==
After the explosion, about fifty-nine adults and children survived with injuries. However, eight victims, including the bomber, died in the explosion. Authorities did not specify if there were any children included in the fatalities.

== Investigation ==
Chinese investigators used physical evidence and DNA found at the scene to determine the identity of the suspect, which pointed to Xu Taoran, 22, a university dropout who had written violent screeds against parents and children. Taoran had antisocial tendencies and had a debilitating autonomous nervous system disorder that forced him to take a leave of absence from his school, authorities said. Due to China's gutted mental health care program, those who are poor and can't afford any care, such as Xu, are left to grapple with frustration. The police discovered the materials used to make the explosives in his apartment, along with words such as "'die,' 'death' and 'destroy'" written on the walls, assumingly pointed towards children and families.

== Related events ==
From 2010 to 2012, China saw at least nine attacks on elementary students, which together killed at least 25 people and wounded more than 100. Many of these attacks seem related to each other regarding how the schools security system were lacking and thorough background checks were not completed on the school personnel. Some of these attacks include:

- In Weihai, on 9 May 2017, a school bus driver set fire to his bus in a tunnel after losing overtime pay, killing 11 children, a teacher and himself.
- In Hanzhong, May 2010, a 48-year-old man charged into a kindergarten and killed 7 children and 2 adults with a cleaver. After committing this act, the attacker went home and committed suicide.
- In Nanping, a worker who had a history of mental illness stabbed 8 young children to death and wounded five other children outside an elementary school in eastern China

The events allowed school boards to make new decisions and new policies to keep children safe in schools to avoid such tragedies.

== See also ==
- Fanglin Village primary school explosion
