= Mafang Village explosion =

2001 mass murder in Shaanxi, China

- Location: Mafang Village, Nanniwan, Baota District, Yan'an, Shaanxi, China
- Date: 16 July 2001; 25 years ago 3:25 a.m. (China Standard Time)
- Attack type: Bombing, mass murder
- Deaths: 89+
- Injuries: 98+
- Perpetrator: Ma Hongqing

On 16 July 2001, an explosion occurred in Mafang Village, Shaanxi, China. At least 89 people died and 98 others were injured in the blast after a villager intentionally ignited explosives. The incident was contemporaneously called the "7.16 bombing" by Chinese media.

== Background ==
At the time of the disaster, explosives were commonly used in China for mining and to clear fields for agriculture, making them easily accessible to anyone. Two similar attacks occurred four months before the explosion, in Jiangxi (42 dead) and Hebei (108 dead).

== Explosion ==
On 16 July 2001, at 3:25 a.m., Ma Hongqing (Chinese: 马宏清; 19 September 1950 – 23 September 2001), an illegal explosives manufacturer from Mafang Village, attempted to steal another manufacturer's 30+ tons of ammonium nitrate explosives but failed to do so, after which he lit a fuse equipped with a detonator and fled the scene. The subsequent explosion decimated the sleeping village, damaging 311 houses and killing at least 89 people and injuring 98 others. The crater the blast left behind was the size of a basketball court.

== Investigation ==
Suspicion originally fell on the explosives manufacturer Ma Hongqing had targeted, Ma Shiping, who had illegally stored his explosives in the building after his factory was shut down. His wife and four children had been killed in the explosion. However, after two weeks of investigation, it was determined that Ma Hongqing was responsible. Ma had "long-running" conflicts with his neighbors, including Ma Shiping, and was in debt. Ma Hongqing's own explosives factory, stone quarry, and chicken farm had all recently shut down. Due to his poor reputation and debts, no one in the village would associate with him, and he began threatening retaliation.

== Aftermath ==
Ma Hongqing at trial

On 3 August 2001, Ma was arrested after evidence mounted against him. He had originally fled to Wuhai, Inner Mongolia, after the explosion and intended on committing suicide by self-immolation, but decided to return home two days before his arrest to accept his fate.

Ma confessed and was sentenced to death on 3 September or the morning of 23 September 2001, and was executed by shooting.

== See also ==
- List of ammonium nitrate incidents and disasters
