= Pomona Hotel fire =

1975 arson attack in Portland, Oregon

Coordinates: 45°31′24.6″N 122°40′21.8″W

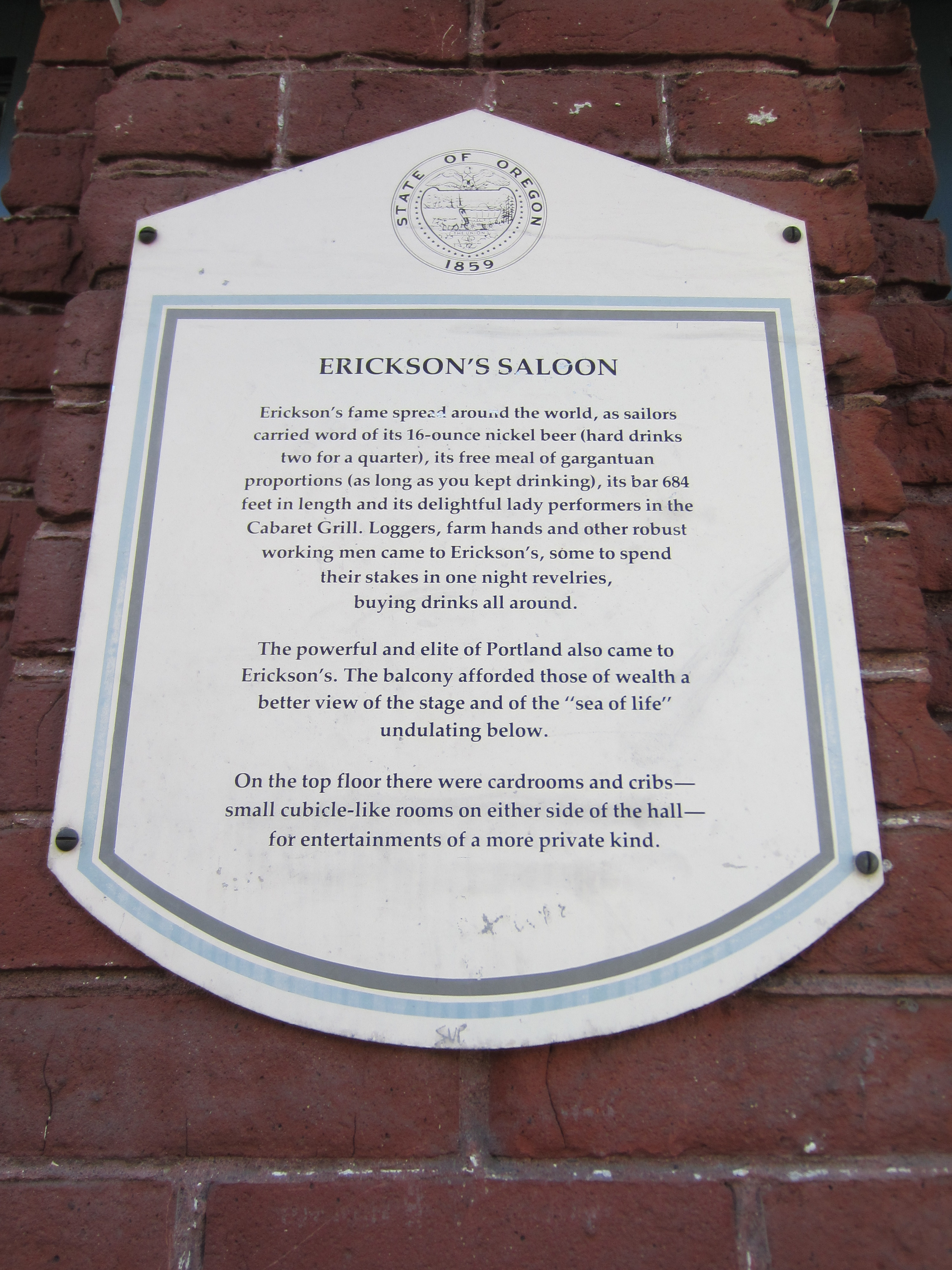
Plaque on the historic Erickson Saloon Building, in which the Pomona Hotel existed

The Pomona Hotel fire occurred on July 7, 1975, when Roy Jennings Beard, a 57-year-old transient in northwest Portland, Oregon, United States, set the building ablaze in an act of arson on the second floor. A total of eight people died during the initial fire, and an additional four succumbed to injuries in the subsequent weeks and months, making it the deadliest fire in the city's history. A total of 26 others were injured in the fire.

== Fire ==
At approximately 11 p.m. on July 7, 1975, a fire broke out inside the Pomona Hotel (located within the former Erickson Saloon Building) on Burnside Street in northwest Portland, Oregon, in what was at the time considered "one of the toughest, largest skid rows on the West Coast”. At this time, the hotel catered mainly to the impoverished, with rooms for 80 cents per night. Firefighters arrived after being notified of the fire shortly after it started, and trapped men were visible from the hotel's third floor screaming for help. One firefighter recalled men "hanging by their fingertips" from third floor ledges of the building. The fire, which charred the majority of the 100-room hotel's hallways and doors, was put out, and the majority of the bodies recovered were discovered in the halls, where residents and guests had collapsed while trying to escape.

Firefighters estimated the blaze reached a maximum of 1,000 °F (538 °C) on the building's third floor, and it caused approximately $135,000 in damage. It was determined by firefighters that the fire had begun on the hotel's second floor, where gasoline had been poured to ignite the blaze, and that the building did not have proper sprinkler systems installed.

=== Victims ===
A total of eight decedents were recovered from the hotel after the fire, all of whom perished from asphyxiation via carbon monoxide poisoning; an additional 26 individuals sustained significant injuries (eight of whom were listed as being in critical condition per a July 9 report). Of these 26 individuals, a further four would succumb to their injuries in the subsequent weeks and months, making the total death count 12.

Publicly identified victims:

- Narcisse Bierle, 57
- José Hernandez, 45
- Virgil Howard, 47
- Carl Hunsacker, 62
- William Hysmith, 46
- Jim Jiminez, 57
- Claude Maple, 69
- Keith Millsap, 60
- Robert Platero, 50

== Arrest ==
=== John Joseph Newvine ===
In the early morning hours of July 8, law enforcement arrested 61-year-old John Joseph Newvine, a skid row resident, on eight charges of arson and murder, respectively. Law enforcement was led to Newvine after an attendant from a nearby gas station informed them that a suspicious man had purchased two gallons of gasoline shortly before the fire broke out. An empty gasoline canister was discovered lying in an intersection adjacent to the hotel. Newvine was described as an "unemployed loner" who had been through local "alcohol detoxication program[s]" a total of 22 times. At the time of the fire, he was a resident of another hotel, the Home Hotel, also located on skid row. However, on July 10, the charges against Newvine were dropped after the gas station attendant retracted his identification, claiming he misidentified Newvine.

=== Roy Jennings Beard ===
Roy Jennings Beard, 57, was subsequently arrested and charged in the fire. On July 15, Beard was sent to Oregon State Hospital for psychiatric evaluation, after investigators deduced that he was not "in a position to appreciate what he has been charged with." After evaluation, a tentative trial date of September 15, 1975, was set for Jennings, at that time for 11 counts of murder.

== See also ==
- List of hotel fires in the United States
