= Fanglin Village primary school explosion =

2001 mass murder in Jiangxi, China

- Fanglin Village (China)
- Location: 28°06′21.6″N 114°09′19.4″E; Fanglin Village, Wanzai County, Jiangxi, China
- Date: 6 March 2001; 25 years ago 11 a.m. (China Standard Time)
- Attack type: Suicide bombing, school bombing (alleged), mass murder
- Deaths: 42 (including the perpetrator)
- Injuries: 27
- Perpetrator: Li Chuicai (alleged)

The Fanglin Village primary school explosion occurred on 6 March 2001, in Jiangxi, China. Li Chuicai, a 32-year-old villager, was alleged to have ignited explosives in a classroom, killing 42 people.

The explosion came ten days before the Shijiazhuang bombings, which killed 108.

== Background ==
Fanglin Village is located in the mountainous Wanzai County and was home to several factories that produce fireworks and firecrackers.

== Suicide bombing ==
According to local officials, on 6 March 2001, around 11 a.m., Li entered Fanglin Village's primary school carrying two sacks filled with 132 pounds (60 kg) of potassium nitrate. Upon entering a classroom, teacher Deng Chengbao asked him to leave and not disrupt the class. After Li refused, Deng continued teaching. Li then lit one of the sacks and threw it into a row of desks. Deng shouted for students to run; the explosion leveled four classrooms, killing Li and 41 others.

== Perpetrator ==
Li Chuicai (Chinese: 李垂才; 25 September 1968 – 6 March 2001) came from a poor family with a history of mental illness and began working at a local firecracker factory at a young age. He had a mixed reputation in his village; while he was known for his odd behavior, he was also successful with women and regarded as an honest man and hard worker.

In 1998, Li had a daughter with his girlfriend, Ouyang. Before he could propose to her, she married another man and took their daughter with them. The following year, Li intended to marry another woman from a neighboring village named Tang. Because he did not have enough money for a betrothal gift, her family objected to the marriage. Li became withdrawn and went to the family's home every few days to make noise.

Li's mental health worsened after his several relationship failures. In his diary, he attributed all of his problems to money, as well as stating his desire and plans for revenge.

== Controversy ==
After the blast, some families of victims accused the government of not adequately investigating the explosion and accused them of falsely pinning it on a madman. The school was known to have forced students to assemble firecrackers in 1998.

Authorities stated that autopsies showed Li was at the center of the explosion, and testimonies from teachers and students corroborated that Li was the perpetrator.

== See also ==
- 2001 Shijiazhuang bombings
- 2017 Xuzhou kindergarten bombing
- List of school attacks in China
- Mafang Village explosion
- Shiguan kindergarten attack
