= Yangquan theatre bombing =

1981 murder-suicide at a theatre in Yangquan, Shanxi, China

Yangquan cinema bombing
- Location: Yangquan, Shanxi, China
- Date: 22 July 1981; 8 p.m.
- Target: Film theatre
- Attack type: Suicide bombing, mass murder
- Weapon: Ammonium nitrate
- Deaths: 32 (including the perpetrator)
- Injuries: 127 (44 seriously)
- Perpetrator: Gao Haiping

The Yangquan theatre bombing was a suicide bombing that occurred at a theatre in Yangquan, Shanxi, China, on 22 July 1981, when 24-year-old Gao Haiping detonated a self-made explosive device that killed 32 people, including himself, and wounded 127 others.

== Bombing ==
On 22 July 1981, Gao Haiping, together with a girl who had dumped him previously, wanted to visit a film screening at the San Kuang Club (三矿俱乐部) in Yangquan, an institution with a total of 2056 seats run by the Bureau of Mining Affairs (矿务局). There he intended to kill them both with a bomb made of about 3 kg of ammonium nitrate with an electric detonator contained in a metal box.

When the woman did not show up, Gao entered the theatre alone and took his place in seat 25 in the second row. At about 8 p.m., he put the bomb on his lap and detonated it manually, killing himself and 31 other people and wounding another 127, 44 of whom were sent to hospitals. Furthermore, the explosion caused a partial collapse of the theatre's roof and shattered the glass doors of the building.

Within 15 minutes, one thousand police officers arrived at the scene to maintain order and start an investigation into the crime. Gao was soon identified by a former classmate, who was also attending the screening, and blood tests, as well as the identification of the remains of his clothes by his mother, confirmed him as the culprit of the explosion. Also, a suicide note and letters to his parents were found in a drawer in his home, as well as explosives wrapped in paper.

== Perpetrator ==
Gao Haiping was an only child. He worked as a miner and was described as a loner who was pessimistic and dissatisfied with his life. The day of the bombing, he stated that he wanted to go home and warned a neighbor that he should not go to the theater if he wanted to avoid trouble.
