= 2016 Yema village stabbings =

Mass stabbing in Yunnan, China

- Location: Yema village, Huize County, Qujing, Yunnan, China
- Date: 28 September 2016; 10 years ago
- Attack type: Mass stabbing, parricide, spree killing, pedicide
- Weapon: Pickaxe
- Deaths: 19 (including perpetrator's mother and father)
- Injuries: 0
- Perpetrator: Yang Qingpei
- Motive: Argument over money; attempt to cover up crime

On 28 September 2016, a mass stabbing occurred in Yema, a rural village in Huize County, Yunnan, China. The perpetrator, 27-year-old Yang Qingpei, murdered his parents after they refused to lend him money to help pay off gambling debts, then killed 17 neighbors across six houses in an attempt to cover up the crime. Yang was sentenced to death in July 2017.

== Background ==
Yema is located in the mountainous region of southwestern Yunnan and cut off from the surrounding Daibu Township due to its high 8,000 feet (2,400 m) elevation. Most of the village's inhabitants are elderly. The killings took place in the Baifengwan hamlet, which is remote within the village itself.

According to his wife, Yang had been living in Kunming with her and their children. He had begun acting coldly after his parents sent him a reduced allowance of ¥500 instead of ¥1,000, which prompted his return to Yema. A friend stated that Yang was a compulsive gambler and heavily in debt since his move to Kunming.

== Victims ==
The victims, aged 3 to 72, belonged to six families, including Yang's own. Eleven were male and eight were female, also including four children. While only his parents were confirmed to be related to Yang, The New York Times noted that ten of the victims had the same surname, three of whom also shared the same generation name as Yang. Neighbours from Daibu Township also told reporters that "most of the dead" were relatives to him.

== Aftermath ==
Police were informed of the killings the morning on 29 September, at 7:50 a.m. Yang was arrested the same day in Kunming, 33 hours after the killings took place. Yang went on trial on 18 July 2017, where he apologized to the relatives of the victims and pled guilty to all charges. On 28 July, Yang was sentenced to death.

== See also ==
- List of mass stabbings by death toll
