= Shajian Village wedding bombing =

2000 mass murder in China

- Location: Shajian Village, Xiatuanbao Township, Shuocheng District, Shuozhou, Shanxi, China
- Date: 29 March 2000; 26 years ago ~10:15 a.m. (China Standard Time)
- Attack type: Suicide bombing
- Deaths: 39 (including the perpetrator)
- Injuries: 50+
- Perpetrator: Liu Zhanjin

On 29 March 2000, 34-year-old Liu Zhanjin committed a suicide bombing at a wedding ceremony in Shajian Village, Shuozhou, Shanxi, China, which killed 39 people and injured over 50 others.

== Background ==
Liu Zhanjin (Chinese: 刘占金; c. 1965 – 29 March 2000), nicknamed "Wuyang" (Chinese: 五羊), was an explosives expert from Shajian Village, employed as a blaster at Shajian's coal mine. He had a wife, one son, and two daughters.

On 11 March 1999, Liu's wife and 6-year-old son disappeared. Liu told others in the village that she had run away with another man, which she had done before. According to locals, he became "full of hatred" around this time and was quoted as saying: "I will show my power, and it will be more powerful than the fire in Daxing'anling." In the weeks leading up to the bombing, Liu practiced detonating explosives in the nearby wilderness.

== Bombing ==
On the morning of 29 March 2000, Liu instructed his two daughters to go to their grandmother's house after school and to not attend the upcoming village wedding.

At about 10:15 a.m., over 200 people were celebrating on both sides of Shajian's main street. Liu walked into the street, hauling a flatbed cart with 40–50 kilograms of explosives concealed underneath corn, which he then detonated; 25 people were killed in the blast, and 14 later died while hospitalized—over 50 others had non-fatal injuries. Windows of buildings were shattered as far as 100 metres away, and a large crater was left behind in the street.

== Investigation ==
After the explosion, Liu's brother reported him missing. When police entered his home, they found a box and note that read: "Open the box and the truth will be revealed." Inside the box was a lengthy suicide note, which instructed police to look inside his toilet. In the toilet were the remains of Liu's wife and son.
