= Air Vietnam Flight 706 =

1974 aircraft hijacking

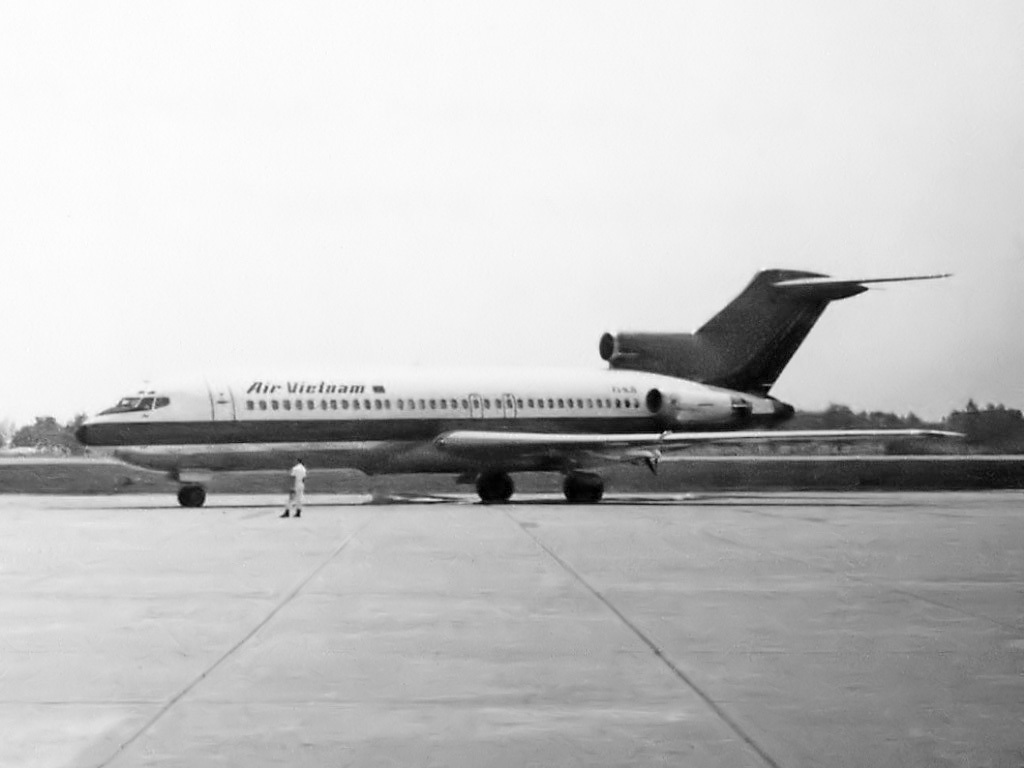
- XV-NJC, the aircraft involved, pictured in February 1974

Hijacking
- Date: September 15, 1974
- Summary: Hijacking
- Site: Phan Rang Air Base, Phan Rang, South Vietnam; 11°38′N 108°57′E

Aircraft
- Aircraft type: Boeing 727-121C
- Operator: Air Vietnam
- IATA flight No.: VN706
- ICAO flight No.: AVN706
- Call sign: AIR VIETNAM 706
- Registration: XV-NJC
- Flight origin: Da Nang Airport, Da Nang, South Vietnam
- Destination: Tan Son Nhat International Airport, Saigon, South Vietnam
- Occupants: 75
- Passengers: 67
- Crew: 8
- Fatalities: 75
- Survivors: 0

Air Vietnam Flight 706 was a Boeing 727 that crashed on September 15, 1974, after three hijackers detonated hand grenades as it was approaching Phan Rang Air Base in South Vietnam for an emergency landing. All 67 passengers and 8 crew members aboard the aircraft were killed in the crash.

== Hijacking and crash ==
Le Duc Tan, a ranger in the South Vietnamese army who had recently been demoted from captain to lieutenant for the theft of two cars in Da Nang, smooth-talked his way past security checkpoints. After taking off from Da Nang International Airport (DAD/VVDN) in South Vietnam on a regularly scheduled flight to Saigon's Tan Son Nhat International Airport (SGN/VVTS), the flight was hijacked by Tan and two accomplices, holding two grenades. They demanded to be flown to Hanoi in North Vietnam. The pilot told the hijackers that he had to land for fuel at Phan Rang Air Base.

Shortly before the plane exploded, the pilot radioed that the hijacker was pulling the pins on two grenades. The aircraft overshot the base leg and initiated a left turn, during which it lost control. Shortly after that, it plunged to the ground from an altitude of 1,000 feet (300 m), killing all 75 people aboard.

== See also ==
- Malaysian Airline System Flight 653
