= Qitaihe bombing =

1979 mass murder in Heilongjiang, China

- Location: Qitaihe, Heilongjiang, China
- Date: 1 December 1979
- Attack type: Bombing, mass murder
- Weapon: Bomb
- Deaths: 86
- Injuries: 222
- Perpetrators: Xu Fenghao; Xu Fengde

The Qitaihe bombing was a mass murder that occurred on 1 December 1979 in Qitaihe, Heilongjiang, China. During a film screening attended by 900 people at the Fuqiang Brigade Club (富强大队俱乐部) in Dongfeng commune (东风公社), two brothers, Xu Fenghao (徐凤浩) and Xu Fengde (徐凤德), detonated a bomb that killed 86 people and wounded 222 others, 35 of them seriously. During four nights, the two had buried five bombs consisting of a total of 180 kg of stolen explosives, 15 kg of gasoline and diesel, and 30 detonators at the club. The case was solved 55 days later. Both were sentenced to death.
