= List of mass stabbing incidents (before 2010) =

This is a list of mass stabbings that took place before 2010. It includes incidents in which there were at least three casualties (killed or injured).

== 1890s ==
=== Triabunna, Tasmania, Australia (1898) ===
On March 1, 1898, Catherine Glover and her six of her eight children were missing from their home in Triabunna, Tasmania, Australia. A search happened and a day later, a search dog found the bodies of the Glover children covered underneath a blanket. It was revealed the children’s throats were cut with a razor. Catherine was still missing, leading to many believing she would kill her other two children. Her body was soon found in the Spring Bay, where she had committed suicide by drowning. An inquest and a jury verdict ruled Catherine murdered her children before killing herself. A motive for the act, was linked to her mental state as she had been depressed before the murders occurred.

== 1900s ==
=== Corsicana, Texas, U.S (1909) ===
On June 5, 1909, in Corsicana, Texas, U.S, in the Green residence, two tenants living there heard a disturbance in the room of 29-year-old Mrs. J.M Green, where they discovered her with a razor in her hand and the bodies of her three children; 12-year-old Virgie, 7-year-old Paul, and 2-year-old Paul with their throats slashed.The tenants ran put of the home to call for help, and when they came back, Mrs. J.M Green had committed suicide. Investigations later revealed domestic troubles motivated Mrs. Green to kill her children in an act of altruistic murder-suicide after allegations she made against her husband, that he had committed incest on Virgie.

== 1920s ==
=== Greenwich, Connecticut, U.S (1922) ===
In Greenwich, Connecticut, U.S, 31-year-old Johanna Bacher, distressed over her husband divorcing her and wanting to take full custody of their children, Johanna took a carving knife and went to the rooms of her three children; 4-year-old Margaret, 3-year-old Johanna, and 1-year-old Henry Jr. and slashed their throats, before slashing her throat, committing suicide. It is considered one of the worst murder cases in Greenwich’s history.

=== Magnum, Oklahoma, U.S (1924) ===
On September 27, 1924, In Magnum, Oklahoma, U.S, J.A. Melton, returned home to find the bodies of his wife and four children, 11-year-old Romaine, 6-year-old Robert, 4-year-old Dewey, and 18-month-old Estell with their throats slashed. A razor was found in Mrs. Melton’s hand and an inquest determined she had slashed her children’s throats before committing suicide. A theory was she has suffered from mental illness which was worsened by the birth of Estell.

=== Kershaw & Columbia, South Carolina, U.S (1927) ===
On September 25, 1927, in Kershaw, South Carolina, two neighbors wanting store owner, Glenn Gregory, to open his shop, found him laying in his bed critically injured from many blows from an axe. He was soon rushed to the hospital. As neighbors tried to find out who attacked him, they received notice from Glenn’s father-in-law about his wife, Mamie. She had arrived at her father’s home with her two children, 5-year-old Glenn Jr. and 2-year-old Phillip. She immediately slashed the throats of her sons with a razor, before slashing her throat, committing suicide. From an inquest, Mamie had attacked her husband before going to her father’s home. Glenn later succumbed to his wounds in the hospital on September 30.

=== Lebanon, Kentucky, U.S (1929) ===
On May 23, 1929, in Lebanon, Kentucky, U.S, two youths discovered a woman groaning on the ground in Ryder cemetery. She was found with her throat slashed. She pointed to a nearby field, where the youths found the bodies of deceased three children with their throats slashes. The woman and children were identified as 38-year-old Mamie Shey Shoaf, and her three children 11-year-old Catherine, 7-year-old Ina, and 2-year-old Thomas. Mamie was taken to the hospital, but died a few hours later from her wounds. An inquest was held, where it was determined Mamie had slashed her children’s throats with a razor due to becoming distressed of domestic and financial issues she was facing, before committing suicide. It is considered one of the most infamous crimes in Lebanon’s history.

== 1930s ==
=== RMS Empress of Canada (1931) ===
On 5 June 1931, 42-year-old plantation laborer Graciano Bilas killed two people and injured 29 others at several locations aboard the Empress of Canada in the Pacific Ocean, off the eastern coast of Japan. Bilas, a Filipino migrant worker in Hawaii, was tried in Hong Kong the same month, charged only with the killing of one victim, Chinese crew member Chan Yue. He claimed that Japanese ship staff had planned to kill him, with doctors ascribing a manic depressive psychosis to Bilas based on other behaviour displayed after the attack. In July, Bilas was found insane and committed to a psychiatric hospital.

== 1940s ==
=== Sanford, North Carolina, U.S (1945) ===
On August 2, 1945, in Sanford, North Carolina, 48-year-old Mattie Copeland slashed the throat of her sister, 43-year-old Maude Kelly, with a straight razor in the home of Copeland’s daughter. One of Copeland’s daughters living in the residence heard the commotion and went to investigate, stumbling upon the murder scene. Mattie then chased her daughter into the front yard, where the daughter escaped. Mattie turned her attention to her own yard where her two grandchildren, 4-year-old Randolph and 2-year-old Donna Hunter, and slashed their throats, before going into another yard and committing suicide. It was one of the worst crimes the city had seen in decades.

== 1950s ==
=== Nainital, India (1950) ===
On 21 April 1950, a drunk Gurkha soldier stabbed 22 guests at a wedding in Nainital, India, all of them apparently fatally. The man, who was armed with a machete, was enraged by a low caste money lender marrying a girl of the higher social standing Brahmin caste. All of the victims were members of the Harijan caste.

=== Kampala, Uganda (1950) ===
On 28 July 1950, 55-year-old Lazaro Obwara killed twelve people at the Mulago Government African Hospital in Kampala, Uganda. The attack took place in the early morning hours at the pediatric ward, where Obwara was visiting his terminally ill son. For unknown reasons, Obwara ran down one side of the ward to stab other child patients, who were sleeping in their beds. Medical staff and visiting mothers evacuated most of the children during the attack. Eight children and one of the mothers died at the scene, while another child died of their injuries during the day. Two children were injured, dying a day after the attack.

Obwara was arrested at the scene. On 29 July, before the deaths of the two injured victims, he was charged with ten counts of murder in front of a magistrates' court.

=== Skåne County, Sweden (1952) ===
On 21 August 1952, 25-year-old Tore Hedin killed nine people around Skåne County, Sweden, four of whom were killed with axe blows. He first killed his parents with an axe and set their house on fire. He then went to a retirement home, where his girlfriend Ulla Östberg worked, and killed her and the matron with an axe. He set the retirement home on fire as well, killing five of its residents. He then committed suicide by drowning in a nearby lake. Hedin had previously killed a friend of his in 1951, similarly burning the home to erase evidence.

=== Mahagi, Belgian Congo & Mwanza, Tanganyika (1954/1955 & 1957) ===
In either 1954 or 1955, Ugandan national Adrogo killed 22 family members near Mahagi, Belgian Congo with a machete. After spending several years as a fugitive under the false identity of William Unek, he committed another mass murder in the Malampaka area, Tanganyika, killing 36 people, six of whom were murdered with an axe. He was killed during a manhunt after police set fire to a hut he was hiding in and fatally shot him as he fled.

== 1960s ==
=== San Carlos, Chile (1960) ===
On 20 August 1960, 21-year-old farmer Jorge Valenzuela Torres murdered his romantic partner and five of her children with a scythe at their home in Coihueco, Chile, before fleeing. He was arrested the following month and executed in 1963.

=== Topeka, Kansas, U.S (1962) ===
On December 1, 1962, 30-year-old William Fitzgibbons Jr. arriving home from work found the bodies of his wife, 27-year-old Anne Fitzgibbons and their four children, 4-year-old Billie, 3-year-old Tommie, 2-year-old Jeffery, and 1-year-old Kelly, with their throats slashed. Investigators later determined, Anne was the one who committed the murders, by using a 14-inch butcher knife, to cut her children's throat before killing herself. Police found a motive in notes she left, with it appearing she suffered from depression. The murders of the children were the first recorded quadruple murder in the history of Topeka.

=== Chicago, Illinois, US (1966) ===
On the night of 13–14 July 1966, Richard Speck killed eight student nurses after breaking into their bedroom dormitory in Chicago, United States, holding them captive and stabbing or strangling each of them throughout the night. A ninth student nurse escaped by hiding under a bed. Speck was identified after a suicide attempt, when he was taken to the hospital and a resident physician recognized Speck's tattoo from a description in the news.

== 1970s ==
=== Monterey County, California, U.S (1977) ===
On August 11, police went to the residence to perform a welfare check, and inside the residence found the bodies of four women, deceased from multiple stab wounds. They were 66-year-old Josephine Smith, 28-year-old Suzanne Harris, Harris’ 6-year-old daughter, Rachel, and a niece, 15-year-old Renee Ferguson.

== 1980s ==
=== Kowloon, Hong Kong (1982) ===
On 3 June 1982, 28-year-old Lee Chi-hang killed six people in two knife attacks in Kowloon, Hong Kong. He first killed his mother and sister, also injuring two neighbours as he fled. Lee then entered Anne Anne Kindergarten and stabbed 34 children, killing four of them, also injuring several bystanders, before he was arrested by police. Lee, previously diagnosed with schizophrenia, was found to be insane and was placed in a mental institution.

After the stabbing, security measures at nursery schools were upgraded, and it was made compulsory for discharged patients of mental institutions to regularly attend psychiatric out-patient clinics.

=== Chantada, Spain (1989) ===
On 8 March 1989, Paulino Fernández stabbed seven people to death and injured at least six others in Chantada, Spain, before killing himself.

=== Nafang, China (1989) ===
On the afternoon of 19 March 1989, Huang Guozhen killed 16 or 17 people and injured two others in Nafang, a village in Guangxi, China. After becoming intoxicated, he set fire to his house and drove to his brother's house, killing his brother and his wife with a firewood knife. Guozhen then proceeded to travel to the local market and began to kill individuals at random, including children and the elderly. Sometime before the rampage killing, Huang became embroiled in a dispute with his brother, Huang Xiangbang.

Huang Guozhen was eventually subdued by bystanders Huang Guoqin and local CCP party secretary Zhou Youbang. He was arrested and tried ten days later in Qinzhou. He was sentenced to death in front of a crowd of 10,000 people and was quickly executed on the same day.

=== Springfield, New Jersey, U.S (1989) ===
On Memorial Day of 1989, a depressed Yale Student, Rolando Marcelo, armed with a 10-inch-butcher knife, would go on a stabbing spree, killing his mother and brother. A family friend showed up and questioned him about the scene, before Rolando chased the friend in the neighborhood where they ended up at a backyard barbecue. Rolando would stab him to death, during which two neighbors got involved and Rolando would stabbed one to death and critically injured the other. He would initially face the death penalty, but was soon found not guilty by reason of insanity, and was diagnosed with schizoaffective disorder. He would be committed to a mental hospital.

== 1990s ==
=== Auckland, New Zealand (1990) ===
On 16 July 1990, 52-year-old mental hospital outpatient Pauline Janet Williamson attacked the courtyard of the Jewish Kadimah College's primary school in Central Auckland, New Zealand, stabbing four children. As the pupils played in the school courtyard before school was due to start, Williamson ran onto the school courtyard, where 6 year olds Nicholas and Sam Henderson and Simon Clark, and 8-year-old Damon Bree were playing. She then produced a 4-inch, stay-sharp vegetable knife and began screaming antisemitic slogans and a Jewish surname (not one shared by any of the victims), before wildly lacerating these four children. Williamson was eventually disarmed by a male teacher, Mr Yurovitch. The children, aged 6 to 8, were hospitalised immediately afterwards; all survived, after receiving intensive surgery. They were identified by police as 6-year-old twins Nicholas and Samuel Henderson; Simon Clark, 6, and Damon Bree, 8. This apparently random act of antisemitic violence in New Zealand, a country known to be tolerant of its Jewish community, shocked many. However, it followed the desecration of several Jewish graves in Dunedin by two months, which itself was a copycat of an attack on Jewish graves in Carpentras, in the South of France.

=== Porterville, California, U.S (1991) ===
On May 21, 1991, 45-year-old Sypheuang Souvannasing, a former mental patient, went on a stabbing spree in Porterville, California. Armed with a hunting knife, his spree happened in a neighborhood where he killed 57-year-old Jean Elmore, before setting her home on fire. He then went into another home, and killed 79-year-old Milo Jenkins and injured his wife Louise. A neighbor, 48-year-old Rudy Pino came to fend off Souvannasing, but was fatally stabbed by him. Police arrived on the scene and ordered Souvannasing to drop the knife. He lunged at them with it, before being shot and killed by police. The stabbings were the first mass murder in the history of Porterville.

=== Birmingham, United Kingdom (1994) ===
On 8 December 1994, 30-year-old David Cedric Morgan slashed fifteen people in a department store in Birmingham, England. Morgan, previously diagnosed with schizophrenia, hypomania and depressive psychosis, had previously complained of "evil thoughts" about attacking women and arrested before for attacking women in the street, each resulting in conditional discharges. Three people were seriously injured and needed surgeries. In addition of those stabbed, five people were treated for shock. Morgan was arrested by police after being confronted by an armed civilian.

Morgan was later determined by a psychologist to be "vulnerable and isolated", but that he apparently suffered from no mental illnesses. Morgan was sentenced to life imprisonment in February 1996. In 2002, he was transferred from the Broadmoor Hospital to a medium security unit where he would be allowed on escorted shopping trips as part of rehabilitation. In 2006, Morgan, then 43 years old, was released into the community to go shopping. At the time he was being treated at the Stafford's St George's Hospital.

=== Naples, Florida, US (1995) ===
In the early hours of 15 November 1995, 26-year old Brandy Bain Jennings and 19-year old Charles Jason Graves killed three former co-workers at a Cracker Barrel in Naples, Florida, United States. Jennings & Graves robbed the restaurant and slit the throats of 18-year old Jason Wiggins, 38-year old Dorothy Siddle, and 27-year old Vicki Smith. Both suspects were caught a year later in Las Vegas and were sentenced to death.

=== Chenggu County, China (1998) ===
On 23 June 1998, 39-year-old farmer Yang Mingxin attacked fellow villagers with an axe in Chenggu County, Shaanxi, China. Nine people were killed and three were wounded. Yang, who was described as reticent, had refused to sell ten stolen geese for another farmer named Guo Baoning, and when the owner of the geese later caught him, Guo suspected Yang had informed on him. After a heated argument between the two, during which Guo threatened to kill Yang's family, Yang armed himself with an axe and hacked twelve villagers between 4 months and 71 years of age. Unable to locate Guo he eventually tried to commit suicide by drinking insecticide and hanging himself, but was rescued and taken to a hospital.

=== Krông Pắk District, Vietnam (1998) ===
On 8 August 1998, 35-year-old rice farmer Dương Văn Môn killed twelve people and injured six in Krông Pắk District, Vietnam. Dương, a member of the Nùng minority, had attacked guests at his mother's funeral after repeated conflicts with other villagers regarding her burial, further compounded by prior mental illness and financial troubles related to the arrangement of a traditional funeral feast.

On the third day of the festivities, when his guests began to complain that there was not enough to drink and eat, Dương armed himself with two machete-like knives and began to attack his relatives and neighbours. He first stabbed an elderly woman preparing food in his house, as well as a child, and eventually began chasing people throughout the village. The dead included seven children, with his wife among the injured. Eleven died at the scene while one of the wounded died in hospital. Afterwards he tried to commit suicide by swallowing insecticide, but was forced to vomit it when he was captured by villagers 4 1/2 hours later. He was then arrested by police and brought to a hospital. Môn was sentenced to death for the murders in November 1998.

=== Shimonoseki, Japan (1999) ===
On 29 September 1999, 35-year-old Yasuaki Uwabe drove a car into Shimonoseki Station and then stabbed passers-by at random, killing five people and injuring 10 others, before being arrested at the scene. Uwabe was sentenced to death in 2002 and executed in 2012.

== 2000s ==
=== Ikeda, Japan (2001) ===
On 8 June 2001, 37-year-old ex-convict Mamoru Takuma killed students and injured fifteen others at an elementary school in Ikeda, Japan. He worked as a janitor at the school, with the injured being thirteen students and two teachers. He was executed in 2004.

=== Manchester, United Kingdom (2003) ===
On 14 January 2003, 31-year-old Kamel Bourgass stabbed four police officers in Manchester, England, killing anti-terrorism detective Stephen Oake. Bourgass had been caught up in an apartment search during an immigration operation and falsely believed police had come to arrest him for his involvement in a terror plot. He received life imprisonment.

=== Midlothian, Illinois, US (2004) ===
On 4 June 2004, 26-year-old Brett Carlson stabbed six people at a strip mall in Midlothian, United States, killing one-year-old Ashley Hurt. In 2007, Carlson was sentenced to 50 years in prison.

=== Ruzhou, China (2004) ===
On 26 November 2004, 21-year-old Yan Yanming (Chinese: 闫彦明) entered a dormitory at the Ruzhou Number Two High School in Ruzhou, China on 26 November 2004, with a knife and attacked twelve boys, killing nine of them. After the attack, Yan ran away from the school, but was arrested hours later after he survived a suicide attempt because his mother had reported his location to the Ruzhou police. After trial, Yan was sentenced to death and executed on 18 January 2005 in Pingdingshan.

=== New York City, New York, US (2006) ===
Between 13 and 14 June 2006, 20-year-old homeless man Kenny Alexis injured four people within a 13-hour time span in Manhattan, United States. In 2009, Alexis was sentenced to 34 years in prison.

=== Jilin Province, China (2006) ===
Between 24 and 29 September 2006, 35-year-old Shi Yuejun killed twelve people and injured five in Liuhe County and Tonghua County, China. He had killed the first seven people, who were business acquaintances and their spouses, over past conflicts at work, leaving five of their relatives and neighbours injured. During the five-day manhunt, Shi killed another five people and injured one to evade arrest. He was sentenced to death and executed in December 2006.

=== Tsuchiura, Japan (2008) ===
On 23 March 2008, Masahiro Kanagawa (金川 真大, Kanagawa Masahiro; 13 October 1983 – 21 February 2013) killed a 27-year-old man and wounded seven others in Tsuchiura, Japan. Police arrested Kanagawa, then 24, who was wanted in an earlier murder of a 72-year-old man. The man told the investigators that he "just wanted to kill anyone". The suspect stabbed the victims with two knives as they were walking along a short hallway connecting Arakawaoki Station. The 27-year-old died as he was being rushed to a nearby hospital. Police said that Kanagawa liked games and that he hid out in Akihabara while escaping. Some media outlets claimed that he murdered people under the influence of Ninja Gaiden: Dragon Sword. He reportedly sought capital punishment. Tomohiro Katō, who committed the Akihabara massacre, is alleged to have posted a message which referred to his case. The Mito District Court sentenced him to death on 18 December 2009, and he was executed by hanging on 21 February 2013.

=== Tokyo, Japan (2008) ===
On 8 June 2008, Tomohiro Katō drove a rented truck into a crowd and then jumped out with a dagger. He stabbed at least twelve people before he was pursued and captured by police. Four people died of stab wounds, and three died from the truck attack.

=== Osaka, Japan (2008) ===
On 23 June 2008, 38-year-old Kazuka Oyama stabbed two university students and a company executive in the arm at Ōsaka Station, leaving them with light injuries. She was arrested the following day.

=== Beijing, China (2008) ===
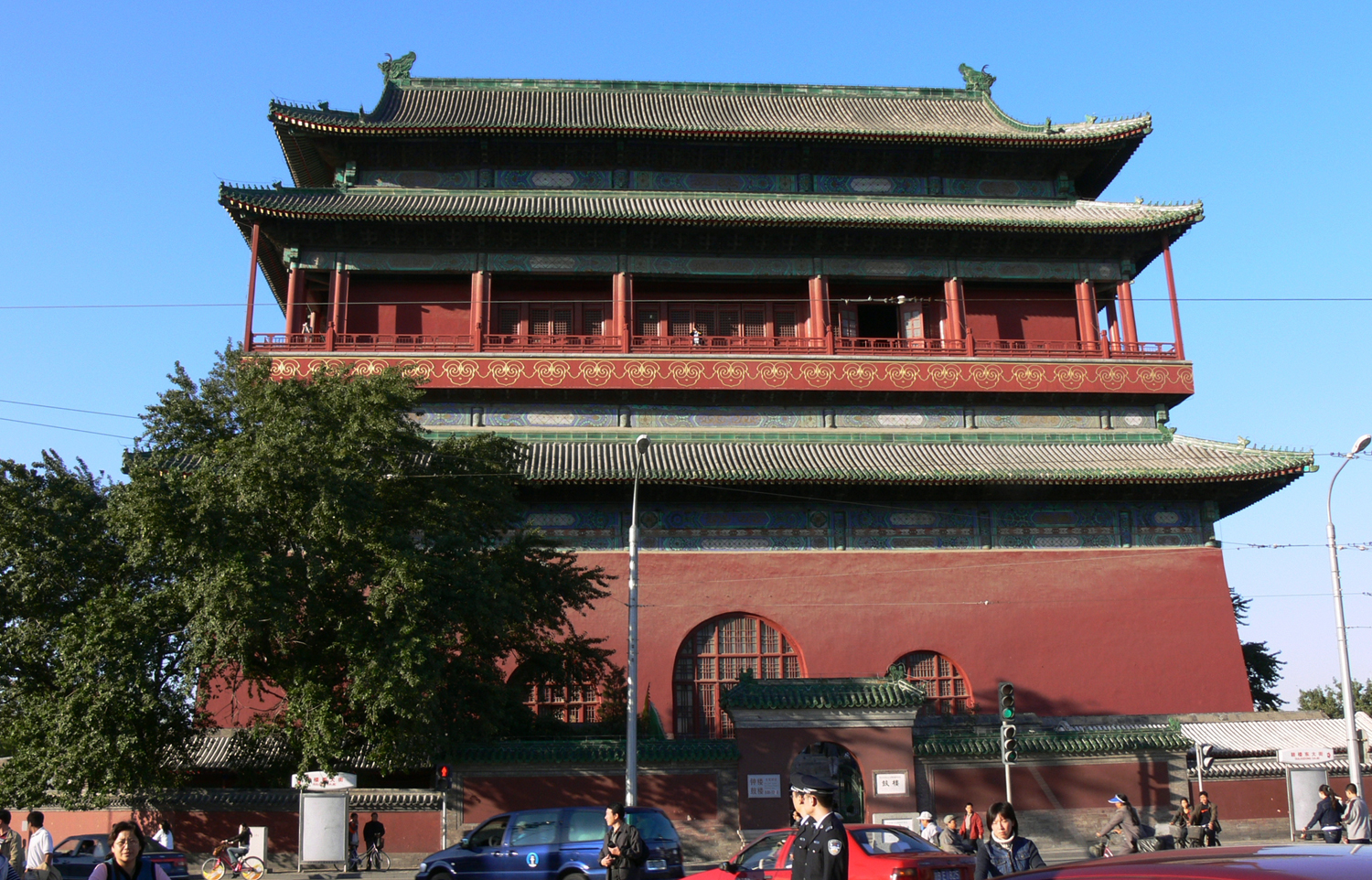
The Drum Tower of Beijing

On 9 August 2008, 47-year-old Tang Yongming killed one and injured two in Beijing, China, during a guided tour of the 13th-century Drum Tower during the 2008 Summer Olympics. The attacker then leapt to his death from a 40-metre (130 ft) high balcony on the Drum Tower.

The victims were an American couple from Lakeville, Minnesota, Todd and Barbara Bachman, and their female Chinese tour guide. Todd Bachman, who died in the attack, was the father of American athlete Elisabeth Bachman and the father-in-law of Team USA men's volleyball coach Hugh McCutcheon, whose team went on to win gold at the Olympic tournament. Barbara Bachman was severely wounded but survived the attack. She and the tour guide were listed in stable condition at a local hospital. Elisabeth Bachman was also on the tour but was uninjured.

Tang Yongming spent most of his life in the outskirts of Hangzhou, and was a metal presser at the Hangzhou Meter Factory for more than twenty years. He had no previous criminal record, according to investigators. Investigators reported that Tang was distraught over family problems. A colleague who knew Tang said that he had "an unyielding mouth", "grumbled a great deal", and was "very cynical". Tang had recently lost his job, with a former co-worker saying that Tang "had a quick temper and was always complaining about society". Police reported that Tang went through his second divorce in 2006 and grew increasingly despondent when his 21-year-old son started getting into trouble. The son was detained in May 2007 on suspicion of fraud, then received a suspended prison sentence in March 2008 for theft.

Shortly after the attacks, the tower was closed to tourists with the surrounding area still open to tourists. Chinese officials strengthened their security measures to alleviate safety concerns. At the time, there were 110,000 officers were stationed in Beijing. There were also 1.7 million volunteers in the city, including 1 million "social volunteers" who "[kept] an eye out for troublemakers". Beijing Olympic official Wang Wei announced that there would be extra security checks implemented at some scenic areas, and large outdoor screens used to view the games around Beijing were muted or turned off to avoid large crowds.

== See also ==
- List of mass stabbing incidents (2020-present)
- List of mass stabbing incidents (2010–2019)
- List of mass stabbings by death toll
