= Tian Mingjian incident =

1994 mass shooting in Beijing

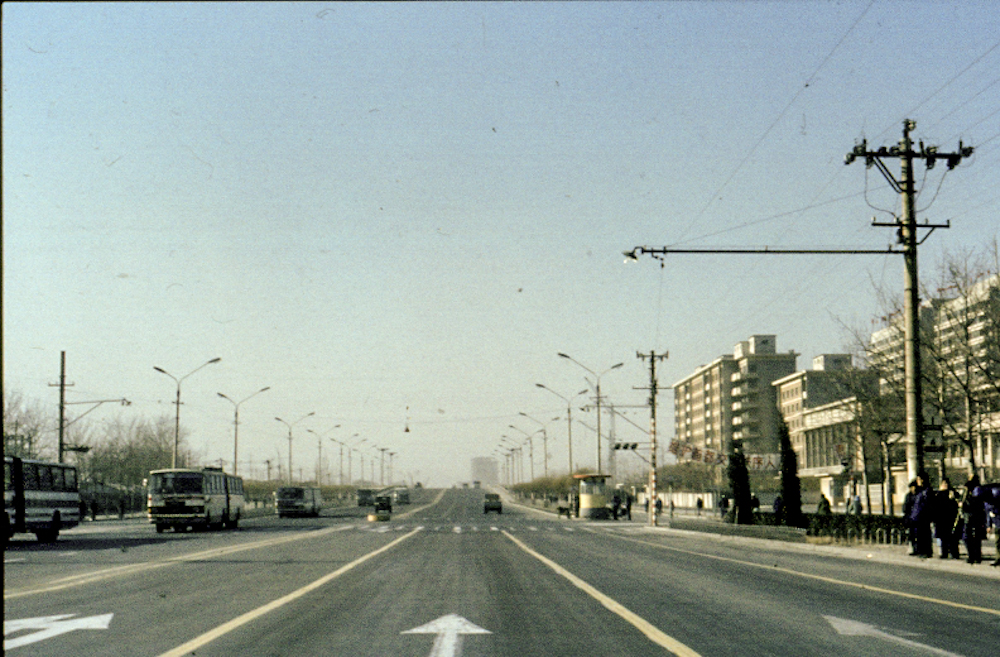
- Chang'an Avenue in 1983, near Jianguo Gate
- Native name: 田明建事件
- Location: 39.9071°N 116.4295°E; Beijing, China
- Date: 20 September 1994; 7:20 a.m. (UTC+8)
- Attack type: Mass shooting, mass murder, Shootout, Workplace violence
- Weapon: Type 81 assault rifle
- Deaths: 24-28+ (17 civilians, multiple soldiers and police officers, and the perpetrator)
- Injuries: 80+
- Perpetrator: Tian Mingjian
- Motive: Possibly a reaction to the forced abortion of the perpetrator's second child, leading to the death of his wife

The Tian Mingjian incident (also known as the Jianguomen incident) was a mass shooting that occurred in Beijing, China on 20 September 1994. People's Liberation Army officer First Lieutenant Tian Mingjian first killed his officer and several other soldiers at his military base in Tongxian County and afterwards drove towards Jianguomen, where he continued his shooting spree and indiscriminately fired at people in the streets. Seventeen civilians, including an Iranian diplomat and his son, along with up to 11 soldiers and policemen were killed before Tian was finally shot dead by a police or military sniper.

== Background ==
Tian Mingjian (Chinese: 田明建), born 20 September 1964, (Note: The shooting took place on his 30th birthday.) was a first lieutenant stationed at an army base in Tongxian County, a suburb of Beijing. He had been in the military for over ten years, originally as a sharpshooter, and was highly skilled in the military technology field. He was once promoted to regimental staff officer for military affairs. At the time of the shooting, he served in this position in the 12th Regiment of the 3rd Guard Division of PLA Beijing Garrison.

It was reported that Tian had a quarrel with his superiors because they had forced his wife to have an abortion when she was pregnant with their second child, in accordance with China's one-child policy. Tian already had a daughter; however, as he came from a rural area in Henan province, where strong traditional values emphasize having a male child, Tian secretly planned on having a son until someone in the army revealed his plan and the birth control officer forced his wife to have an abortion. By then, his wife was already seven months pregnant and died during the operation along with the unborn fetus (later discovered to be a boy). He had also been disciplined for beating another soldier.

=== Official statement ===
In an article published in Xiangchao (《湘潮》), a magazine sponsored by the Party History Research Office of Hunan Province, it was stated that Tian Mingjian usually pursued fame and profit, arbitrarily beat and scolded subordinates, and even gave gifts to the leaders of the regiment in order to be promoted.

According the article, Tian Mingjian was once exposed for accepting bribes and subsequently demoted to the position of deputy platoon leader in the regiment. During his tenure in the regiment, a soldier clashed with Tian after his request for leave to visit relatives was denied, leading Tian to resort to violence against him. This incident prompted superiors to suspend Tian from duty for self-reflection and decide to reorganize the regiment. Dissatisfied with this decision, Tian clashed with company-level leadership and was instructed by regiment-level leadership to return home and engage in farming. Subsequently, Tian committed the shooting in the regimental area, hijacked a vehicle to the city, and later sparked a shooting incident at Jianguomen.

== Shooting ==
=== Army base ===
On 20 September, Tian armed himself with a Type 81 assault rifle and killed the regimental political commissar on the drill ground. He also killed three other military officials who were trying to stop him and injured at least ten more before fleeing the military base. While his fellow soldiers were ordered to change into civilian clothing under orders to not disturb the public when searching for the deserter, Tian hijacked a jeep and headed towards Beijing. Other reports stated he boarded a bus.

=== Jianguomen ===
At 7:20 a.m., when approaching a red light in Jianguomen, the driver crashed his vehicle into a tree and tried to escape. Tian killed him, jumped out of the car and started to shoot people at random while making his way towards the embassy district. He thus killed 17 civilians, including Iranian diplomat Yousef Mohammadi Pishknari and his 9-year-old son, while another of Pishknari's sons and his daughter were wounded.

By then, thousands of police officers were rushing to the scene and tried to apprehend the gunman. They were unable to do so, as Tian was an experienced and excellent marksman. Police surrounded Tian at Yabao Road and engaged in a gun battle with him, in which an undisclosed number of officers were killed, and a number of passers-by hit by bullets. A bus was also caught in the line of fire when the driver in panic stopped his vehicle, resulting in more casualties. Eventually heavy police fire forced Tian to flee into a dead end, where he was killed by a sniper.

The exact number of casualties remains unknown, though in the immediate aftermath 14 people were reported dead, and 72 others wounded, many of them so severely that doctors expected the death toll to rise to 40 or 50. The newspaper Lien Ho Pao reported on 7 December the same year that 15 people were killed, among them six servicemen, and 60 others were wounded. Most of his victims were shot in the head or chest.

== Aftermath ==
When Canadian television began to report live about the shooting at the embassy district, satellite transmission was immediately turned off by the Chinese government and further reporting, including on-site interviews, were prohibited.

Shortly after the shooting, the Beijing Garrison Command (BGC) was ordered by the Central Military Commission to conduct a thorough review of the incident. The investigation was organized by the People's Liberation Army's General Staff Headquarters and the General Political Department and headed by Zhang Zhen, then vice chairman of the Central Military Commission.

Due to the investigation, the commander of the Beijing Military Region, Lieutenant General Li Laizhu, and its political commissar, Lieutenant General Gu Shanqing, were given serious warnings as a disciplinary sanction and serious demerits within the party. It also resulted in the dismissal and demeriting of BGC commander Major General Liu Fengjun and BGC political commissar Major General Yang Huichuan, who were then replaced by He Daoquan and Zhang Baokang. Additionally, the commander and political commissar of the Third Guards Division, as well as the commander of the 12th Regiment and all battalion commanders and instructors under his command, were dismissed while several military officials of the Political Department of the Beijing Military Region, and the Beijing Garrison Headquarters and Political Department were punished. In total, about 60 military officials were punished, demerited, or dismissed as a consequence of the shooting.

Furthermore, the Third Guards Division of the Beijing Garrison was transferred from Beijing to a remote border post, and a general order was issued to the entire army by the Central Military Commission Headquarters to strictly carry out weaponry management system and to strengthen ideological work. Others were awarded for their handling of the shooting, among them an official who directed Tian's interception and the sharpshooter who killed the gunman.
