= List of rampage killers in Asia =

This is a list of mass or spree killers in Asia (excluding China). A mass murderer is typically defined as someone who kills three or more people in one incident, with no "cooling off" period, not including themselves. A mass murder typically occurs in a single location where one or more persons kill several others.

Specific notable subtypes of mass murder, including politically motivated crimes, workplace killings, school attacks and familicides, have their own lists.

This list does not include serial killers or major figures in politics and government who orchestrated such actions.

== Rampage killers ==
Perpetrator	Date	Year	Location	Country	Killed	Injured	W	Additional Notes	Ref
Kim Dae-Han, 56 (김대한)	18 Feb	2003	Daegu	South Korea	192	151+	A	Sentenced to life imprisonment without release, died August 21, 2004	
Woo Bum-kon, 27 (우범곤)	26/27 April	1982	Gungnyu	South Korea	56	≈ 35	FME	Committed suicide Seven victims died later on; attributed to this event	
Zeng Yang, 38 (曾暘); Wang Zhengyi, 48 (王正義)	20 June	1964	Taichung	Taiwan	55	0	F V	Both died in the crash	
Ke-Ke, Huang, 52	Oct 14	2021	Kaohsiung	Taiwan	46	41	A	Sentenced to life imprisonment Without Parole	
Aoba, Shinji, 41	18 July	2019	Kyoto	Japan	36	33	A	Sentenced to death by hanging	
Panya Khamrab, 34	6 Oct	2022	Na Klang district	Thailand	36	10	FMV	Committed suicide	
Toi, Mutsuo, 21 (Note: At least one of the victims was a relative of the assailant.) (都井睦雄)	21 May	1938	Kaio	Empire of Japan	30	3	FM	Committed suicide	
Thomma, Jakrapanth, 31 (Note: Assailant was a member of the military, police, or a comparable force at the time of the rampage.) (จักรพันธ์ ถมมา)	8/9 Feb	2020	Nakhon Ratchasima	Thailand	29	58	F	Killed by police	
Tanimoto, Morio, 61	17 Dec	2021	Osaka	Japan	26	1	A	Died from injuries sustained in the fire	
Unknown	3 June	1938	Ankara	Turkey	26	?	F	Killed by armed citizen or guards	
Unknown Soldier	April 21	1950	Nainital	India	22	?	M		
Unknown	25/26 March	1994	Ta'izz	Yemen	22	?	F	Killed by police	
Uematsu, Satoshi, 26 (植松聖)	26 July	2016	Sagamihara	Japan	19	26	M	Sentenced to death	
Unknown Militiaman	April 1	1978	Dong Doc	Laos	16	60	F E		
Ogawa, Kazuhiro, 46	1 Oct	2008	Osaka	Japan	16	9	A	Sentenced to death	
Siavash Rahmani-Aqdam, 22 (سیاوش رحمانی-اقدم)	26/28 Nov	1998	Tehran	Iran	14	11	F	Killed by police	
Ramesh Sharma, 28 (रमेश शर्मा)	23 July	1983	Mandsaur	India	14	9	F	Killed by police	
Two unknown men		1936	Aksum	Turkey	14	3	FM	Both were killed	
Unknown soldier	14 June	1912	Guangzhou	(Republic of China (1912–1949)) Republic of China	14	2+	F	Killed by soldiers	
Unknown		1879		Qing dynasty	12	4–5	M	Perpetrator injured in the attack, sentenced to death	
Dương Văn Môn, 35	8 Aug	1998	Krông Pắk District	Vietnam	12	6	M	Sentenced to death	
Thapa, Basudev, 26	14 Dec	2005	Chihandanda	Nepal	11	19	F	Killed by soldiers	
Unknown soldier	20 May	1887	Karachi	British Raj	11	0	F	Committed suicide	
Abdullah Saleh Zaid al-Kohali, 26 (عبد الله صالح زيد القهالي)	30 May	2008	Bait al-Aqari	Yemen	10	15	F	Sentenced to death and executed	
Li Hsing-ju, 29 (李興儒)	21 Sep	1959	Nantou City	Taiwan	10	4	F	Committed suicide	
Kim Won-je (김원제)	1 May	1974	Kimpo	South Korea	10	3	F	Committed suicide, one victim succumbed to injuries on May 5	
Unknown	13 Sep	1954	Jorhat	India	10	?	M	Killed	
Hiroshi Taguchi	Nov	1935	Kamijima	Empire of Japan	9	?		Died	
Unknown	Nov	1996		Iran	9	?		Killed	
Ehlil, Nebil, 23	16 April	1969	İshaklar	Turkey	8–10	6–8	F	Killed by police	
Unknown	Oct	1906	Karenni	(British rule in Burma) British Burma	8	15	M	Killed	
Li Han-no	1 June	1921	Tokyo	Empire of Japan	8	9	M	Sentenced to life imprisonment	
Özdemir, Arif Sefa, 30	5 Nov	2026	Afyonkarahisar	Turkey	8	3	F	Arrested	
Unknown soldier	4 Nov	1994	Kurunegala District	Sri Lanka	8	1	F	Committed suicide Terminated a pregnancy	
Chukamnerd, Venus, 52 (วีนัส ชูกำเนิด)	2 March	2008	Hat Yai	Thailand	8	1	F	Sentenced to life imprisonment and died in prison	
Hideo Hosoda	Nov	1938	Shijōnawate, Osaka	Empire of Japan	8	?		Committed suicide	
Mohammed Naji Ahmed al-Amari (محمد ناجي أحمد العماري)	19/21 Aug	2012	Qataba	Yemen	7–10	11–13	F	Killed; Killed a person in 2008	
Abdu Ahmed Mohammed Nasser Al Harazi, 44 (عبده أحمد محمد ناصر الحرزي)	7 July	2008	Aden	Yemen	7	5	F	Died while awaiting trial Killed one and wounded several others in a similar incident a few years prior	
Kato, Tomohiro, 25 (加藤智大)	8 June	2008	Tokyo	Japan	7	10	MV	Sentenced to death and executed	
Two unknown soldiers	29 July	1997	Thừa Thiên–Huế Province	Vietnam	7	4	F	Both committed suicide	
Two unknown men	June	2000	Aal Baseer	Yemen	7	3	F	Both were killed	
Bekçe, Yiğit, 29; Karahasan, Mehmet, 24	20–23 Oct	2006	Kocaeli, Ankara, Mersin, Adana, Bursa	Turkey	7	2	F	Both sentenced to life imprisonment Karahasan killed a man in 1996	
Muhammad Halabi, 32 (محمد حلبي); Mahmoud Halabi	17/19 Oct	1989	Tel Aviv & Jaffa	Israel	7	0	M	Sentenced to life imprisonment	
Unknown	7 Feb	1900	Mount Myōgi	Empire of Japan	7	?	M	Killed	
Unknown		1916	Chanda	British Raj	7	?	F	Committed suicide	
Unknown	Jan	1967	New Delhi	India	7	?	F	Killed by police	
Rha Sung-jong, 22	11 May	1973	Seoul & Jeonju	South Korea	6–7	1	F	Committed suicide	
Unknown	9 June	2022	Daegu	South Korea	6	49	A	Died in the fire	
Unknown soldier	17 May	1985	Anuradhapura	Sri Lanka	6	16	F	Killed by soldiers	
Öztürk, Metin, 37	18 May	2026	Tarsus & Çamlıyayla	Turkey	6	8	F V	Committed suicide	
Mohammad Saeed, 50	23 July	2018	Darot	Pakistan	6	6	F	Committed suicide	
Jamshid Soleimani, 60	Oct	2002	Mahallat	Iran	6	5	F A	Committed suicide	
Unknown	24 June	1878	Hyderabad	British Raj	6	4	F	Killed by soldiers	
Unknown		1900s	Manpaung & Upper Magyibin	British Raj	6	4	M	Sentenced to death; later changed to life imprisonment	
King Kyung-yul	18 Jan	1971	Kimpo	South Korea	6	4	F E	Committed suicide	
Unknown	3 March	1930	Bangkok	Thailand	6	3		Committed suicide	
Hatakeyama, Ikuya, 31 (畠山育也)	6 Nov	1975	Aki	Japan	6	2	F	Sentenced to life imprisonment	
Jitjantuk, Veera, 42 (วีระ จิตร์จันทึก)	27 Oct	1997	Non Dang	Thailand	6	2	F	Sentenced to death	
Unknown, 26	11 Jan	2017	Arak	Iran	6	2	F	Sentenced to death and executed	
Hsiao, ---	24/25 Jan	1965	Taichung	Taiwan	6	1	F	Perished in the fire	
Duleswar Barik	8 Jan	2003	Sundergarh district	India	6	0	M	Sentenced to death	
Dhankar, Naresh Kumar, 45	2 Jan	2018	Palwal	India	6	0	M	Sentenced to death	
Unknown	16 July	2024	Grand Hyatt Erawan Bangkok	Thailand	6	0	P	Suspected murder-suicide according to police	
Sarath, P.G.	22 Aug	1999		Sri Lanka	6	?	F	Committed suicide	
Rati Ram	27/28 Nov	1930	Mudon	British Raj	5–6	3–4	F	Committed suicide	
Nakane, F., 31	April	1922	Tongsakli	Korea	5–6	?	M	Killed by angry mob	
Unknown Sailor		1870s	Muscat	Oman	5	≈20	M	Killed	
Ahn In-deuk, 42 (안인득)	17 April	2019	Jinju	South Korea	5	17	MA	Sentenced to life imprisonment Without Parole	
Uwabe, Yasuaki, 35 (上部康明)	29 Sep	1999	Shimonoseki, Yamaguchi	Japan	5	10	MV	Sentenced to death and executed	
Jeong Sang-jin, 30 (정상진)	20 Oct	2008	Seoul	South Korea	5	7	MA	Sentenced to death One more died by jumping out of a window	
Ko Yone, 42	4 April	2016	Thanbyuzayat	Myanmar	5	5–6	F	Killed by police	
Noi Praidaen, 61	28 July	2025	Bangkok	Thailand	5	2	F	Committed suicide	
Duzhnov, Igor, 54	20 Sep	2021	Almaty	Kazakhstan	5	0	F	Sentenced to life imprisonment	
Cheng Chieh, 21 (鄭捷)	21 May	2014	New Taipei City	Taiwan	4	24	M	Sentenced to death and executed	
Lieu Zang-hyung	2 May	1916	Shanghai	(Republic of China (1912–1949)) Republic of China	4	14	F	Killed by police	
Unknown, 50	7 June	1868	Trebizond	Ottoman Empire	4–10+	7–14	M	Sentenced to death and executed	
Abdul-Fattah Saleh Ali Al-Ghamri, 34 (ويدعى عبد الفتاح القمري)	11 June	2004	Jabal Al-Lessi	Yemen	4	6	F	Killed by police Al-Ghamri's sister killed during shootout	
Unknown	24 May	1964	Tai Po	British Hong Kong	3	12	F	Killed by police	
Chang Wen	19 Dec	2025	Taipei	Taiwan	3	11	AM	Committed suicide	
Meksawat, Kiartipong, 20 (เกียรติพงศ์ เมฆสวัสดิ์)	23 May	2007	Pathum Thani	Thailand	3	7–9	FM	Killed by police	
Zakharov, Dmitry, 34	7 Nov	2020	Yekaterinburg	Russia	3	1	F	Committed suicide	
Lyovkin, Vladimir	27 Jan	2015	Blagoveshchensk	Russia	3	0	F	Committed suicide	

== Home intruders ==
Perpetrator	Date	Year	Location	Country	Killed	Injured	W	Additional Notes	Ref.
Kido, Kumatarō, 36; Tani, Yagorō	25 May	1893	Osaka	Empire of Japan	11	0	FM	Both committed suicide	
Huang Zhiheng, 50 (黃志恆)	4 Aug	1985	Iao Hon	Portuguese Macau	10	0	M	Committed suicide while awaiting trial Killed a man in 1973	
Akşit, Nurettin, 28 (Note: All the victims were members of the same family.)	11 Aug	1986	Dağmarmara	Turkey	9	1	F A	Sentenced to life imprisonment Released from prison in 2003	
Nakamura, Kiichiro, 36 (Note: All the victims were killed in the same household.) (中村喜市郎)	7 Sep	1954	Toyotsu	Japan	8	3	M	Sentenced to death and executed	
Unknown	25 April	2008	Aqrah	Iraq	8	3	F	Committed suicide	
Kumar, Sanjeev; Poonia, Sonia, 20	23 Aug	2001	Hisar	India	8	0	M	Both sentenced to death; later changed to life imprisonment	
Unknown	2 April	1948	Fukagawa	Japan	8	0	M		
Maksim Lyamin, 20 (Максим Лямин); Alexander Pashchenko (Александр Пащенко)	19 March	2011	Surıptaw	Kazakhstan	7	0	M	Lyamin sentenced to life imprisonment Pashchenko sentenced to 20 years in prison	
Permyakov, Valery Pavlovich, 18 (Пермяков, Валерий Павлович)	1 Jan	2015	Gyumri	Armenia	7	0	FM	Sentenced to life imprisonment	
Altun, Mehmet, 33	30 July	2021	Konya	Turkey	7	0	F A	Sentenced to life imprisonment	
Ramachandran, 30	1/2 Feb	1954	Anuradhapura	Sri Lanka	6	1	F	Committed suicide	
Unknown	10 June	1946	Samsun	Turkey	6	0	F	Terminated a pregnancy Killed a man eight years prior	
Antony, 62	6 Jan	2001	Aluva	India	6	0	M	Sentenced to death	
Karlik, Damian, 38 (דמיאן קרליק)	17 Oct	2009	Rishon LeZion	Israel	6	0	MA	Sentenced to life imprisonment	
Nakada Ludeña, Vayron Jonathan, 30	14/16 Sep	2015	Kumagaya	Japan	6	0	M	Sentenced to life imprisonment	
Seyitberdyev, Dovran, 33–34 (Сейитбердыев, Довран)	2 Aug	2018	Baýramaly	Turkmenistan	5	?	M	Sentenced to 25 years in prison	
Mitsai, Ignat	31 Dec	2014	Vladivostok	Russia	3	0	M	Sentenced to 18 years in prison	

== Vehicular homicides ==
Name	Date	Year	Location	Country	Killed	Injured	W	Additional notes	Ref.
Abd al-Hadi Ghanim, 25 (شخص واحد)	6 July	1989	Kiryat Ye'arim	Israel	16	27	V	Sentenced to 16 life sentences	
Santosh Maruti Mane, 40 (संतोष मारुति माने)	25 Jan	2012	Pune	India	9	27–37	V	Sentenced to death	
Khalil Abu Olbeh, 35 (خليل أبو علبة)	14 Feb	2001	Azor	Israel	8	26	V	Sentenced to eight life terms plus 21 years	
Unknown, 26	Oct	1996	Hòa Bình	Vietnam	8	3	V	Committed suicide	
Takeuchi, Keisuke (accused)	15 July	1949	Mitaka	Japan	6	20	V	Died while awaiting execution	
Fadi al-Qanbar, 28 (فادي القنبر)	8 Jan	2017	East Jerusalem, West Bank	Palestine	4	17	V	Killed by police	
Mohammed Faruz Abdallah, 33	1 Nov	1970	Karachi	Pakistan	4	11	V	Sentenced to death	
Serkov, Vladimir Fedorovich, 23 (Серков, Владимир Федорович)	26 Sep	1976	Novosibirsk	Soviet Union	4	11	V	Died in the crash	
Hussam Taysir Dwayat, 32 (حسام دويات)	2 July	2008	Jerusalem		3	36	V	Killed by police	
Ho Chung-ming, 36	30 Aug	1964	Taipei	Taiwan	3	20	V	Sentenced to death	

== Familicides ==
The victims must have been largely the relatives of the perpetrator to be considered a familicide.

Perpetrator	Date	Year	Location	State	Killed	Injured	W	Additional Notes	Ref.
Mohammad Zaman, 30*	Sep 25	2009	Ghola	Islamic Republic of Afghanistan	15–16	?	F	Committed suicide	
Warekar, Asnain Anwar, 35	28 Feb	2016	Thane	India	14	1	M	Committed suicide	
Mangal, 50; Ahmad, 20; Hafizullah, 18	28 Jan	2025	Khost	Afghanistan	13	0	F	Sentenced to death and executed	
Amar Lajdah	12 Oct	2020	Al Bayda	Yemen	12	3	F	Killed by police	
Bahram Jeshanpur, 30	17 Feb	2024	Kerman	Iran	12	3	F	Killed by security forces	
Saeed al-Qashash, 19	10 June	1998	Amman	Jordan	12	0	F	Sentenced to death and executed	
Jalal Osman Khoja, 40* (جلال عثمان خوجة)	26 Dec	2000	Jeddah	Saudi Arabia	11	0	F	Committed suicide	
Abdul Emir Khalaf Sabhan*	26 Aug	2003	Baghdad	Iraq	11	0	F	Committed suicide	
Jamaluddin, 45* (जमालुद्दीन)	4 Jan	2017	Pashim Mahona	India	10	2–4	MP	Committed suicide	
Gurmit Singh, 40*	24 March	2000	Budhanwala	India	10	0	P	Committed suicide	
Unknown*	Sep	2009	Aden	Yemen	10	0	A	Committed suicide	
Dipendra of Nepal, 29*	1 June	2001	Kathmandu	Nepal	9	5	F	Committed suicide	
Taş, Yusuf, 25*	4 Feb	2016	Gaziantep	Turkey	9	2	F	Sentenced to life imprisonment	
Nasir Abbas	20 Aug	2009	Faisalabad	Pakistan	9	0	F	Sentenced to death	
Mohamed Jamil Ahmed, 41*	18 Aug	1955	Sandila	India	8	1	F	Committed suicide	
Chen Yanxiang, 31 (陳彥翔)	15 June	2022	Hsinchu	Taiwan	8	1	A	Sentenced to death	
Ghulam Mohammad*	6 July	2001	Gujar Khan	Pakistan	8	0	F P	Sentenced to death	
Faiz Karbalawi, 50 (فائز کربلاوی)	7 April	2021	Ahvaz & Karun	Iran	8	0	F	Committed suicide	
Ohashi, Kazuo, 26 (大橋一雄)	27 Jan	1946	Wakayama	Empire of Japan	8	0	M	Sentenced to death Later changed to life imprisonment	
Mizuki, Tetsuo., 24 (水木鉄雄)	12 Dec	1953	Niina	Japan	8	0	F A	Found not guilty by reason of insanity	
Taşçı, Ömer, 48*	9 Sep	2007	Karaadilli	Turkey	8	?	F	Sentenced to 80 years in prison	
Ikeda, Kazumichi, 44 (池田一通)	31 Jan	1980	Nigishimacho	Japan	7	3	FM	Committed suicide	
Unknown	Feb	1950		Japan	7	2	P	Committed suicide	
Huseynov, Rafig Muzaffar, 36	1 Oct	2014	Goranboy	Azerbaijan	7	2	F E	Sentenced to life imprisonment	
Fujishiro, Yasutaka, 47* (藤城康孝)	2 Aug	2004	Kakogawa	Japan	7	1	MA	Sentenced to death and executed	
Ram Kishan Patel, 45*	12 March	2006	Datehli	India	7	1	P	Committed suicide	
Kudo, Yonekichi, 60*	12 Oct	1948	Tokyo	Japan	7	0	MA	Committed suicide	
Unknown man, 18	4 March	1957	Kawasaki, Kanagawa	Japan	7	0		Found not guilty by reason of insanity	
Ariyama, Masao, 24 (有山政男)	22 July	1959	Iwatsuki	Japan	7	0	A	Sentenced to death	
Unknown*	Dec	1988		Sri Lanka	7	0	P	Committed suicide	
Mohammed Nawaz*	21 Sep	2002	Islamabad	Pakistan	7	0	F P	Sentenced to death Terminated a pregnancy	
Danışmaz, Hasan, 38*	7 Jan	2008	Sürmene	Turkey	7	0	F	Sentenced to life imprisonment Killed a truck driver in Dec 2001	
Saleh Mohammed, 42–43* (صالح محمد)	22 Oct	2009	Rabia	Iraq	7	0	F	Attempted suicide	
Ihsanullah*	12 Feb	2015	Qalat	Islamic Republic of Afghanistan	7	0	F	Shot dead	
Shravan Kanat, 36*	10/11 Oct	2015	Moti Kosladi	India	7	0	M	Committed suicide	
Unknown*	17 Feb	2001	Bangkok	Thailand	7	?	F	Committed suicide	
Weng Renxian, 50 (翁仁賢)	7 Feb	2016	Taoyuan	Taiwan	6	5	A	Sentenced to death and executed	
Namiki, Kisaburo*	April	1948		Japan	6	1	M	Committed suicide	
Ohba, Shinshe, 32*	1 Feb	1970	Shimabara	Japan	6	1	F A	Committed suicide	
Ram Prasad Karna, 27*	4 April	1977		Nepal	6	1	MP	Terminated a pregnancy	
Noor Din Khan	27 Aug	2019	Sargodha	Pakistan	6	1	FMA	Committed suicide	
Unknown*	April	1933	Viluppuram	British Raj	6	0		Committed suicide	
Unknown police officer*	17 Dec	1949	Rangoon	Burma	6	0	F	Committed suicide	
Po Aung, 40*	March	1965	Mergui	Burma	6	0	M	Committed suicide	
Unknown*	Oct	1974	Balitai	Bangladesh	6	0	P	Committed suicide	
Dilber, Halil, 40*	9 Aug	1986	Killar	Turkey	6	0	FM	Committed suicide	
Bheru Singh*	3 June	1988	Dablana	India	6	0	M	Sentenced to death	
Shaikh Ayub*	5/6 Feb	1995	Bombay district	India	6	0	M	Sentenced to death Later commuted to life imprisonment	
Aydın, Muammer, 26*	2 Dec	1995	Evci	Turkey	6	0	FM	Committed suicide while awaiting trial	
Saroj Bala, 35*	10 April	2002	Hapur	India	6	0	P	Committed suicide	
Jafar Ali, 35*	17 July	2002	Etawah	India	6	0	M	Sentenced to death	
Shibendu Saha*	18 July	2004	Calcutta	India	6	0	MP	Committed suicide	
Jagdiah*	19/20 Aug	2005	Madhya Pradesh	India	6	0	M	Sentenced to death	
I. N., 35	29 May	2008	Abu Alanda	Jordan	6	0	M	Sentenced to death	
Abdul Hafeez Bhatti*	15 Sep	2008	Kabula	Pakistan	6	0	M	Sentenced to death	
Dhal Singh Devangan, 36*	19 Feb	2012	Mohdipat	India	6	0	M	Sentenced to death	
Komatsu, Hirobumi, 32* (小松博文)	6 Oct	2017	Hitachi, Ibaraki	Japan	6	0	MA	Sentenced to death	
Iihoshi, Masahiro, 42 (飯干昌大)	26 Nov	2018	Takachiho, Miyazaki	Japan	6	0	M	Committed suicide	
Appalaraju, Battina, 50*	15 April	2021	Visakhapatnam	India	6	0	M	Sentenced to death	

== Abbreviations and footnotes ==
* – Marks cases where all the victims were relatives of the perpetrator

W – A basic description of the weapons used in the murders

F – Firearms and other ranged weapons, especially rifles and handguns, but also bows and crossbows, grenade launchers, flamethrowers, or slingshots
M – Melee weapons, like knives, swords, spears, machetes, axes, clubs, rods, stones, or bare hands
O – Any other weapons, such as bombs, hand grenades, Molotov cocktails, poison and poisonous gas, as well as vehicle and arson attacks

A – indicates that an arson attack was the only other weapon used
V – indicates that a vehicle was the only other weapon used
E – indicates that explosives of any sort were the only other weapon used
P – indicates that an anaesthetising or deadly substance of any kind was the only other weapon used (includes poisonous gas)
