= Pseudocommando =

Category of mass murderers

In forensic psychiatry, a pseudocommando (or pseudo-commando) is a mass murderer who commits premeditated murder–suicide mass killings driven by revenge fantasies, typically involving the stockpiling of weapons followed by a heavily armed commando-style attack. They usually have no escape plan and either expect to die by direct suicide or to be purposefully killed by police. They typically see their actions through a narcissistic lens as being morally justified in revenge against their unfair treatment by an uncaring world, and wish to "go out in a blaze of glory". They may also leave a final message to the public or news media, such as a manifesto or suicide note.

== Definition ==
The term "pseudocommando" was coined by forensic psychiatrist Park Dietz, who originally categorized mass killers into three categories: Pseudocommandos, family annihilators, and set-and-run killers. Family annihilators (whose crimes are usually called familicides) are the most common, and usually consist of a lone perpetrator killing their own family before they themselves commit suicide. Set-and-run killers usually use an indirect method of killing (such as bombing, arson, or poisoning) and concern themselves with leaving the area before the deaths actually occur. Pseudocommandos usually have a preoccupation with weapons, spend a large amount of time planning out their attack in a public place, such as a school or workplace, usually during broad daylight, and most always make no attempt to get away with their crime, instead seeking to die in or directly after the attack, either by direct suicide or by forcing a confrontation with police or military responders in which they will be killed.

== Characteristics ==
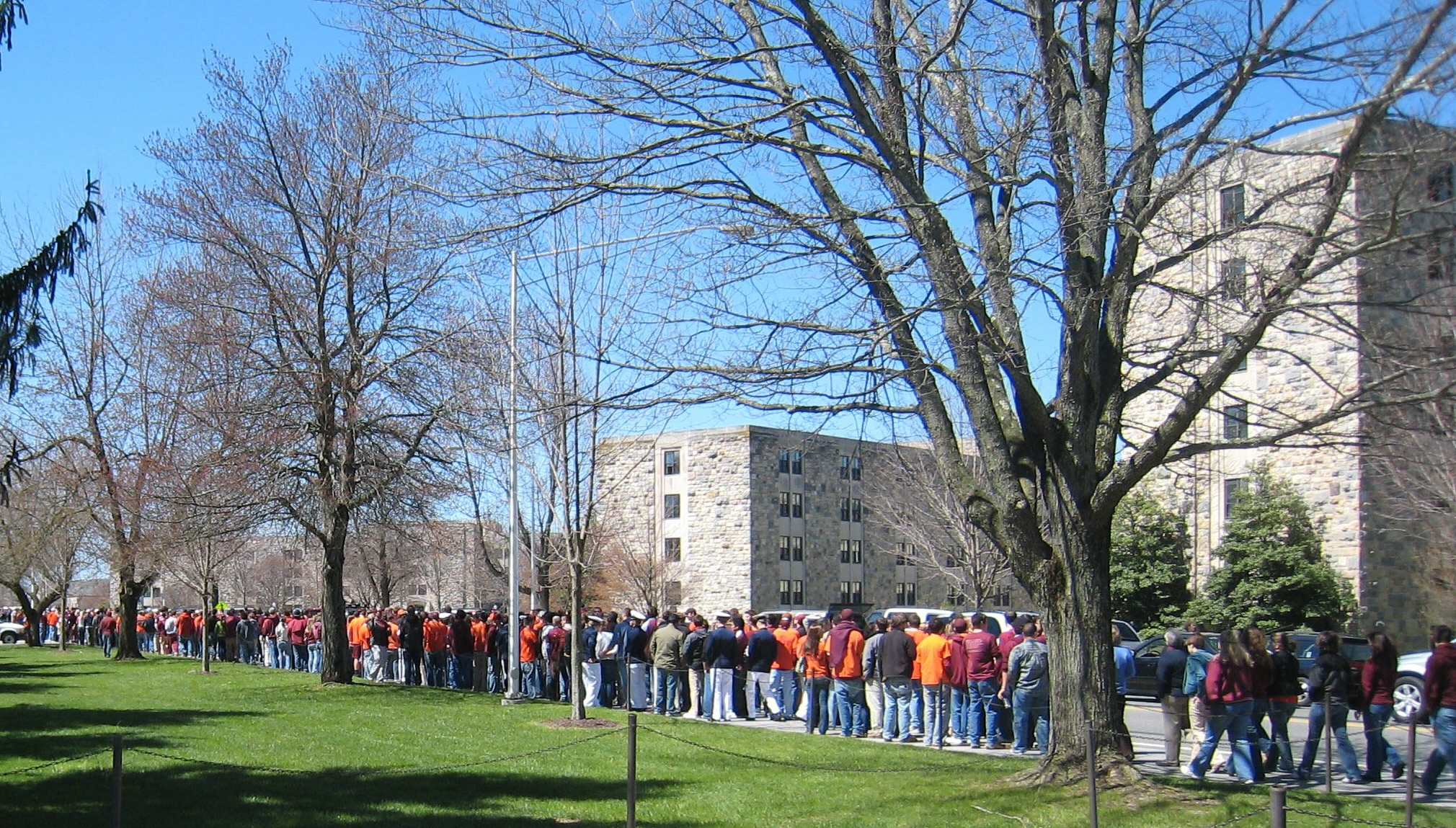
Students gather outside of after the 2007 Virginia Tech massacre, which took 33 lives (including that of the perpetrator). It is often cited as a clear example of a pseudocommando-style rampage.

Pseudocommandos often obsess over feelings of societal rejection and failure, venting their frustration into a rampage on a community that they perceive has wronged them. Their attack can be seen as a sort of statement on society, in which they will "gain control" of what they feel has been unfairly taken from them. Some features often observed in pseudocommandos include dysfunctional family bonds, a lack of social support, and a history of antisocial tendencies. They may also consume media, such as books, films, or videogames, relating to pseudocommandos.

In a case study by psychiatrist James Knoll, former director of psychiatry for the New Hampshire State Prison system, he compared the actions and self-produced recorded statements of two pseudocommando-style killers, Seung-Hui Cho and Jiverly Wong, and found various similarities: They both were heavily armed, wore tactical clothing, thoroughly planned out their actions, acted in broad daylight, and fully expected to die in their attack. They also both sent out final statements of communication, regarding their extreme anger towards society as a whole, along with feelings of persecution and a low self-esteem.

Pseudocommandos will have the tendency to kill themselves after committing the crime and will plan the crime ahead of time to maximize a higher death toll. Planning may include ways on how to obtain weapons (firearms or otherwise), a basic idea of where the majority of people will be, and ways to avoid being subdued by civilians. They may also wish to become posthumously infamous or be otherwise glorified.

== Prevention ==
Such are usually seen as difficult to prevent, as pseudocommandos will not disclose their murderous (and often suicidal) plans until they commit the act. Various possible solutions include third parties who may spot red flags in the would-be perpetrator's behaviors (such as threats of violence, poor mental health, or antisocial acts), a change in sensationalized mass media (which may influence would-be pseudocommandos), and stricter laws on ownership and usage of weapons (such as gun control or knife control).

A 2015 study of four pseudocommando killings found eight common warning signs:

- Conducting research on possible targets or strategies to be used in an attack
- An increasingly growing fixation on a person or cause (political, religious, or otherwise)
- A psychological need to have a "warrior mentality", along with a fascination with weapons or military gear
- Previously unseen or unheard acts of violence or aggression
- An increase in the frequency of activities relating to the planned target
- Communication to a third party of the intent to carry out an attack
- A violent "action/time" imperative, with the would-be perpetrator acting as if they are "running out of time"
- Direct threats against the target or law enforcement previous to the attack

== See also ==
Related terminology

- Active shooter
- Amok syndrome
- Mass shooting
- Mass stabbing
- School shooting
- Spree killer
- Suicide by cop

Pseudocommando examples

- 1938 Tsuyama massacre
- 1982 Woo Bum-kon incident
- 1999 Columbine High School massacre
- 2011 Utøya shooting
- 2014 Isla Vista killings
