= Mass shooting contagion =

Theory about the occurrence of mass shootings in relation to media coverage

Mass shooting contagion theory is the studied nature and effect of media coverage of mass shootings and the potential increase of mimicked events. Academic study of this theory has grown in recent years due to the nature of mass shooting events, frequency of references to previous rampage shooters as inspiration and the acquisition of fame using violence, particularly in the United States. The Columbine High School massacre is cited as being the first shooting to receive nationwide 24/7 publicity, giving both shooters near instant widespread infamy, and thus often is claimed by researchers as being a source of inspiration for would-be copycat mass shooters.

== Theory ==
Coined by the sociologist and researcher David Phillips, this theory is an extension of "cultural contagion" and "behavioral contagion" theories, referring to emulated criminal behaviour through hyper-attention of media coverage towards acts of mass homicide. This theory indicates that through the publicity received from acts of mass murder, perpetrators of this type of criminal act have a fundamental aim of achieving fame or notoriety. Sociologists who have engaged with this theoretical study propose that the 'contagion' aspect of this theory increases the probability that a similar shooting incident will occur, inspired consciously or subconsciously by other rampage shooters. This theory suggests that the increased occurrence of global gun-related crime is linked to the role of mass media platforms in broadcasting and circulating content about this type of criminal behaviour, particularly through public dissemination of the active shooter's identity. The Federal Bureau of Investigation have released publications, A Study of Active Shooter Incidents in the United States Between 2000 and 2013, Active Shooter Incidents in the United States in 2014 and 2015 and Active Shooter Incidents in the United States in 2016 and 2017, that provide data analysis to indicate current crime rates, frequency of events, contributing factors and influence of media coverage in the aim to neutralize this threat. Attempts to reduce the increasing number of mass shooting related incidents have been made through the introduction of stricter gun laws, particularly access to firearms, and movements such as the 'Don't Name Them' campaign.

Analysis of mass shooting media coverage and the impact it has on public moral panics have identified that aspects of media sensationalism and distortion establish a perception of shootings as frequent and recurrent. However, data indicates that mass shooting incidents take the fewest lives out of all subcategories of homicidal crime, but are among the largest portion of crime reported in the media, with recent studies indicating that approximately 50% of news reporting focuses on the broadcasting of violent crime alone. Despite taking the fewest lives among all acts of homicide, the broadcasting of mass shootings yields the capacity to create widespread panic due to their occurrence in a public setting, approximate 24-hour or less time frame, and random selection of victims. Numerous studies conducted by the Federal Bureau of Investigation and the Advanced Law Enforcement Rapid Response Training (ALERRT) research team use statistics from historical shootings as case studies to determine the nature of media coverage and research effects of this media broadcasting to formulate preventive measures.

== Definitions ==
=== Mass shooting ===
Location of Shooting Events by Frequency
School	26	(35.6%)
Workplace	19	(26%)
Bar / Restaurant	8	(11%)
Mall	6	(8.22%)
House	6	(8.22%)
Place of Worship	5	(6.85%)
Spree	3	(4.11%)
- Source: Jaclyn V. Schildkraut

Mass shooting refers to a firearm-related incident occurring in a public setting, resulting in the death of three or more people within one event. Although occurring globally, the majority of mass shootings occur in the United States, with five of the most fatal incidents in their national history occurring from 2007 onwards. According to contemporary research, a 'mass shooting' is defined as (1) the perpetrator committing an act of mass homicide in a 24-hour period, (2) use of a firearm, and (3) the motive of the shooting having an absence of a political agenda or terrorist-group affiliation. Mass shootings usually occur in a public setting; however, in recent history, numerous shootings between 1990 and 2018 in the United States have taken place in schools. A contemporary study conducted by the Federal Bureau of Investigation revealed that between 2016 and 2017, fifty active shooting incidents occurred in 21 states, with approximately 943 casualties (221 people murdered and 743 severely injured). Twenty of those incidents met the defining parameters of a 'mass killing'. Mass shootings warrant global concern with recent figures reflecting that, on average, a mass shooting in the United States will occur every 12–13 days, with school shootings occurring an average of every 32 days. Of these incidents, a mimicked shooting will occur within an estimated 2 week period.

=== Copycat effect ===
The term "copycat effect" refers to the replication of any violent offence, a sub-categorical theory that is closely related to the study of "mass shooting contagion". Although copycat crime is similarly influenced by media coverage of mass violent crimes, this term refers to the potential for mimicked criminal behaviour. Distinguishing these theories, 'mass shooting contagion' theory indicates that all forms of media coverage of mass homicidal events, such as televised coverage, radio broadcasting, editorial and more recently, social media circulation, have a culminated effect in influencing the rise of these crimes. The copycat effect not only relates to the potential emulation of violent offences, however, is used to describe the mimicking of famous criminals themselves, with aims to receive a similar type of fame and social influence.

== Media coverage of mass killings ==
Mass shootings in the contiguous United States in 2024
Mass shootings in Alaska in 2024
Mass shootings in Hawaii in 2024
Mass shootings in Puerto Rico in 2024
Mass shootings in the United States Virgin Islands in 2024

News broadcasting of mass shooting coverage informs the public about aspects of the incident, such as the location, number of casualties, nature of the crime and potentially, identity of the perpetrator. A report released in 2017, 'Dear Members of the Media' urges news reporters to cease publication of names, photos and other forms of identification to limit the potential for mass shooting contagion. Research assessing the effects of violent media in correlation with aggressive behaviour suggests that heightened viewing of murderous media creates an imitative influence on criminal behaviours. According to Indiana State University researcher, Jennifer L. Murray, reporting of mass shooting is reported in seven, cyclical stages: (1) tragic shock, (2) first witness reports, (3) identification of shooter, (4) reports of character of shooter, (5) media branding: the packaging of a massacre, (6) official response and official report, and (7) tragic shock. With media outlets reporting news within a 24-hour news cycle, the capacity for mass shooter's identity to become a focal point of news media increases.

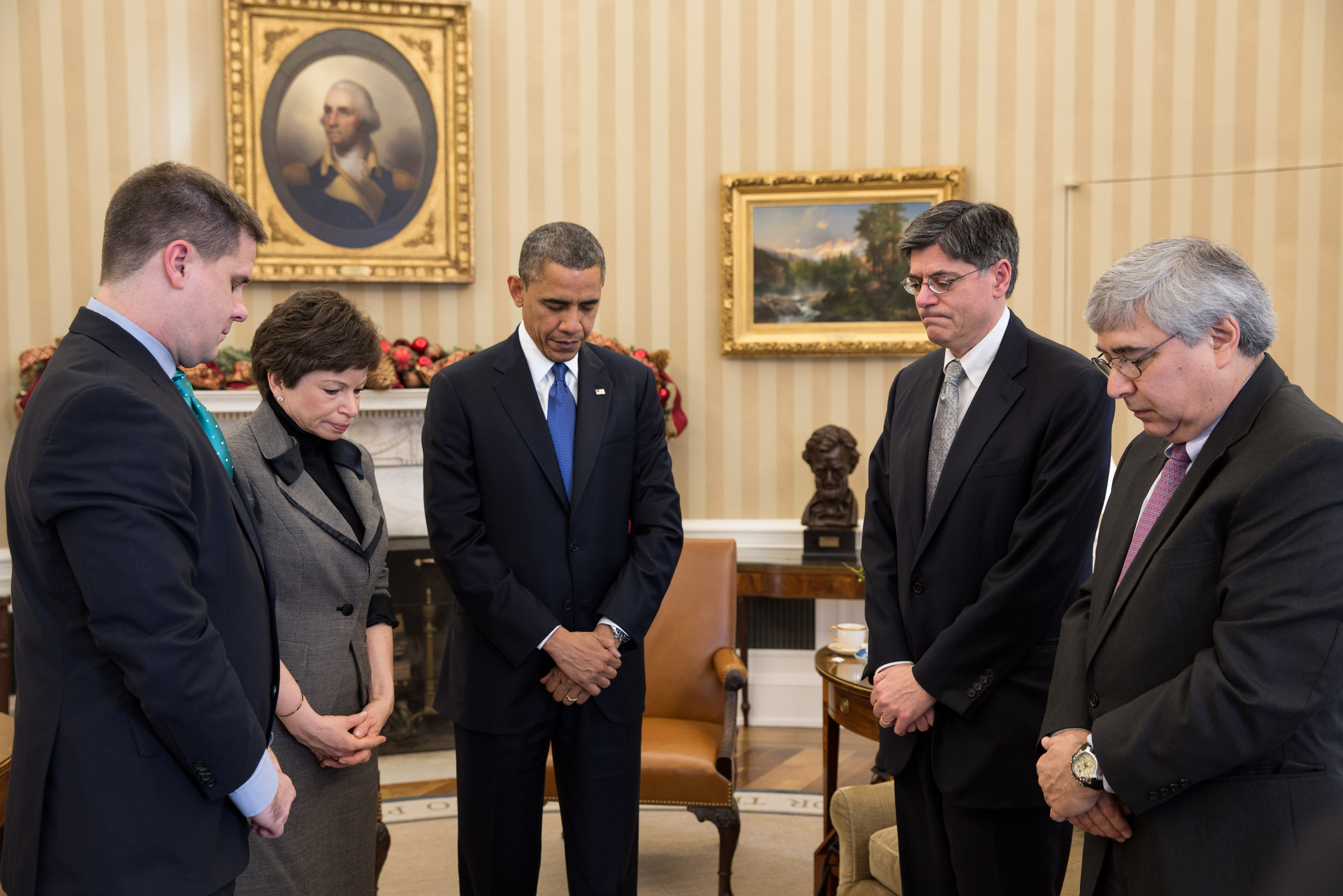
Minute of silence at the White House following the Sandy Hook school shooting in 2012.

=== References to mass casualty events ===
Most Prominent Cases by Coverage (post-Columbine)
	Year	Total Articles
Sandy Hook Elementary School shooting	2012	130
2011 Tucson shooting	2011	89
2009 Fort Hood shooting	2009	36
Virginia Tech shooting	2007	36
2012 Aurora, Colorado shooting	2012	31

== Researched effects of media coverage ==
=== Columbine High School ===
The shooting at Columbine High School in 1999 remains one of the most referenced shootings in US history, with studies indicating that an estimated 10,000 articles were published following the incident. Another study found that in the year that the Columbine shooting occurred, approximately 319 stories about the incident were aired in evening news broadcasts. The Columbine shooters, Eric Harris and Dylan Klebold, expressed their desire for worldwide recognition in ‘basement tapes’ recorded prior to the mass homicide, stating that they aimed for “The most deaths in U.S. history…We’re hoping. We’re hoping.” These tapes circulated numerous media outlets, with stations such as CNN airing coverage of the aftermath of the incident for over a 6-hour period. A study conducted in 2015 suggests that the Columbine shooters inspired a minimum of 21 mimicked shootings and 53 attempted plans to commit such an act in the U.S. over a 15-year period.

=== Virginia Tech ===
The 2007 Virginia Tech shooting received widespread media attention immediately following the incident, with a death toll double that of the Columbine shooting. A study conducted in 2007 by Pew Research Centre suggests that the Virginia Tech shooting was one of the most broadcast events in 2007, despite significant events such as the 2008 presidential election campaign and struggles in the Middle East. A total of 181 articles were published in the New York Times in the first 30 days following the shooting, with numerous media companies, particularly NBC News, broadcasting the gunman's manifesto, leading to much discussion about the impact of violent media, particularly exposure to students. A 2017 study found that 32 perpetrators of mass homicide identified the Columbine shooters as role models in mimicking their attack, whilst the Virginia Tech shooting inspired 8 mass shooting attempts. The Virginia Tech shooter made reference to the Columbine shooting in his video manifesto prior to the act of mass murder, and said he wanted to "repeat Columbine" while in school.

=== Tucson ===
The shooting of United States Representative Gabby Giffords in 2011 appeared on 19 front-page stories (21.3% of coverage), with the majority of news reports directly referencing the identity of the shooter, Jared Lee Loughner. Posting online prior to the shooting, Loughner said, "I'll see you on National T.V.!" and continued with "I have this huge goal at the end of my life: 165 rounds fired in a minute!" Although many media outlets published information about the mass shooting and identification of the offender, coverage focused primarily on debate surrounding reforming gun control laws within the United States.

=== Aurora ===
The Aurora movie theater shooting in 2012 is recognized as the third most referenced shooting in United States history, resulting in the deaths of 12 and severe injuries to 58 others. The shooting instigated the ‘No Notoriety’ movement, with parents of a shooting victim, Tom and Caren Teves pushing for media outlets to limit coverage of homicide events to why and how the crime was committed. Coverage of the shooting focused primarily on gun control laws, with 14 references made towards improving gun control and access policies, found in a total of 12 articles. Despite the majority of media focus being oriented around gun laws, this type of stricter firearm-related legislation has yet to be enacted, instead indicating that the broadcasting of this shooting inspired the shooter of Sandy Hook Elementary in 2012.

=== Sandy Hook Elementary School ===
The Sandy Hook Elementary School shooting killed 27 people, and numerous media outlets covered the event by focusing on the shooter's identity, connections with the school and relationship with family members. The Sandy Hook shooter, Adam Lanza, was active in online commentary about U.S. mass shootings, posting in forums about his studies into the personality and characteristics of mass shooters, once posting a spreadsheet which contained over 500 rampage shooters. Minutes following the mass shooting, media coverage began. Misinformation in the media resulted in numerous media outlets identifying the shooter as Lanza's brother Ryan, resulting in the circulation of pictures and video footage sourced from Ryan's social media. Investigations conducted by the FBI's Behavioral Analysis Unit found that Lanza had begun investigating active shooters in U.S. history in 2011, with the search indicating that infatuation and primary inspiration for his mass homicide included the Columbine and Virginia Tech shooters.

== "Don't Name Them" campaign ==
The "Don't Name Them" campaign is a movement founded by the Advanced Law Enforcement Rapid Response Training Centre (ALERRT), that encourages news corporations to avoid coverage that focuses on a mass shooter's identity, motives, declared manifesto and history. Outlined by a 2019 report from the FBI's Behavioural Analysis unit, media coverage of mass shooting incidents "cements the legacies they seek to achieve" by providing global attention and fame. An extension of the "No Notoriety" campaign founded by Tom and Caren Teves following the shooting in Aurora, Colorado, the "Don't Name Them" movement recognizes that the expression of "all publicity is good publicity" can account for the infamy rampage shooters receive following acts of mass homicide. However, difficulties in keeping the identity of mass shooters completely confidential are acknowledged within this movement due to the abilities afforded by social media platforms to virally stream in real-time and circulate content instantly. Campaigns oriented towards eliminating the identification of shooters are encouraged to continue reporting additional information about the crime, such as the location where the incident occurred and the legislative sentencing for this type of criminal act, as well as replacing the identity of shooters with terms such as "suspect" or "perpetrator".

== See also ==
- Active shooter
- Columbine effect
- Copycat crime
- Mass murder
- School shooting
- Spree killer
