= 1975 Aki shooting =

Mass shooting in Japan

Aki shooting
- Aki (Japan)
- Location: Aki, Kōchi, Japan
- Date: 6 November 1975; 8:40 p.m. (JST)
- Attack type: Mass murder, mass shooting
- Weapon: 12-gauge shotgun
- Deaths: 6
- Injuries: 2
- Perpetrator: Ikuya Hatakeyama
- Motive: Depression, homicidal ideation

The Aki shooting was a mass shooting that occurred on 6 November 1975 in Aki, Japan. 31-year-old Ikuya Hatakeyama shot eight of his neighbours with a 12-gauge shotgun, killing six and critically injuring two. He fled the scene but was apprehended the following day and later sentenced to life imprisonment.

== Shooting ==
At about 8:40 p.m. on 6 November 1975, Hatakeyama walked out of his home and onto the street. There, he began shouting incoherently at his neighbour, the principal of Aki junior high school, before shooting at him with his 12-gauge shotgun. Hatakeyama bought the shotgun at a gun store eight months earlier, as well as 100 rounds of ammunition. Afterwards, Hatakeyama ran into another home, where he fatally shot 46-year-old Hiromichi Ushimade and seriously wounded the man's 27-year-old wife, Kimiko. The couple's son dashed downstairs upon hearing the gunshots and immediately called the police. Meanwhile, Hatakeyama invaded another house and killed its occupants, a 27-year-old woman and her daughter.

He proceeded to enter two more houses, where he fatally shot a 51-year-old man and a 58-year-old woman, mortally wounded a 51-year-old woman, and gravely injured another person. By the time the shooting concluded, Hatakeyama fired over a dozen rounds. The gunfire alerted the locals, who rushed to Hatakeyama and disarmed him. However, the gunman fled the scene.

The Kōchi Prefectural Police launched a manhunt to capture Hatakeyama. With the help of the local fire brigade, they arrested Hatakeyama shortly after 11:00 p.m. the following day. He had been hiding on a hill behind a park about two kilometers away from the shooting.

The event remains as the deadliest mass shooting in Japanese history since the Tsuyama massacre.

== Perpetrator ==
Ikuya Hatakeyama (Japanese: 畠山育也) was born around 1944. His mother died when he was young and he was raised by his aunt. Considered a good student, he did well academically until his graduation from agricultural high school. Afterward, he passed the national civil service exam by the Ministry of Construction and worked for construction offices in Kōchi and Iyo-Mishima.

Hatakeyama was a timid man who had trouble socializing. In 1972, was admitted to a psychiatric institution because of mental instability and diagnosed with depression, leading the Ministry of Construction to retire him. He was discharged from the hospital three months prior to the shooting and got a job at a toothpick factory in Ioki.

=== Legal proceedings ===
During his interrogation, Hatakeyama stated that he committed the shooting because he was depressed and wanted to kill people. He said he had no grievances with the victims, and that he did not care who they were. At his trial, the prosecution argued that he did have a mental breakdown, but was not insane at the time of the murders and should be sentenced to life imprisonment. However, three psychologists diagnosed Hatakeyama with schizophrenia and paranoia and concluded he was insane at the time of the shooting, so he was acquitted by reason of insanity in September 1981. The prosecution subsequently appealed the verdict, and Hatakeyama was sentenced to life imprisonment without the possibility of further appeals at his new trial on 4 December 1984.

== See also ==
- List of rampage killers in Asia
- List of massacres in Japan
