= 2010 Habikino shooting =

Mass shooting in Japan

- Location of Habikino in Osaka
- Location: Iichan bar, Habikino, Osaka Prefecture, Japan
- Date: 12 January 2010; 20:00 JST (UTC+09:00)
- Attack type: Mass shooting, murder-suicide
- Weapon: Rifle
- Deaths: 4 (including the perpetrator)
- Injuries: 0
- Perpetrator: Yasuhisa Sugiura

The 2010 Habikino shooting was a deadly spree shooting which occurred at a drinking establishment located just south of Eganoshō Station in Habikino, Osaka Prefecture, Japan on 12 January 2010.

The attack was carried out by 49-year-old Yasuhisa Sugiura (Japanese: 杉浦 泰久). Three people, including the gunman's mother-in-law, were shot dead before the perpetrator committed suicide.

Shooting incidents such as these are rare in Japan.

== The perpetrator ==
Yasuhisa Sugiura (born 1960), 49, was a longtime resident of Habikino and a government employee in Japan's second-largest city Osaka. According to police, he was involved in a "troubled marriage" with a 48-year-old woman.

== Shooting ==
On 12 January 2010, Sugiura went to the Ii-chan bar to discuss a divorce with his mother-in-law, 66-year-old Yoshiko Tanaka (Japanese: 田中 美子), who would subsequently become one of his victims. The bar was open for business and had other customers inside; Sugiura's wife was possibly one of them. Sugiura then departed. Sugiura came back armed with a rifle and opened fire at approximately 20:00 that evening, killing three people. Two of Sugiura's targets — the mother-in-law and a 23-year-old bar employee named Tatsuya Fukui (Japanese: 福井 達也) — died immediately; a third, 49-year-old bar landlord Hiroto Uehara (Japanese: 上原 浩人), died shortly thereafter. Witnesses described the rifle shots as "three or four blunt bangs"; a pool of blood was left in front of the bar.

Sugiura then exited the bar and shot himself in the abdomen, killing himself.

== See also ==
- 1975 Aki shooting
