= Kumatarō =

Kumatarō is a masculine Japanese given name. Notable people with the name include:

- Kumataro Ito (c. 1860 – c. 1930), illustrator on board the Bureau of Fisheries Steamer U.S.S. Albatross during the Philippine Expedition from 1907 to 1910
- Kumatarō Kido (城戸 熊太郎, c.1857 – 1893), Japanese spree killer who killed 11 people on May 25, 1893
- Kumataro Honda (本多 熊太郎, 1874-1948), Japanese diplomat
