= Yiğit Bekçe and Mehmet Karahasan =

Turkish spree killers

Yiğit Bekçe (born 1977) and Mehmet Karahasan (born 1982), collectively known as The Highway Killers (Turkish: Otoban katilleri), are Turkish spree killers who killed seven people and injured two others during a 52-hour trip across six cities in October 2006. The first known spree killers in the country's history, the pair were jointly convicted of the killings in 2011 and given five life terms.

== Backgrounds ==
The older of the pair, Yiğit Bekçe, was born in Gemlik in 1977. He dropped out of secondary school and started committing crimes at age 17. By the time he and Karahasan met, Bekçe had amassed 18 criminal convictions for crimes such as assault, extortion and theft.

Mehmet Karahasan was born in Akyazı in 1982, and by the time of his first arrest, he was still a high school student. At age 14, he killed the son of a wealthy family whom he believed was molesting his sister. For this crime, he was sent to prison but released after four years, whereupon he started working various odd jobs to support himself.

The pair crossed paths sometime in 2006, with both in the midst of a drug addiction. After finding out that they both had criminal records, Bekçe and Karahasan decided to team up and started committing crimes together.

== Murders ==
On October 20, 2006, the duo rented a car and set off on a road trip across the country, robbing and killing their victims using a shotgun. Their first victim was 20-year-old Hüseyin Çalışkan, a clerk at a candy store stationed along the Bursa-Yalova Highway, whom they shot at around 10:30 PM. Five hours later, they shot and killed 21-year-old Fatih Kılıç, a clerk working at a store near the İzmit highway.

On October 22, the pair shot gas station attendant Mehmet Çakır at his workplace in Hendek, followed shortly after by kiosk owner Özkan Köse in Mersin. Their final victim for that day was 40-year-old Bekir Ciritçi, whose car they hijacked along the Pozantı-Çamalan highway and later shot him to death.

Finally, on October 23, at 1:20 AM, they killed gas station attendant Enver Aycık and store employee Necati Yücel, both of whom worked in Ankara's Gölbaşı district. Both Bekçe and Karahasan were identified via the gas station's CCTV, and were apprehended shortly after. In total, from their first murder to their capture, the pair had travelled a total of 1,944 km in 53 hours.

== Trials and sentences ==
Due to the fact that the seven murders were committed in six different jurisdictions, it was decided that Bekçe and Karahasan would be tried separately in each city for the respective killing in six trials that lasted from 2007 to 2011. A third defendant, Celal Okumuş, was acquitted due to lack of evidence of his involvement in the murders.

In the end, both men were given five consecutive life sentences, with Bekçe receiving an additional 40 years and 6 months imprisonment, while Karahasan was given 55 years and 6 months imprisonment.

The Adana Police Department was later sued by the family members of Bekir Ciritçi, who claimed that their gross negligence led to his death. The case was dismissed, and the request for financial compensation denied.

== See also ==
- List of rampage killers in Asia
