= Investigative Assistance for Violent Crimes Act =

2012 United States federal law

Investigative Assistance for Violent Crimes Act of 2012
- Long title: An Act to amend title 28, United States Code, to clarify the statutory authority for the longstanding practice of the Department of Justice of providing investigatory assistance on request of State and local authorities with respect to certain serious violent crimes, and for other purposes.
- Acronyms (colloquial): IAVCA
- Enacted by: the 112th United States Congress

Citations
- Public law: Pub. L. 112–265 (text) (PDF)

Codification
- Titles amended: 28
- U.S.C. sections amended: 530C

Legislative history
- Introduced in the House by Trey Gowdy (R‑SC) on June 1, 2011; Passed the House on September 12, 2011 (358 to 9); Passed the Senate on December 17, 2012 (unanimous); Signed into law by President Barack Obama on January 14, 2013

The Investigative Assistance for Violent Crimes Act of 2012 (IAVCA) is a federal law in the United States that clarifies the statutory authority for federal law enforcement agencies to provide investigatory assistance to the States. The Act provided that, upon request from a state or local government, federal law enforcement may assist in the investigation of violent crime occurring in non-federal, public places. The Act did not create any new crimes but rather mandated a definition, across federal law enforcement agencies, of "mass killings" as a killing of three or more victims in the same incident. The Act enabled the Federal Bureau of Investigation to develop a program of research and training to address active shooter incidents.

== Background ==
The Federal Bureau of Investigation (FBI) has statutory authority to investigate violations of a federal laws, crimes occurring at federal sites, and murders committed in the course of federal crimes. Prior to the Act, the FBI had long provided, without explicit statutory authority, investigative assistance to state and local law enforcement in cases of violent crime occurring in non-federal locations, and in cases where no federal crime was apparent. The FBI sought clarification of its responsibilities in assisting state and local governments in investigations.

FBI classifications of multiple homicides (such as "double," "triple," or "mass murder," or "serial" or "spree killings") are largely designed to support law enforcement in investigations, as frameworks for organizing criminal profiling knowledge, rather than designed to facilitate statistical data collection. Prior to the Act, the FBI recognized "mass murder" as four or more murders occurring during the same incident, with no distinctive time period between murders.

== Legislative history ==
The Act was introduced to the House by first-term Representative Trey Gowdy (R‑SC) on June 1, 2011, and passed by the House 358 to 9. The Act was Gowdy's first bill to pass out of committee (Judiciary), and his first bill to pass the House. Gowdy said,

The FBI, in reviewing their investigative assistance to state and local authorities, realized the absence of a federal statute directly providing jurisdiction to the FBI to respond to such requests. This bill grants that specific statutory authority.

The Act received renewed attention in the aftermath of the Sandy Hook Elementary School shooting in Newtown, Connecticut on December 14, 2012. The corresponding Act was introduced to the Senate by Senator Sheldon Whitehouse (D‑RI) and passed unanimously by the Senate on December 17, 2012. The Federal Law Enforcement Officers Association supported the legislation. Whitehouse said,

The FBI and other federal law enforcement agencies are often crucial allies for local and state officials working to respond to mass shootings and other violent crimes, as they have been in Connecticut over the past few days. This bill will give these agencies clear authority to continue to provide this assistance to the state and local law enforcement officials who have primary responsibility to solve these terrible crimes and protect our communities.

After amendment, reconciliation, and passage by both Houses of Congress, the Act was signed into law by President Barack Obama on January 14, 2013.

== Provisions ==
The Act clarified the federal role in assisting investigation of violent crime occurring in non-federal, public places. The Act authorized two Cabinet-level federal Departments, Justice (DOJ) and Homeland Security (DHS), to assist in investigations of violent crimes in public areas, but only after a request from a state or local law enforcement agency; the Act did not expand federal jurisdiction, and did not establish any new crimes, penalties, or regulations.

The Act mandated a definition of "mass killing" as three or more killings during an incident. The Act made no reference to the choice of weapon. Not all mass murders or mass killings involve firearms. "Mass shootings" are a subtype of mass murders or mass killings in which a firearm is used during the incident; that is, mass killings include mass shootings.

== Impact ==
The Attorney General delegated the new DOJ responsibilities under the Act to the FBI. (The Act made no specific reference to the FBI). The Act compelled the FBI to modify its long‐standing definition of mass murder, broadening the scope from four to three fatalities. Responding to written questions from a House Committee on Appropriations subcommittee in April 2013, DOJ highlighted three efforts due in part to the Act: developing and delivering "hands-on training to front line state, local, tribal and campus police officers," hosting conferences for law enforcement chief and command staff, and developing and running tabletop exercises. Resources available to state and local government due in part to the Act include "training for first responders, conferences for law enforcement executives, operational support in the event of an active shooter event, and assistance to victims," according to the FBI writing in 2014.

In response to the Act, starting in January 2013, Mother Jones magazine lowered their threshold for inclusion in their database of mass shootings from four to three victims killed.

=== FBI active shooter program ===
Pursuant to the responsibilities assigned to DOJ by the Act, the FBI initiated a program including research into active shooter incidents and the development of training resources in support of helping national, state, and local law enforcement agencies prevent, respond to, and recover from such attacks. The definition of "active shooter," agreed to by The White House, the DOJ including the FBI, DHS including the Federal Emergency Management Agency, and the Department of Education, is:

...one or more individuals actively engaged in killing or attempting to kill people in a populated area. Implicit in this definition is the shooter's use of one or more firearms.

In contrast with the definitions of mass killings or mass murder, the definition of active shooter includes the use of firearms, but does not include a threshold for fatalities (which may be none). This scope of this program is explicitly not mass killings or mass shootings but rather "a study of a specific type of shooting situation law enforcement and the public may face." Gang- and drug-related incidents are out of scope of this initiative. The first report was published in September 2014 and covered the period 2000 through 2013; the FBI has since published annual updates as well as a 20-year review covering 2000 through 2019.

== See also ==
- Mass shooting
