= Active shooter =

Perpetrator of a mass shooting

A New York Times study reported how outcomes of active shooter attacks varied with actions of the attacker, the police (42% of total incidents), and bystanders (including a "good guy with a gun" outcome in 5.1% of total incidents).

An active shooter is the perpetrator of an ongoing mass shooting. The term is primarily used to characterize shooters who are targeting victims indiscriminately and at a large scale, who oftentimes, will either commit suicide or intend to be killed by police. More generally, an active perpetrator of a mass murder may be referred to as an active killer.

The Federal Bureau of Investigation defines an active shooter as "one or more individuals actively engaged in killing or attempting to kill people in a populated area", excluding gun-related incidents that were the result of self-defense, gang or drug violence, residential or domestic disputes, crossfire as a byproduct of another ongoing criminal act, controlled barricade or hostage situations, or actions that appeared not to have put other people in peril. In 2008, the United States Department of Homeland Security defined an active shooter as "an individual actively engaged in killing or attempting to kill people in a confined and populated area; in most cases, active shooters use firearms and there is no pattern or method to their selection of victims."

Most incidents occur at locations in which the killers find little impediment in pressing their attack. Locations are generally described as soft targets, that is, they carry limited security measures to protect members of the public. In most instances, shooters die by suicide, are shot by police, or surrender when confrontation with responding law enforcement becomes unavoidable, and active shooter events are often over in 10 to 15 minutes. "According to New York City Police Department (NYPD) statistics, 46 percent of active shooter incidents are ended by the application of force by police or security, 40 percent end in the shooter's suicide, 14 percent of the time the shooter surrenders, and in less than 1 percent of cases the violence ends with the attacker fleeing."

== Terminology ==
The Federal Bureau of Investigation defines an active shooter as "one or more individuals actively engaged in killing or attempting to kill people in a populated area.", excluding self-defense, gang or drug violence, crossfire, and domestic disputes.

In 2008, the United States Department of Homeland Security defined an active shooter as "an individual actively engaged in killing or attempting to kill people in a confined and populated area; in most cases, active shooters use firearms and there is no pattern or method to their selection of victims."

The terminology "active shooter" is critiqued by some academics. There have been several mass stabbings that have high casualty counts, for instance in Belgium (Dendermonde nursery attack; one adult and two infants dead), Canada (2014 Calgary stabbing; five adults dead), China (2008 Beijing Drum Tower stabbings; one adult dead), Japan (Ikeda school massacre and Sagamihara stabbings; eight children and nineteen sleeping disabled adults dead, respectively), and Pennsylvania (Franklin Regional High School stabbing; no deaths). Ron Borsch recommends the term rapid mass murder. Due to a worldwide increase in firearm and non-firearm based mass casualty attacks, including attacks with vehicles, explosives, incendiary devices, stabbings, slashing, and acid attacks, Tau Braun and the Violence Prevention Agency (VPA) has encouraged the use of the more accurate descriptor mass casualty attacker (MCA).

In police training manuals, the police response to an active shooter scenario is different from hostage rescue and barricaded suspect situations. Police officers responding to an armed barricaded suspect often deploy with the intention of containing the suspect within a perimeter, gaining information about the situation, attempting negotiation with the suspect, and waiting for specialist teams like SWAT.

If police officers believe that a shooter intends to kill as many people as possible before killing themselves, they may use a tactic like immediate action rapid deployment.

=== United States federal definition ===
In the United States, the Investigative Assistance for Violent Crimes Act of 2012, passed in the aftermath of the Sandy Hook Elementary School shooting in Newtown, Connecticut, clarified the statutory authority for federal law enforcement agencies to provide investigatory assistance to the States. The definition of "active shooter," subsequently agreed to by The White House, the Department of Justice (DOJ) including the Federal Bureau of Investigation (FBI), the Department of Homeland Security (DHS) including the Federal Emergency Management Agency (FEMA), and the Department of Education (DOE), is:

...one or more individuals actively engaged in killing or attempting to kill people in a populated area. Implicit in this definition is the shooter’s use of one or more firearms.

In contrast with the definitions of mass killings or mass murder, the definition of active shooter includes the use of firearms, but does not include a threshold for fatalities (which may be none).

==== FBI active shooter program ====
Pursuant to the responsibilities assigned to the DOJ by the Act, the FBI initiated a program including research into active shooter incidents and the development of training resources in support of helping national, state, and local law enforcement agencies prevent, respond to, and recover from such attacks. The scope of this program is explicitly not mass killings or mass shootings but rather "a study of a specific type of shooting situation law enforcement and the public may face." Gang- and drug-related incidents are out of scope of this initiative. The first FBI report on active shooter incidents was published in September 2014; the FBI has since released annual updates and a 20-year review.

The 2014 FBI report on active shooter incidents covered the period 2000 through 2013 and was the first time the United States federal government comprehensively identified and studied active shooter incidents over a significant period of time. 160 incidents and 486 deaths were included in the study. The frequency and severity of active shooter incidents rose during the study period, averaging 6.4 incidents per year from 2000 through 2006 and 16.4 incidents per year from 2007 through 2013, with 366 of the 486 deaths occurring from 2007 through 2013.

According to the 2022 FBI report, the frequency of active shooter incidents rose in 2021, with 61 incidents, up from 40 in 2020 and 30 in each of 2018 and 2019. 103 victims were killed and 140 wounded in the 2021 incidents (not including the perpetrators). In 2021, more active shooting incidents involved multiple locations. All but one of the 2021 active shooters were male. Thirty of the 61 2021 active shooters were apprehended by law enforcement, 14 were killed by law enforcement, eleven took their own lives, and four were killed by armed citizens.

According to the 2023 FBI report, the number of casualties in active shooter incidents rose in 2022, with 100 killed and 213 injured (not including the perpetrators) in 50 incidents. Twenty-nine of the 50 2022 active shooters were apprehended by law enforcement, seven were killed by law enforcement, two were killed by armed citizens, nine took their own lives, and three remained at large.

== Tactical implications ==
According to Ron Borsch, active shooters are not inclined to negotiate, preferring to kill as many people as possible, often to gain notoriety. Active shooters generally do not lie in wait to battle responding law enforcement officers. Few law enforcement officers have been injured responding to active shooter incidents; fewer still have been killed. As noted, more often than not, when the prospect of confrontation with responding law enforcement becomes unavoidable, the active shooter commits suicide. And when civilians—even unarmed civilians—resist, the active shooter crumbles.

Borsch's statistical analysis recommends a tactic: aggressive action. For law enforcement, the tactical imperative is to respond and engage the killer without delay‍—‌the affected orthodoxy of cumbersome team formations fails to answer the rapid temporal dynamics of active shooter events and fails to grasp the nature of the threat involved. For civilians, when necessity or obligation calls, the tactical mandate is to attack the attacker—a strategy that has proved successful across a range of incidents from Norina Bentzel (William Michael Stankewicz) in Pennsylvania and Bill Badger in Arizona (2011 Tucson shooting) to David Benke in Colorado.

== Causation ==
Accounts of what factors lead to this type of incident vary. Some contend that the motive, at least proximately, is vengeance. Others argue that bullying breeds the problem, and sometimes the active shooter is a victim of bullying, directly or indirectly. Still others such as Grossman and DeGaetano argue that the pervasiveness of violent imagery girding modern culture hosts the phenomenon. Another suggestion is that a particular interpretation of the world, a conscious or subconscious ontology, accounts for the phenomenon. Proponents of this idea argue that the active shooter lives in a world of victims and victimizers, that all are one or the other. The ontology accommodates no room between the categories for benevolence, friendship or a mixture of good and bad. Their interpretation of the world may be fed by bullying or violent imagery (hence the common obsession with violent movies, books or video games), but it is the absolutist interpretation that drives them both to kill and to die.

In The Psychology of the Active Killer, Daniel Modell writes that "The world conceived by the active killer is a dark dialectic of victim and victimizer. His impoverished ontology brooks no nuance, admits no resolution. The two categories, isolated and absolute, exhaust and explain his world. And the peculiar logic driving the dialectic yields a fatal inference: in a world of victims and victimizers, success means victimization."

== See also ==
- Ballistic shield
- Immediate action rapid deployment
- Pseudocommando
- Running amok
- School shooting
- Spree killer
- Active shooter training
