= Immediate action rapid deployment =

Law enforcement technique

Immediate action rapid deployment (IARD), or rapid deployment, is a police tactic where first responders, typically regular police officers, actively confront a developing high-risk crisis. This is opposed to first responders acting to assemble a cordon around the crisis zone and then waiting for specialized special response units to spearhead a resolution.

IARD seeks to combat crimes which are generally the purview of special response units, but where special response units may not arrive in time to preserve the lives or property of victims.

== Description ==
IARD is used to confront aggressive criminals who pose an immediate and life-threatening threat to public safety. These include violent criminals armed with personal weapons, including firearms or bombs. Confronting these criminals is especially important when the crisis occurs in public spaces, public facilities or utilities, or other venues with large populations.

First responders are tasked with aggressively prosecuting a resolution to the crisis. They must swiftly locate and close in on threats, neutralizing them at the earliest opportunity. To do so they may be required to move through unsecured areas, past injured or panicked victims. Responders may, at their discretion, assist affected individuals.

IARD authorizes first responders to be proactive and disrupt a crime before criminals become "active shooters." IARD shares characteristics with active shooter response procedures.

== Preparation ==
IARD exposes regular officers to increased risk, and is made possible by additional training and equipment. Officers may be provided with additional body armour, including helmets and ballistic shields, to be used at the crisis scene and not during regular duties. The equipment must be easy to put on: excessive time spent gearing up may forestall a decisive intervention.

== Rationale ==
IARD is partially a response to murder–suicides where criminals attack large groups and then kill themselves when confronted by armed responders. In a school shooting scenario, the attacker seeks only to maximize casualties, with most occurring within the first 15 minutes. It is not feasible to follow a traditional hostage-type scenario and await a negotiator.

In these situations, first responders who quickly and decisively close with the attacker may prevent further casualties. At the very least, it prevents the attacker from establishing control over the environment needed to cause more casualties. IARD overcomes the inherent desire to take time to devise a solution that minimizes casualties amongst officer and victims, in situations where any delay causes further casualties.

However, as many schools have developed lock-down protocols in the wake of incidents such as Columbine, the increased risk posed by IARD may become inappropriate in such cases where the venue itself has already contained the shooter's movements and reduced the number of exposed targets in their locked down posture.

== EMS response as part of IARD ==
Some emergency medical services (EMS) have changed their response to these events and have improved their aggression to be more in line with the rapid PD response. This new concept is commonly referred to as the rescue task force or RTF. The RTF is made up of a team of two medical personnel and 2-6 law enforcement officers. All personnel are trained in basic tactical movement, and the medical personnel operate utilizing protocols derived from the TCCC protocols used by the United States military in war zones to enter in with a police escort just behind the initial contact teams and provide immediate treatment to patients.
