= Poonia murders =

2001 massacre in India

Relu Ram Poonia MLA murder case or Poonia murders
- Location: India
- Date: 23 August 2001
- Deaths: 8

The Relu Ram Poonia MLA murder case or Poonia murders was a mass murder of the Indian politician Relu Ram Poonia and seven of his family members. The murders were committed by Ram's daughter Sonia, along with her husband Sanjeev Kumar, on the night of 23 August 2001 over a property dispute. The case was filed and Sonia, Sanjeev and various members of his family were tried. The couple were convicted of the murder charges and sentenced to death by the district court. The sentence was reduced to life imprisonment by the Punjab and Haryana High Court but the death sentence was reinstated by the Supreme Court of India. The couple remained in jail during the process when, under the section 72 (1) of the Constitution of India, a mercy petition was raised. The petition went unanswered by then President Pratibha Patil but was rejected by her successor Pranab Mukherjee. However, the couple's death sentence was reverted to life imprisonment after a petition was filed by the civil rights group People’s Union for Democratic Rights (PUDR) citing delays in the disposal of the mercy plea as grounds for clemency, which the Supreme Court accepted in January 2014.

== Crime ==
Relu Ram Poonia (age 50), his second wife Krishna (age 41), his daughter Priyanka (age 16), his son Sunil (age 23), his daughter-in-law Shakuntala (age 20), his grandson Lokesh(age 4), and his two granddaughters Shivani (age 2) and Preeti (age 3 months) were murdered at their farmhouse in Litani on the night of 23 August 2001, while they were asleep. Sonia murdered the family by bludgeoning them with a heavy metal rod. The bodies were found in various locations inside the two-storey mansion when a servant arrived in the morning to take Lokesh to his school bus. Shakuntala was gagged, and her hands were tied, while no other signs of resistance by other family members was noted. Sonia consumed insecticide and was found unconscious the next morning and admitted to hospital at Barwala. She was found to have a suicide note that stated she had killed her father because he did not love her.

The previous night, Sonia had brought Priyanka to the farmhouse from a hostel to celebrate her birthday. Firecrackers were set off at midnight and servants mentioned that they saw Sonia come down to the garage and take away an iron rod. Later at around 4.45 a.m IST, Sonia drove away in a Tata Sumo returning in a few minutes. The servants informed police that they suspected that she left to drop off her husband from the crime scene. When police investigated, traces of opium were found in the kheer (rice pudding) that the family had consumed at dinner.

== Family ==
Relu Ram Poonia was elected as a legislator to the Haryana Legislative Assembly from the Barwala constituency as an Independent candidate in 1996. He had funded the Lok Dal's publicity campaigns and there was speculation that he would run for the party but he contested the election as an independent candidate instead. After his election he provided support to the government formed by the Haryana Vikas Party headed by Chief Minister Bansi Lal. He was born into a poor family but earned his wealth through the marketing of bitumen and oil on the black market for industrial usage in the Faridabad area. He invested in agricultural land and built a mansion at his native village Litani. Using the wealth he had accumulated, he made charitable contributions to local groups. He was known to have had cordial relations with the politicians Chaudhary Devi Lal and Om Prakash Chautala.

Relu Ram had a son Sunil with his first wife Omi Devi and two daughters, Sonia and Priyanka ('Pammi'), with his second wife Krishna. Sunil was married to Shakuntla and they had a son Lokesh and two daughters Shivani and Preeti. Sonia was married to Sanjeev Kumar. It was reported that Relu Ram and his wife Krishna did not have a cordial relationship. Similarly, Sonia had disputes with her half brother Sunil over agricultural land of around 46 acres (19 ha) surrounding their farmhouse. This often resulted in heated debates between the two, and weeks before the murders Sonia had threatened Sunil with a revolver. After the murders, Relu Ram's brother Ram Singh Punia and his family moved into the farmhouse in 2004.

== Case ==
In May 2004, Sonia and her husband Sanjiv Kumar were found guilty of murdering Poonia and seven other members of his family by a District and Sessions Court. The motive behind the murders was ascertained to be a property dispute between Sonia and her half brother Sunil. The court sentenced both of them to death. Kumar's eight relatives including his father, mother, and brother were acquitted of the charges. Public prosecutor P. K. Sandhir mentioned that the case was difficult to argue as it was based on circumstantial evidence. A total of 66 witnesses were examined out of more than 109 listed.

The Punjab and Haryana High Court reduced the couple's death sentence to life imprisonment in 2005. The death sentence was later reinstated by the Supreme Court in 2007. In October 2007, the Governor of Haryana rejected the couple's plea for mercy. Thereafter, Sonia and Sanjeev filed a mercy petition with the President of India who, under section 72 (1) of the Constitution of India, can grant clemency. In February 2009 Sonia wrote to President Pratibha Patil pursuing a decision of their mercy petition. She requested that her mercy plea be rejected and that she be given the death sentence as imprisonment was becoming difficult for her. She wrote: "It is getting impossible to live like an insect in solitary confinement. My life is becoming horrible and giving me more and more pain by every second passing ... I don't have any means to live and want to die once rather than dying with each passing minute". Her letter was sent to the Ministry of Home Affairs wherein P. Chidambaram, then Home Minister, asked the President to reject her plea noting that "even though Sonia is a woman, considering the nature of her crime, she doesn't deserve sympathy." During the process, the couple remained imprisoned at the Ambala jail.

In April 2013, President Pranab Mukherjee rejected the clemency request. However, a civil rights group called the People’s Union for Democratic Rights (PUDR) filed a petition with the Supreme Court to withhold the death sentence citing delays in rejecting the mercy plea, which the court accepted. Justices P. Sathasivam and M. Y. Eqbal stayed the execution. Later in January 2014, the Supreme Court gave life terms to thirteen more death-row inmates on same grounds.
