= Pashupatinath Temple shooting =

Mandsaur, India, 23 July 1983

- Location: Mandsaur, India
- Date: 23 July 1983; 7:30 p.m. – 8:20 p.m. IST (UTC+05:30)
- Target: Pashupatinath Temple
- Attack type: Mass shooting Mass murder, spree shooting
- Weapon: Lee-Enfield bolt-action rifle
- Deaths: 15 (including the perpetrator)
- Injuries: 9
- Perpetrator: Ramesh Sharma

The Pashupatinath Temple shooting was a mass shooting that occurred at the Pashupatinath Temple and its surrounding area in Mandsaur, India on 23 July 1983. Ramesh Sharma, a 28-year-old police constable killed 14 people and wounded nine others, before he was shot and killed by police.

== Events ==
=== Preceding ===
On 23 July 1983, Ramesh Sharma was on guard duty at Pashupatinath temple on a round-the-clock vigil with four colleagues. He was said to have been acting normally during the day. 15 minutes before the shooting occurred, Sharma casually entered the tea shop adjacent to the temple, drank tea and shared photos of the temple.

=== Shooting ===
At about 7:30 p.m., Sharma entered a tea shop adjacent to the temple, armed with a Lee–Enfield rifle and his pockets filled with cartridges. He aimed his rifle at the shop owner's nephew, Pradeep, and asked him "Should I shoot you?", before killing him.

Sharma next shot at Rakesh Jain, owner of an idol shop at the temple, hitting him in the shoulder. While Jain stumbled into the nearby Hanuman temple, Motia Bai, owner of another shop in the area, started shouting at Sharma angrily. Sharma shot dead both Motia and her son Hari while he ate dinner, before turning his attention back to Jain. After taking off his shoes he entered the temple and shot Jain at point-blank range through his abdomen. Sharma then put his shoes back on and left.

Outside he was approached by another policeman posted at the temple that evening, Kanhaiyalal Dube, who wanted to calm him down. Before Dube could intervene, Sharma shot him dead. The gunman then entered the Pashupatinath temple where an aarti, attended by about 60 people, had just begun. Sharma fired a few shots at the pilgrims, wounding several of them, before shouting to halt the aarti, though the priest, Ramachandra Shukla, apparently unaware of what was going on, raised his hand to silence him. Sharma killed the priest by shooting him in his arm and head.

At around 7:45 p.m. Sharma left the temple area and headed towards the town, where he killed another seven people in the streets. Police by then had already been notified, but it took them another 40 minutes to stop the gunman. At about 8:20 p.m. Sharma was engaged by policeman Mewa Lai. He fired a shot at the officer that missed its target and killed an 18-year-old woman named Sakina. Mewa Lai then returned fire and killed Sharma with a shot in the chest.

Within 50 minutes Sharma had fired 34 rounds, killing 14 people and injuring nine others; one cartridge remained in the chamber of his rifle, while another 35 were found in his pockets.
