= 1998 Amman murders =

Familicide in Jordan

- Location: Amman, Jordan
- Date: 10 June 1998 c. 4:00 – c. 13:00 (AST)
- Target: Al-Qashash family and classmate
- Weapon: Pistol
- Deaths: 12
- Perpetrator: Saeed al-Qashash
- Motive: Financial gain through inheritance
- Convictions: Murder x12

On 10 June 1998, twelve people were killed in a mass shooting in Amman, Jordan. Eleven of the dead were members of the Qashash family. A relative, 19-year-old Saeed al-Qashash, was arrested two days later for the murders. He was found guilty of murder and executed in 1999.

The murders caused widespread shock in Jordan, which has nationally low crime rates. It was the deadliest familicide in modern Jordanian history.

== Murders ==
On 10 June 1998, over the course of nine hours, Saeed al-Qashash (Arabic: سعيد القشاش; also spelled Sa'id al-Qashash) killed his parents, six siblings a brother-in-law, a nephew, a niece, and a classmate at the Qashash family villa in the Al Bunayyat neighborhood southeast of Amman.

At about 4:00 a.m., Qashash took out the hidden pistol in his first floor bedroom and went downstairs to the ground floor, where his mother Thuria and his sister Karimeh were awake. Qashash lured Thuria from the kitchen into a basement room, where he fatally shot her in the back of the head. Karimeh overheard the noise and also entered the basement, where Qashash also shot her in the head. Qashash went back to the first floor and successively entered the shared bedroom of his sisters Insaf and Mervit and the bedroom of his brother Mostafa, killing all three with single gunshots to the head as they slept. In the parents' bedroom, Qashash encountered his father Amin, who was awake, shooting him twice in the chest and head.

At 10:00 a.m., Qashash's brother Mohammed entered the house and upon stepping through the front door, Mohammed was shot twice in the head in an ambush. Shortly after, Qashash's sister Wafa, accompanied by her husband Jamal al-Turk and their two toddler children, Zaid and Hala, arrived for a scheduled visit. Qashash greeted them normally and invited Wafa and Jamal into the salon living room. The couple were then both shot in the head, with Qashash also killing the two children at the front entrance. At 1:00 p.m., Qashash's friend Atta Shalan showed up unannounced to the home. Although Shalan was apparently unaware of the murders, Qashash killed him as well because he was a witness to Qashash's presence at the house.

Afterwards, Qashash called his the workplace of his father, telling them that he would be unable to attend his shift as a school bus driver due to illness. Qashash subsequently piled up the bodies in the basement and covered them in blankets and carpet before using his brother-in-law's car to drive to the market to buy bricks, cement, and sand, hiring a pick-up truck to transport the supplies to the house. For the next hours, Qashash mixed the cement and walled-in all eleven bodies in a section of the basement. He then cleaned the entire house with water and detergent to get rid of traces of blood.

On 11 June, at 14:00, Qashash informed another relative of the murders, claiming he had spent the night at a friend's house studying and discovered the crime scene upon returning in the morning. By this point, other relatives had noticed that none of the family could be found in person or reached by phone. Qashash and the relative then informed the Public Security Directorate, with Qashash blaming a gang for the murders. Qashash was immediately found suspicious as the sole surviving member of his family and arrested two days later, after Public Security found the bodies after demolishing the freshly made wall in the basement, which was not in the building's original architectural plan. Qashash confessed to the murders in police custody.

=== Motive ===
Qashash had failed his last year of high school in 1997 and recently completed the first of two Tawjihi repeat exams. His father had repeatedly threatened to throw Qashash out of the house in case of failure. The Associated Press reported that the other family members and his friend Atta Shalan had "all harassed him about his failures in school". However, Al Ra'i later reported that Qashash was primarily motivated by the belief that he would receive the entirety of the family's property, including the family home, his father's commercial business and his father's bus, in case of the deaths of his parents and all other heirs, having intended to forge ownership papers to sell the objects off to unsuspecting third parties.

The weapon used in the murders, a 7 mm pistol, was reported to have either been stolen the week prior to the attack from Amin al-Qashash, with 25 bullets bought separately, or purchased from an acquaintance of Saeed al-Qashash along with 30 bullets.

== Victims ==
- Thuria Abu Habib (ثريا أبو حبيب), 50, mother
- Amin Ahmed al-Qashash (أمين أحمد القشاش), 57 or 58, father
- Mohammed al-Qashash (محمد القشاش), 25, brother
- Mostafa al-Qashash (مصطفى القشاش), 14, brother
- Karimeh al-Qashash (كريمة القشاش), 23, sister
- Mervit al-Qashash (ميرفت القشاش), 21, sister
- Insaf al-Qashash (إنصاف القشاش), 24, sister
- Wafa al-Qashash (وفاء القشاش), 30, sister
- Jamal al-Turk (جمال الترك), 30, husband of Wafa, brother-in-law
- Zaid al-Turk (زيد الترك), 3 or 4, son of Wafa and Jamal, nephew
- Hala al-Turk (هالة الترك), 2, daughter of Wafa and Jamal, niece
- Atta Arif al-Shalan (عطا عارف الشعلان), 19, classmate

== Aftermath ==
The al-Qashash family members were interred at the Sahab Cemetery on 15 June 1998.

=== Trial and execution ===
On 30 November 1998, Qashash was convicted of 12 counts of premeditated murder following a one-day trial. He pleaded with Judge Mohammed Ajamieh to spare his life, but was sentenced to death. Qashash did not react to the sentence.

Qashash's death sentence was opposed by Amnesty International, which urged Crown Prince Hassan bin Talal to commute the sentence.

Qashash was executed by hanging on 6 June 1999 at Swaqa Prison, about 60 miles south of Amman. In his last statement, made minutes before the execution, Qashash asked for forgiveness and apologised for the murders. He was formally declared dead at 6:00 a.m. on 7 June. His body was not accepted by other relatives, who asked government authorities to handle the burial.

== See also ==
- List of familicides in Asia
