= Budhanwala =

- Village
- Location in Punjab, India Budhanwala (India)
- Coordinates: 31.052°N 75.341°E
- Country: India
- State: Punjab
- District: Jalandhar
- Tehsil: Shahkot

Government
  - Type: Panchayat raj
  - Body: Gram panchayat

Area
  - Total: 160.66 ha (397.0 acres)

Population (2011)
  - Total: 678; 329/349 ♂/♀
  - Scheduled Castes: 305; 159/146 ♂/♀
  - Total Households: 153

Languages
  - Official: Punjabi
- Time zone: UTC+5:30 (IST)
- ISO 3166 code: IN-PB
- Website: jalandhar.gov.in

Budhanwala is a village in Shahkot in Jalandhar district of Punjab State, India. It is located 4 kilometres (2.5 mi) from sub district headquarter and 46 kilometres (29 mi) from district headquarter. The village is administrated by a sarpanch, an elected representative of the village.

== Demography ==
In 2011, the village had 153 houses and a population of 678 (329 males and 349 females). According to the report published by Census India in 2011, of the total population of the village, 305 people were from Schedule Castes and the village did not have any Schedule Tribe population.

== See also ==
- List of villages in India
