= 1989 Tel Aviv murders =

Spree killing in Tel Aviv, Israel

- Location: Tel Aviv and Jaffa, Israel
- Date: 18/19 October 1989
- Attack type: Spree killing
- Weapon: Nylon rope
- Deaths: 7 civilians
- Injuries: 0
- Perpetrator: Mohammed Halabi

In October 1989, seven civilians were murdered in Tel Aviv, Israel. In what was described by Reuters as "Israel's worst multiple murder case," five women (three Jews and two Arabs) and two men (one Arab and one Jew) were strangled to death with a nylon rope in an apartment in Tel Aviv and in nearby Jaffa. According to Reuters, the victims were "mainly prostitutes, drug addicts and petty criminals." Their bodies were discovered on 20 October; police stated they had been killed 24 to 48 hours earlier.

On 20 November, 32-year-old Mohammed Halabi, a Palestinian informant who worked for the Israeli security agency Shin Bet, was arrested for the murders in his house at Khan Yunis in the Gaza Strip. Halabi confessed to police that he had killed the victims on orders from the Palestinian resistance movement, and that "collaborators" and prostitutes were among those he killed. However, Israel Radio stated that police believed that the victims were killed in an unrelated dispute.

On 25 January 1990, Halabi was sentenced to life imprisonment for the murders. The Tel Aviv District Court also sentenced him to 40 additional years in prison for two attempted murders.
