= Mass shooting =

Firearm violence incident

A mass shooting is a crime in which one or more attackers use gun(s) to kill or injure multiple individuals in rapid succession. Mass shootings with multiple deceased victims are a form of mass murder. There is no widely accepted specific definition of the term, and different organizations tracking such incidents use different criteria. Mass shootings are characterized by the targeting, often indiscriminate, of victims outside a combat setting, and the term generally excludes gang violence, shootouts, and self-defense. The perpetrator of an ongoing mass shooting may be referred to as an active shooter.

Mass shootings may be done for personal or psychological reasons, such as by individuals who are deeply disgruntled, seeking notoriety, or are intensely angry at a perceived grievance; though they have also been used as a terrorist tactic, such as when members of an ethnic or religious group are deliberately targeted. It has been theorized that media coverage of mass shootings has contributed to later shooters being motivated by fame-seeking. After mass shootings, mental health issues such as survivor's guilt and post-traumatic stress disorder are commonly suffered by survivors, first responders, and victims' loved ones.

The number of people killed in mass shootings is difficult to determine due to the lack of a commonly agreed upon definition. In the United States—the country with the most mass shootings—there were 103 deaths in mass shootings in 2021 (excluding the perpetrators) using the FBI's definition, and 706 deaths using the Gun Violence Archive's definition. Mass shootings are relatively rare in China, Singapore, South Korea, Japan, Europe, the United Kingdom, Russia, and across Africa.

Mass shootings perpetrated with legally purchased firearms often prompt scrutiny of and changes to local gun laws. For example, mass shootings in Dunblane, Port Arthur and Christchurch respectively contributed to significant expansions of firearm restrictions in the United Kingdom, Australia and New Zealand.

== Definitions ==
There are a variety of definitions of a mass shooting:

- Mass Shooting Tracker, a crowdsourced data site cited by CNN, MSNBC, The New York Times, The Washington Post, The Economist, the BBC, etc., defines a mass shooting as any incident in which four or more people are shot, whether injured or killed.
- CBS defines a mass shooting as an event involving the shooting (not necessarily resulting in death) of five or more people (sometimes four) with no cooling-off period.
- Mother Jones defines a mass shooting as an indiscriminate rampage in a public place, resulting in three or more victims (excluding the perpetrator) killed by the attacker, excluding gang violence, armed robbery, and attacks by unidentified perpetrators.
- Crime violence research group Gun Violence Archive, whose research is used by major American media outlets, defines a mass shooting as having a "minimum of four victims shot, either injured or killed, not including any shooter who may also have been killed or injured in the incident," differentiating between a mass shooting and mass murder and not counting shooters as victims.
- Media outlets such as CNN, and some crime violence research groups such as the Gun Violence Archive, define mass shootings as involving "four or more shot (injured or killed) in a single incident, at the same general time and location, not including the shooter".
- A Congressional Research Service report from 2013 specifies that a public mass shooting involves four or more killings on indiscriminate victims, while excluding violence committed as a means to an end, such as robbery or terrorism.
- An Australian study from 2006 specifies five individuals killed.

There are also different definitions of the term mass killing:

- Under U.S. federal law, the Attorney General – on a request from a state – may assist in investigating "mass killings", rather than mass shootings. The term is defined as the murder of four or more people with no cooling-off period, but was redefined by Congress in 2013 as being the murder of three or more people.
- In "Behind the Bloodshed", a report by USA Today, a mass killing is defined as any incident in which four or more were killed, including familial killings. This definition is also used by the Washington Post.
- According to the Investigative Assistance for Violent Crimes Act of 2012, signed into law in January 2013, a mass killing is defined as a killing with at least three deaths, excluding the perpetrator.

An act of mass shooting is typically defined as terrorist when it "appears to have been intended" to intimidate or to coerce people; although a mass shooting is not necessarily an act of terrorism solely by itself.

The lack of a single definition can lead to alarmism in the news media, with some reports conflating categories of different crimes.

The perpetrator is typically, but not always, excluded from the body count.

== Prevalence ==
The number of people killed in mass shootings is difficult to determine due to the lack of a commonly agreed definition. It is also difficult to determine whether their frequency is increasing or decreasing over time, for the same reason. In addition, there is a large impact from random chance, outliers, and the specific time frame chosen for analysis.

=== United States ===
A New York Times study reported how outcomes of active shooter attacks varied with actions of the attacker, the police (42% of total incidents), and bystanders (including a "good guy with a gun" outcome in 5.1% of total incidents).

Total deaths in U.S. mass shootings—defined as four or more people shot and killed in one incident, excluding the perpetrator, at a public place, excluding gang-related killings

The U.S. has substantially more mass shootings (in which four or more people are killed) than other developed countries. According to Vox, the U.S. gun homicide rate is as much as 26 times that of other high-income countries.

The United States has had the most mass shootings of any country in the world. There were 103 deaths in mass shootings in 2021 (excluding the perpetrators) using the FBI's definition, and 706 deaths using the Gun Violence Archive's definition. The FBI's definition refers to "active shooter incidents" defined as "one or more individuals actively engaged in killing or attempting to kill people in a populated area", while the Gun Violence Archive's definition counts incidents where at least four people (excluding the perpetrator) were shot, but not necessarily killed.

In a 2016 study published by criminologist Adam Lankford, it was estimated that 31 percent of all public mass shooters from 1966 to 2012 attacked in the United States, although the U.S. had less than five percent of the world's population. The study concludes that "The United States and other nations with high firearm ownership rates may be particularly susceptible to future public mass shootings, even if they are relatively peaceful or mentally healthy according to other national indicators."

Criminologist Gary Kleck criticized Lankford's findings, stating the study merely shows a proportional relationship but fails to prove that gun ownership causes mass shootings. The backlash from economist and gun rights advocate John Lott also raised objections to Lankford's methodology and refusal to share his data. He speculated that Lankford had overlooked a significant number of mass shootings outside the U.S., which if accounted for would adjust the nation's share closer to 2.88 percent; slightly below the world average. Lankford has since followed up on his research, publishing his data and clarifying that the United States from 1998 to 2012 did have more than six times its global share of public mass shooters who attacked alone, which is almost always the case with mass shooters. Using the data from Lott and Moody's 2019 study of mass shootings, Lankford explains that "41 of all 138 public mass shootings by single perpetrators worldwide were committed in the United States. That represents 29.7 percent. Because America had in those years approximately 4.5 percent of the world's population (according to Lott and Moody's calculations), this indicates that based on their data, the United States had more than six times its global share of public mass shooters who attacked alone (29.7/4.5 = 6.6). In a subsequent study, Lankford criticized Lott and Moody for including "attacks by terrorist organizations, genocidal militias, armed rebel groups, and paramilitary fighters" in their data and suggested they "misrepresent approximately 1,000 foreign cases from their own dataset" in other ways.

Mass shootings have also been observed to be followed by an increase in the purchase of weapons, but this does not seem to create an increased feeling of needing guns in either gun owners or non-owners.

Even though the global COVID-19 pandemic reduced public gatherings from March 2020 onward, the number of mass shootings increased significantly over that period. It "even doubled in July 2020 compared to a year earlier".

=== Other countries ===
- Mass shootings (and firearm deaths in general) are exceedingly rare in China, Singapore, South Korea, Japan and the United Kingdom. China's strict gun control laws have prohibited private ownership of firearms since 1951. Japan has as few as two gun-related homicides per year. These numbers include all homicides in the country, not just mass shootings.
- While gun violence is relatively uncommon in India due to strict gun control laws, incidents of mass shootings continue to occur.
- Mass shootings are relatively rare in Russia, but they have occurred sporadically over the past decade. Most of the incidents involve lone gunmen, although there have been a few cases involving multiple shooters.
- Mass shootings have become a common occurrence in Mexico, particularly in recent years. The country has been plagued by violence from drug cartels, which have been responsible for many of the deadliest mass shootings in Mexico's history.
- Brazil has one of the highest rates of gun violence in the world, and mass shootings have become more common in recent years. In 2022, there were at least 10 mass shootings in Brazil, resulting in the deaths of over 50 people. Furthermore, In 2017, there were over 45,000 gun-related homicides countrywide.
- In Africa, whilst incidents of mass violence resulting from terrorism and ethnic conflict have occurred, mass shootings are generally understood as rare.

== Victims and survivors ==
It is common for mass shooting survivors to suffer from post-traumatic stress disorder and survivors guilt. In 2019, Sydney Aiello and Calvin Desir, both survivors of the Parkland high school shooting, committed suicide as a result of survivors guilt; Aiello knew of a friend killed in the shooting.

After mass shootings, survivors frequently report persistent mental health effects; population-based and survivor studies have found elevated major depression and post-traumatic stress disorder, particularly among those with higher exposure and limited social support. In addition, studies have evaluated post-incident service use, noting variable awareness and uptake of mental health and other support services among affected communities. A survivor of the Knoxville Unitarian Universalist church shooting wrote about his reaction to other mass shooting incidents. The father of a victim in a mass shooting at a movie theater in Aurora, Colorado, wrote about witnessing other mass shootings after the loss of his son. The survivors of the 2011 Norway attacks recounted their experience to GQ magazine. In addition, one paper studied Swedish police officers' reactions to a mass shooting.

== Perpetrators ==
=== Sex and ethnicity ===
==== United States ====
The overwhelming majority of mass shooters in the U.S. are male, with some sources showing males account for 98 percent of mass shooters. According to Sky News, male perpetrators committed 110 out of 114 school shootings (96%) in the period 1982–2019, compared to homicides in general in the United States, where 85.3 percent of homicides were committed by males.

A study by Statista showed that 65 out of 116 (56%) U.S. mass shootings in a period from 1982 to 2019 involved white shooters (who are 65% of the population). According to a database compiled by Mother Jones magazine, the race of the shooters is approximately proportionate to the overall U.S. population, although Asians are overrepresented and Latinos underrepresented.

=== Mental health ===
In a study of 55 mass shooters from Mother Jones' mass shooting database, researchers found that 87.5 percent of perpetrators had misdiagnosed and incorrectly treated or undiagnosed and untreated psychiatric illnesses.

According to a study by The Violence Project, 42 percent of all mass shooters experienced physical or sexual abuse, childhood trauma, parental suicide, or were victims of bullying. They also found that 72 percent of perpetrators were suicidal.

In a study of 171 mass shooters who attacked in the United States from 1966 to 2019, researchers Adam Lankford and Rebecca Cowan found that although the vast majority of people with mental illness are not violent, "almost all public mass shooters may have mental health problems." They suggest the frequency of mental health problems among mass shooters is sometimes underestimated because "many perpetrators have never been formally evaluated by a psychiatrist or mental health practitioner...and others deliberately avoid doctors, conceal their mental health problems, or lie about their symptoms due to shame, stigma, or fear of other consequences." However, Lankford and Cowan also emphasize that mental illness is not the sole cause of mass shootings and many other factors play an important role in perpetrators' decisions to attack.

=== Criminal records ===
Criminologist James Allen Fox said that most mass murderers do not have a criminal record, or involuntary incarceration at a mental health centre, although according to a December 2015 article in The New York Times about 15 recent mass shootings found that six perpetrators had had run-ins with law enforcement, and six had mental health issues.

=== Motives ===
Mass shootings (that occur in public locations) are usually committed by deeply disgruntled individuals who are seeking revenge as a motive, for failures in school, career, romance, or life in general. Additionally, or alternately, they could be seeking fame or attention, and at least 16 mass shooters since the Columbine massacre have cited fame or notoriety as a motive. Fame-seeking mass shooters kill on average more than twice as many people as mass shooters who are not fame-seeking. Many of the former articulate a desire to surpass "past records".

Mass shootings can be motivated by religious extremism, political ideologies (e.g., neo-Nazism, Communism, terrorism, white supremacism), racism, misogyny, homophobia, perpetrator suicidality, mental illness, and revenge against bullying, among other reasons. Forensic psychologist Stephen Ross cites extreme anger and the notion of working for a cause – rather than mental illness – as primary explanations. A study by Vanderbilt University researchers found that "fewer than five percent of the 120,000 gun-related killings in the United States between 2001 and 2010 were perpetrated by people diagnosed with mental illness." John Roman of the Urban Institute argues that, while better access to mental health care, restricting high powered weapons, and creating a defensive infrastructure to combat terrorism are constructive, they do not address the greater issue, which is "we have a lot of really angry young men in our country and in the world."

Author Dave Cullen, in his 2009 book Columbine on the 1999 Columbine High School massacre and its perpetrators Eric Harris and Dylan Klebold, described Harris as an "injustice collector." He expanded on the concept in a 2015 New Republic essay on injustice collectors, identifying several notorious killers as fitting the category, including Christopher Dorner, Elliot Rodger, Vester Flanagan, and Andrew Kehoe. Likewise, mass shooting expert and former FBI profiler Mary O'Toole also uses the phrase "injustice collector" in characterizing motives of some mass shooting perpetrators. In relation, criminologist James Alan Fox contends that mass murderers are "enabled by social isolation" and typically experience "years of disappointment and failure that produce a mix of profound hopelessness and deep-seated resentment." Jillian Peterson, an assistant professor of criminology at Hamline University who is participating in the construction of a database on mass shooters, noted that two phenomena surface repeatedly in the statistics: hopelessness and a need for notoriety in life or in death. Notoriety was first suggested as a possible motive and researched by Justin Nutt. Nutt stated in a 2013 article, "those who feel nameless and as though no one will care or remember them when they are gone may feel doing something such as a school shooting will make sure they are remembered and listed in the history books."

In considering the frequency of mass shootings in the United States, criminologist Peter Squires says that the individualistic culture in the United States puts the country at greater risk for mass shootings than other countries, noting that "many other countries where gun ownership is high, such as Norway, Finland, Switzerland and Israel...tend to have more tight-knit societies where a strong social bond supports people through crises, and mass killings are fewer." He is an advocate of gun control, but contends there is more to mass shootings than the prevalence of guns. The Italian Marxist academic Franco Berardi argues that the hyper-individualism, social alienation and competitiveness fomented by neoliberal ideology and capitalism creates mass shooters by causing people to "malfunction."

=== Social science and family structure ===
A noteworthy connection has been reported in the U.S. between mass shootings and domestic or family violence, with a current or former intimate partner or family member killed in 76 of 133 cases (57%), and a perpetrator having previously been charged with domestic violence in 21.

== Responses ==
=== Media ===
Some people have considered whether media attention revolving around the perpetrators of mass shootings is a factor in sparking further incidents. In response to this, some in law enforcement have decided against naming mass shooting suspects in media-related events to avoid giving them notoriety.

The effects of messages used in the coverage of mass shootings have been studied. Researchers studied the role the coverage plays in shaping attitudes toward persons with serious mental illness and public support for gun control policies.

In 2015, a paper written by a physicist and statistician, Sherry Towers, along with four colleagues was published, which proved that there is indeed mass shooting contagion using mathematical modeling. However, in 2017, Towers said in an interview that she prefers self-regulation to censorship to address this issue, just like years ago major news outlets successfully prevent copycat suicide.

In 2016, the American Psychological Association published a press release, claiming that mass shooting contagion does exist and that news media and social media enthusiasts should withhold the name(s) and face(s) of the victimizer(s) when reporting a mass shooting to deny the fame the shooter(s) want to curb contagion.

Some news media have weighed in on the gun control debate. After the 2015 San Bernardino attack, the New York Daily News' front-page headline "God isn't fixing this" was accompanied by "images of tweets from leading Republicans who shared their 'thoughts' and 'prayers' for the shooting victims." Since the 2014 Isla Vista killings, satirical news website The Onion has repeatedly republished the story "No Way to Prevent This", Says Only Nation Where This Regularly Happens with minor edits after major mass shootings, to satirise the popular consensus that there is a lack of political power in the United States to prevent mass shootings.

=== Gun law reform ===
Responses to mass shootings take a variety of forms, depending on the country and political climate.

==== Australia ====
After the 1996 Port Arthur massacre, Australia changed its gun laws.

==== New Zealand ====
In the aftermath of the Christchurch mosque shootings, New Zealand announced a ban on almost all semiautomatic military-style weapons.

==== United Kingdom ====
Mass shootings are extremely rare in the United Kingdom, which has some of the strictest gun laws in the world. As a result of the Hungerford massacre in Hungerford, England, and the Dunblane school massacre in Stirling, Scotland, the United Kingdom enacted tough gun laws and a buyback program to remove specific classes of firearms from private ownership. They included the Firearms Amendment Act 1988, which limited rifles and shotguns; and the 1997 Firearms Amendment Acts, which restricted or made illegal many handguns. Since then, there have been only a handful of mass shootings in the country with relatively few fatalities. The UK has also banned the private ownership of semi-automatic and automatic weapons, and introduced stringent checks before issuing permits to private citizens to own single and low cartridge shotguns. There have been two mass shootings since the laws were restricted: the Cumbria shootings in 2010, which killed 13 people, including the perpetrator; and the Plymouth shooting in 2021, which killed six people, including the perpetrator.

==== United States ====
In the United States, support for gun law reform varies considerably by political party, with Democrats generally more supportive and Republicans generally more opposed. Some in the U.S. believe that tightening gun laws would prevent future mass shootings. Some politicians in the U.S. introduced legislation to reform the background check system for purchasing a gun. A vast majority of Americans support tighter background checks. "According to a poll by Quinnipiac University in Connecticut, 93 percent of registered voters said they would support universal background checks for all gun buyers."

Others contend that mass shootings should not be the main focus in the gun law reform debate because these shootings account for less than one percent of the U.S. homicide rate and believe that these shootings are hard to stop. They often argue that civilians with concealed guns will be able to stop shootings.

According to British criminologist Peter Squires, who has studied gun violence in different countries, mass shootings may be more due to the "individualistic culture" in the U.S. than its firearm laws.

U.S. President Barack Obama repeatedly addressed mass shootings during his eight-year presidency, calling for more gun safety laws in the United States. After the Charleston church shooting, and the Stoneman Douglas High School shooting, he renewed his call for reforming gun-safety laws and said that the frequency of mass shootings in the United States has "no parallel in the world." After the Stoneman Douglas High School shooting, the surviving students, teachers, and parents became leaders in the effort to ban assault weapon sales and easy accessibility to weapons.

==== Mexico ====
The ongoing violence in Mexico has prompted the government to take action to try to address the issue. In recent years, the government has implemented various measures, including increasing security forces, deploying the military to high-risk areas, and tightening gun control laws. Despite these efforts, mass shootings in Mexico continue to be prominent in the country, and the country remains one of the most violent in the world according to some.

== Examples ==
=== Africa ===
Mass shootings in Africa include the 1927 Charlestown shootings in South Africa, the 2016 Grand-Bassam shootings in Ivory Coast, and the 2013 Bombo shooting in Uganda.

In Egypt, shootings include both the 1997 Luxor massacre and the 2013 Meet al-Attar shooting.

In Kenya, on 2 April 2015, armed terrorists stormed a public university in the North Eastern part of the country and killed 148 people.

=== Asia ===
==== East Asia ====
Mass shootings in China include the 1993 Chongqing shooting, the 1994 Tian Mingjian incident and the 2013 Shanghai shooting.

Japan has had several mass shootings, including the 1938 Tsuyama massacre, the 2007 Sasebo shooting, and the 2010 Habikino shooting.

In South Korea, the deadliest mass shooting is the Woo Bum-kon incident in 1982, in which 56 people were killed. For many years, it remained the deadliest mass shooting in modern history until it was surpassed by the 2011 Norway attacks.

==== South and Southeast Asia ====
In India, during the 2008 Mumbai attacks, 10 gunmen affiliated with the terrorist group Lashkar-e-Taiba attacked multiple targets in Mumbai, killing 175 people and injuring hundreds more. The attack lasted for four days and one of the perpetrators was sentenced to death. Other notable incidents include the 2001 Indian Parliament attack, in which five gunmen attacked the parliament building in New Delhi, killing nine people, and the 2016 Pathankot attack, in which militants attacked an Indian Air Force base in Pathankot, killing seven security personnel. Mass shootings have also occurred in the context of regional conflicts. For example, the 2014 Chhattisgarh attack involved Naxalite militants attacking a convoy of political leaders and security personnel, killing 15 people, while the 2021 Sukma-Bijapur attack involved Naxalite rebels attacking security forces, resulting in the deaths of at least 22 security personnel. Other examples include the 1983 Pashupatinath Temple shooting.

In Nepal, the Nepalese royal massacre occurred in 2001.

In Thailand, a mass shooting occurred near and in Nakhon Ratchasima, colloquially known as Korat, between 8 and 9 February 2020. A soldier of the Royal Thai Army killed 30 people and wounded 58 others before he was eventually shot and killed. On 6 October 2022, 38 people, 24 of them children, were killed in a shooting and stabbing spree by a former police officer. The main target was a childcare centre in Nong Bua Lamphu province. The perpetrator then killed both his wife and son at his own home before committing suicide. Other mass shootings that occurred in Thailand are the Pak Phanang school shooting, the Lopburi mall shooting, the Siam Paragon shooting, and the Nonthaburi shootings.

Mass shootings in Pakistan include the 1948 Babrra massacre, and the 2014 Peshawar school massacre in which 149 people were killed.

==== Israel ====
Notable mass shootings in Israel include the 1972 Lod Airport massacre, which killed 26 and injured 80, the 2002 Hadera attack in Hadera, the 2008 Jerusalem yeshiva attack at Mercaz HaRav, the 2014 Jerusalem synagogue attack in Jerusalem, the June 2016 Tel Aviv shooting at the popular Sarona centre complex in Tel Aviv, and the Nova music festival massacre, part of the larger 7 October attacks, which led to the death of 364 of the participants in 2023. Other notable mass shootings include the 2005 Shilo shooting, and the 2013 Beersheba bank shooting. In April 2022, a mass shooting occurred on Dizengoff Street in Tel Aviv, in which a Palestinian gunman killed three civilians and injured six. In January 2023, a Palestinian gunman killed at least seven civilians in the Israeli settlement of Neve Yaakov in occupied East Jerusalem. The suspect is also reported to have shot at worshippers exiting a synagogue and was shot and killed by police officers.

=== Europe ===
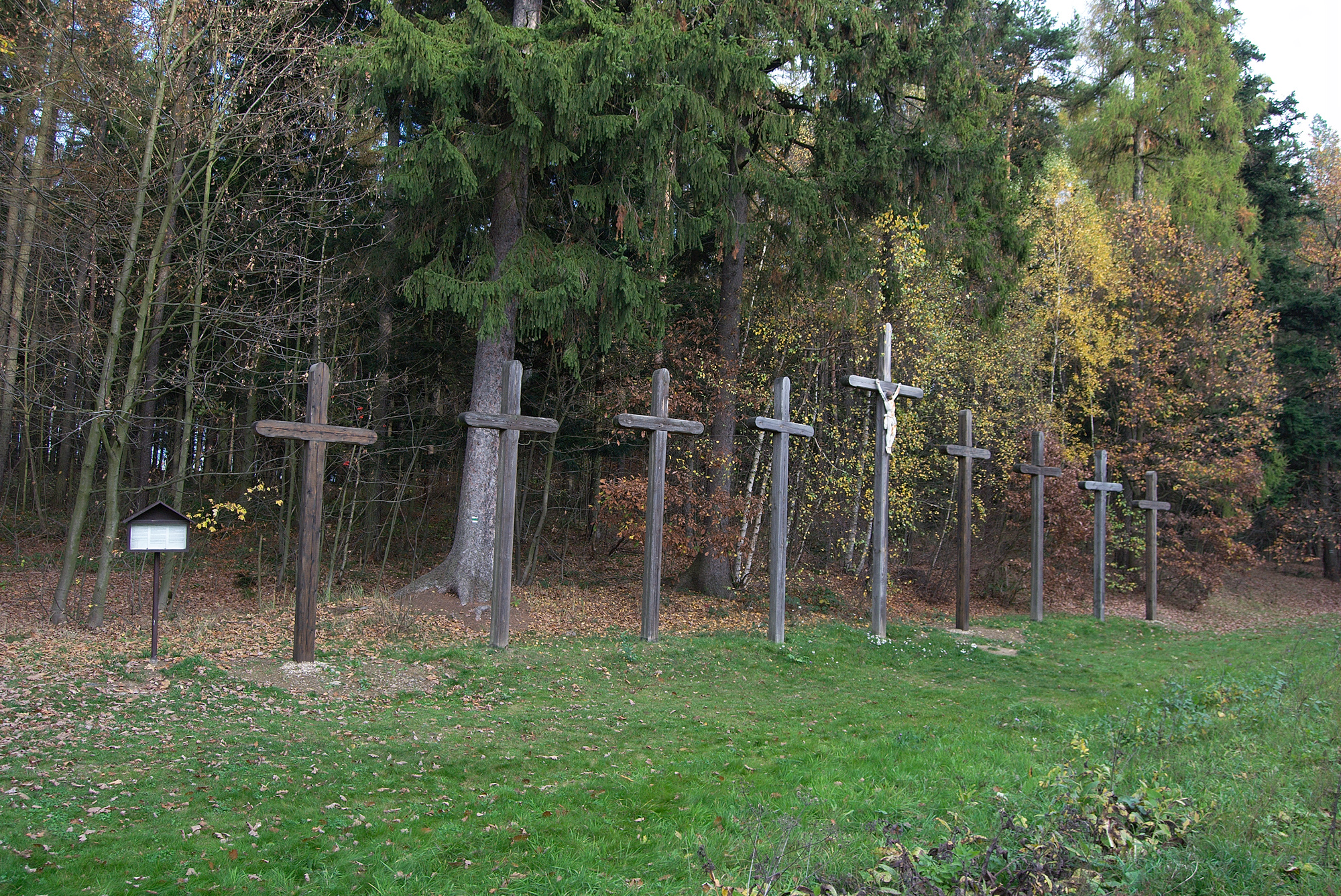
Nine Crosses, place of the first mass shooting on the territory of the current Czech Republic (1540)

The deadliest mass shooting by a lone individual in modern history occurred in Europe with the 2011 Norway attacks in Norway, in which 77 people were killed. Of those killed, 67 died of gunshot wounds.

In the United Kingdom, on 19 August 1987, in Hungerford, England, a man killed his mother before killing 16 people and injuring 15 others. On 13 March 1996, in Dunblane, Scotland, a man entered a primary school and opened fire, killing 16 children and one teacher before committing suicide. On 12 August 2021, in Plymouth, England, a man killed five people and injured two others before taking his own life. Other mass shootings in the UK include the Cumbria shootings on 2 June 2010, in which a man killed 12 people and injured 11 others before committing suicide; the Wallasey pub shooting, where 1 person was killed and 4 others injured; and the Monkseaton shootings, where 1 person was killed and 16 others injured.

In Germany, the Erfurt school massacre on 26 April 2002 was inspired by the Columbine High School massacre. Former student Robert Steinhäuser killed 16 people, including two students, 11 teachers, a trainee teacher, a secretary and a police officer, before killing himself. On 13 March 2009, the Winnenden shootings occurred in Winnenden and Wendlingen when Tim Kretschmer killed 15 people, including nine students, three teachers, and three bystanders, before killing himself. On 22 July 2016, nine people killed and 36 others were injured in a shooting at a mall in Munich. The gunman, David Sonboly, had far-right political motives. On 9 October 2019, a shooting took place in Halle when neo-Nazi Stephan Balliet, armed with several 3D-printed firearms and homemade explosive devices, tried to force his way into a synagogue during the Jewish holiday of Yom Kippur. When he was unable to get inside, he killed a female passerby before attacking a doner shop, killing a man inside. The entire shooting was live streamed on Twitch. Balliet was later arrested and charged with murder and attempted murder. Later, on 19 February 2020, two shisha bars were atacked in Hanau, killing nine people. The perpetrator, Tobias Rathjen then killed his mother at their shared home before committing suicide. Rathjen had a history of mental illness and far-right extremist views, expressing his hatred for immigrants and called for the extermination of several ethnic groups in a manifesto.

In the Czech Republic, the first mass shooting in its independent history occurred on 8 March 2009, when a 42-year-old North Macedonian national named Raif Kačar opened fire at the Sokol Restaurant in Petřvald, killing four. Kačar then shot himself and died four days later as a result of his injuries. The pistol used in the shooting was obtained illegally. A second mass shooting occurred on 24 February 2015, when a 62-year-old man named Zdeněk Kovář, who was legally armed with a CZ 75B and an Alfa 820 revolver, entered the Družba restaurant in Uherský Brod and started shooting. Nine people, including Kovář who committed suicide, died in the shooting, and one other person was injured. The police received criticism for its response to the shooting. This incident was the deadliest mass shooting in Czech history until the 2023 Prague shootings. On 10 December 2019, when 42-year-old Ctirad Vitásek, illegally armed with a CZ 75B, opened fire at the traumatology room of the Ostrava University Hospital, killing seven and injuring two. Vitásek then fled the scene and committed suicide near the town of Děhylov after being discovered by the police. On 21 December 2023, 24-year-old David Kozák, a world history student at Charles University who was also a legal owner of several firearms, murdered his father at his home in Hostouň and later opened fire at the Faculty of Arts building of the Charles University in Prague. 16 people, including Kozák's father and Kozák himself, who committed suicide at the rooftop terrace of the building, died in the shootings. 25 people were wounded. This was the first case of a school shooting in Czech Republic's history. Kozák had brought several firearms with himself into the school, a Glock 47 pistol, a SIG Sauer P322 semi-automatic pistol and an AR-10–style rifle, which he used in the shooting and a pump-action shotgun, which he used to commit suicide. Police later reported that Kozák was one of the many suspects in a case of a double-murder of an infant and her father at Klánovice Forest near Prague, which occurred on 15 December 2023, Police also later announced that evidence linking Kozák to the double-murder has been found. On 27 December 2023, it was reported that police found a letter in Kozák's home, in which he confessed to the double-murder. The Prague shootings are currently the deadliest mass shooting in the Czech Republic's history.

In France, On 13–14 November 2015, a series of religiously motivated mass shootings and suicide bombings occurred in Paris leading to the death of 130 people and 7 out of the 9 perpetrators. A few hours after the attacks, the Brussels Islamic State terror cell claimed to be behind the attacks. Less than a year prior to the Paris attacks, a shooting at Charlie Hebdo headquarters in Paris was perpetrated by two brothers, Chérif and Saïd Kouachi, on 7 January 2015. The shooting targeted the employees of Charlie Hebdo after they posted a satirical magazine article on the prophet Muhammad. The shooting lead to the deaths of 12 people and 11 others were injured. The brothers were shot and killed by a GIGN team two days after the attack during a standoff.

==== Russia and post-Soviet states ====
The deadliest shooting in Russia occurred on 8 October 1999, when Achmed Ibragimov killed at least 34 Russian inhabitants in the village of Mikenskaya. Other shootings include the Moscow Multifunctional Center shooting on 7 December 2021, where a 45-year-old man shot and killed two people and wounded four others, reportedly after being told to put on a face mask. In the Perm State University shooting on 20 September 2021, Timur Bekmansurov fatally shot six people before being apprehended by police. In another incident on 26 September 2022, 18 people were killed in a school shooting in Izhevsk, Udmurtia. One of the largest shootings involving military personnel occurred on 15 October 2022, at the Soloti military training ground in Belgorod Oblast. Two conscripts from Tajikistan committed friendly fire, killing 11 people before being killed by return fire.

In Ukraine, on 27 January 2022, a gunman opened fire at the Yuzhmash factory in the city of Dnipro. The attack left five people dead and five others injured. The shooter, a former employee of the factory, was reportedly disgruntled over his dismissal and had been seeking revenge. Another notable incident of mass shooting in Ukraine took place on 17 October 2018, when Vladislav Roslyakov, an 18-year-old student at the Kerch Polytechnic College in Crimea, which was annexed by Russia in 2014, opened fire on his fellow students and teachers, killing 20 and injuring more than 70 others. The shooter committed suicide in the library at the school. The perpetrator is believed to have been inspired by Columbine.

=== North America ===
Notable mass shootings in Canada include the 1989 École Polytechnique massacre (which led to stronger gun control in Canada), the 1992 Concordia University massacre, the 2006 Dawson College shooting in Montreal, the 2012 Danzig Street shooting, the 2014 Edmonton shooting, the 2017 Quebec City mosque shooting, the 2018 Toronto shooting, the 2020 Nova Scotia attacks, and the 2026 Tumbler Ridge shooting. Following the attacks in Nova Scotia, collectively considered to be the deadliest mass shooting in Canadian history, Prime Minister Justin Trudeau banned the use, sale, purchase, and import of AR-15s – the semi-automatic rifle used in the shooting and many other shootings in the United States.

Notable mass shootings in Mexico include the 2010 Chihuahua shootings in the state of Chihuahua. One of the deadliest mass shootings in Mexico occurred in 2010 in the town of San Fernando, Tamaulipas. In that incident, 72 migrants from Central and South America were found dead in a ranch, allegedly killed by members of the Zetas drug cartel. 2 months prior to that, 19 people were killed in Chihuahua in another shooting. Another high-profile mass shooting in Mexico took place in 2009, when a man opened fire on passengers on a Mexico City metro train, killing two people and injuring several others. In 2019, about 70 miles (110 km) south of the Mexico–United States border, the LeBarón and Langford families endured a massacre in the state of Sonora, where nine women and children were killed by suspected members of a drug cartel. The victims were believed to have been mistaken for members of a rival cartel. Other notable mass shootings in Mexico include the Minatitlán massacre in 2019, the Salamanca nightclub shooting in 2019, and the 2019 Villa Unión shootout. In 2020, the country experienced several high-profile mass shootings, including the Colegio Cervantes shooting in Torreón, the Irapuato massacres, and the Camargo massacre. On 23 May 2022, 11 people were killed in a mass shooting at the Gala Hotel and a nearby bar in Celaya, Guanajuato. The attackers were reportedly from the Santa Rosa de Lima Cartel, and left a message referring to the Jalisco New Generation Cartel and three dismembered bodies found earlier that day. On 27 March 2022, 20 people were killed in a mass shooting at an illegal cockfighting pit in Las Tinajas, Zinapécuaro, Michoacán. The attackers were believed to be from the Jalisco New Generation Cartel, and the massacre was part of a conflict between the cartel and the local gang Familia Michoacana. On 24 August 2022, eight people were killed in the city of Tuzantla, Michoacán, in a firefight between rival factions of La Familia Michoacana. The dispute stemmed from infighting between brothers Johnny "El Pez" and Jose Alfredo "El Fresa" Hurtado Olascoaga, leaders of the Tuzantla cell, and their former coworker known as "El Chaparro".

==== United States ====
On August 1, 1966, at the University of Texas in Austin, 25-year-old Marine veteran Charles Whitman killed 15 people, including an unborn child, and injured 31 others in the University of Texas tower shooting Whitman was killed by 2 Austin Police Department officers approximately 96 minutes after he began firing from the observation deck of the Main Building tower. In the 1999 Columbine High School massacre, two students from the school shot and killed 13 classmates, including a victim who died in 2025, and a teacher before committing suicide in the school's library. On April 16, 2007, 23-year-old student Seung-Hui Cho killed 32 students and teachers, and wounded 17 others in the Virginia Tech shooting. Other people were injured attempting to escape. When police stormed the building he was in, the shooter killed himself. In the Sandy Hook Elementary School shooting, 20-year-old Adam Lanza killed his mother before shooting and killing 20 children and 6 adults at Sandy Hook Elementary School in Newtown, Connecticut. He then committed suicide; the motive is still inconclusive. On May 24, 2022, in Uvalde, Texas, 18-year-old Salvador Ramos shot and wounded his grandmother before he drove to his former elementary school, Robb Elementary School, and opened fire. Ramos targeted adjoining classrooms 111 and 112. He killed 19 children and 2 teachers before being shot dead by police around 77 minutes after Ramos entered the classrooms. Eighteen other people were hospitalized as a result of the Uvalde school shooting.

On June 17, 2015, 21-year-old white-supremacist Dylann Roof killed 9 African Americans, including senior pastor and state senator Clementa C. Pinckney, in the Charleston Church Shooting. Roof left the scene and a manhunt began before he was apprehended the next morning. He later confessed to attacking the historic black church in an attempt to start a race war. Roof is currently imprisoned at USP Terre Haute where he awaits his death sentence. On June 12, 2016, 29-year-old Omar Mateen killed 49 people and wounded 53 others in the Pulse nightclub shooting. Mateen was killed in a shootout with the police. On October 1, 2017, 64-year-old Stephen Paddock killed 60 people and wounded hundreds more in the 2017 Las Vegas shooting. Paddock died from a self-inflicted gunshot wound before police entered his hotel room. On May 14, 2022, Payton Gendron killed 10 people and injured 3 in the 2022 Buffalo shooting. Gendron wrote in a lengthy manifesto that he was radicalized after having "extreme boredom" during the COVID-19 pandemic, when he began browsing 4chan and neo-Nazi websites linked from it; the accused gunman's manifesto espoused notions from the "Great Replacement" conspiracy theory and included screenshots of memes and conservative news headlines that he cited as sources for his ideology.

=== South America ===
Notable mass shootings in Argentina include the 2004 Carmen de Patagones school shooting in Carmen de Patagones, the 2006 San Miguel shooting, a workplace attack in a suburb of Buenos Aires, and the June 2006 mass shooting on Cabildo Avenue in Belgrano, Buenos Aires, committed by serial shooter Martín Ríos.

Notable mass shootings in Brazil include:

- Suzano school shooting (2019): Two former students killed 7 people and injured 11 others at Raul Brasil State School in Suzano, São Paulo before killing themself. The perpetrators also killed one of their uncles before the school shooting.
- Realengo school shooting (2011): A gunman killed 12 students and injured 22 others at Tasso da Silveira Municipal School in Realengo, Rio de Janeiro before committing suicide.
- Fortaleza nightclub shooting (2018): A man killed 14 people at a nightclub in Fortaleza
- Campinas Cathedral shooting (2018): A man killed five people and injured 4 others at the Metropolitan Cathedral of Campinas in Campinas, São Paulo. Police shot the gunman on his side before he killed himself.
- Aracruz school shootings (2022): On 25 November 2022, a 16-year-old neo-nazi former student opened fire at two schools in Brazil, killing four and injuring 12.

=== Oceania ===
Notable mass shootings in Australia include the 1987 Hoddle Street massacre in Hoddle Street, Clifton Hill, Melbourne; the 1996 Port Arthur massacre in Port Arthur, Tasmania; and the 2025 Bondi Beach shooting in Sydney, New South Wales. There were 13 mass shootings with five or more deaths between 1979 and 1996, and four mass shootings involving four or more deaths have occurred since the introduction of new gun laws following the Port Arthur incident. On 4 June 2019, a 45-year-old gunman began shooting at multiple locations in Darwin, Australia, resulting in the death of four people and the injury of one other person. The gunman was sentenced to three life sentences without the possibility of parole, with an additional 15-year sentence. The 2022 Wieambilla shootings was a religiously motivated terrorist attack that resulted in the death of two police officers and a neighbour, as well as the fatal shooting of the three perpetrators. The shooting lasted six hours. The motive was found to be Christian fundamentalism.

New Zealand has a relatively low rate of gun violence compared to other developed countries despite its formerly lax gun laws. The country has experienced three major mass shootings since the late 20th century. The first mass shooting occurred in Aramoana, a small town on the east coast of the South Island, in 1990. David Gray, a 33-year-old man with a history of mental illness, killed 13 people and injured three others before being shot and killed by police. The second mass shooting occurred in Christchurch, the largest city in southern New Zealand, in 2019. Brenton Tarrant, a 28-year-old Australian-born man, opened fire on two mosques during Friday prayers, killing 51 people and injuring 40 others. This was the worst mass shooting in New Zealand history. The third mass shooting occurred in Auckland, the largest city in the North Island. Matu Tangi Magua Reid, who was under house arrest killed two people and injured 10 others during a workplace shooting before killing himself.

== See also ==
- Category:Mass shootings by country
- Active shooter
- Copycat crime
- Domestic terrorism
- Definition of terrorism
- List of manifestos of mass killers
- Mass murder
- School shooting
