= Kawachi massacre =

1893 mass murder in Osaka Prefecture, Japan

- Native name: 河内十人斬り
- Location: Suibun, Kawachi Province, Empire of Japan
- Date: 25 May 1893
- Target: Morimoto and Matsunaga families
- Attack type: Sword attack, shooting
- Weapons: Katana; Swordstick; Murata rifle
- Deaths: 11 (10 by slashing, 1 by gunshot)
- Perpetrators: Kumatarō Kido; Yagorō Tani
- Motive: Revenge for humiliation from cuckolding and extortion

On 25 May 1893, eleven people were killed in a shooting and sword attack in Suibun, a village of Chihayaakasaka, Osaka Prefecture, Japan.

The perpetrators, 36-year-old Kumatarō Kido (城戸 熊太郎, Kido Kumatarō) and 26-year-old Yagorō Tani (谷 弥五郎, Tani Yagorō), had targeted Kido's wife Onui Morimoto and the family of her lover, Torakichi Matsunaga, over the infidelity and financial defrauding through Matsunaga and his father Denjirō. The victims ultimately included Morimoto, her mother, and most of Denjirō Matsunaga's immediate family, although Torakichi ultimately survived. Following a two-week manhunt, Kido and Tani committed suicide while hiding in nearby Mount Kongō.

The killings became known as Kawachi Ten-Person Sword Slayings (河内十人斬り, Kawachi Jūningiri), a name that remained in use even after an eleventh person died of their injuries. Locally, it was dubbed the Suibun Disturbance (水分騒動, Suibun Sōdō).

== Background ==
Kido had entered a common-law marriage with Onui Morimoto, but she had left him in favor of his rival Torakichi Matsunaga. His father Denjirō Matsunaga had assaulted Kido, and had obtained part of Kido's money by fraud. Kido decided to kill the entire Matsunaga family, and he recruited his pupil Tani as an assistant for the revenge scheme.

== Circumstances of the crimes ==
=== Attacks ===
On 25 May 1893, armed with several swords and a hunting rifle, Kido and Tani first went to the residence of Denjirō Matsunaga. After luring Denjirō out with knocking and a gunshot, Denjirō, his wife Take, and two of their younger children, Sagorō and Sue, were killed with several slash wounds before the house was set on fire. Afterwards, Kido and Tani fatally shot Kido's mother-in-law Otaro Morimoto at her home. Kido found his wife Onui nearby, having walked outside after noticing the fire, and after injuring her during an attack attempt, Kido killed Onui as she hid in a barn. Onui's sister Uno was present, but spared after Kido threatened to kill her unless she ran. They went ot the house of Denjirō's eldest son Kumajirō Matsunaga, killing Kumajirō, his wife Rie, and their three children, Kyūtarō, Kōtarō, and Harue. Kido and Tani fled into the mountainside amidst the initial confusion, with Kido having sustained three cuts to his right hand. Due to his known feud with the Matsunaga family, Kido was quickly named as one of the attackers, with Tani identified shortly after when his absence was noted. Torakichi Matsunaga had been out of town for a work-related trip to Uji.

=== Manhunt ===
On 26 May, police officers from Tondabayashi, judicial officers of Osaka District Court, and an official of Osaka Prefectural Police arrived in Suibun for the investigation. At 23:00 that same day, Kido and Tani showed up at a relative's home in Nikarawabe, though only the relative's wife was present. The men asked her to cook rice for them, which she refused to do, after which they ate rice porridge she had already cooked before their arrival before leaving. On 27 May, Uno Morimoto heard someone knock on her door, but the person disappeared as she went to look.

In the midday hours of 28 May, 147 officers of Minami Osaka Police Station, as well as those of the towns of Higashiōsaka, and Sakai, were mobilized to search the area for the fugitives, discovering traces of them at various charcoal kilns in Nikarawabe, including bloodied discarded waraji sandals. At around 17:00, Kido and Tani threatened a woodcutter at gunpoint, with the incident reported and leading to a concentrated search effort in Nikarawabe. At 19:00, Kido and Tani took two sawyers hostage inside a hut, saying they would stay until the following day. Kido acknowledged that he and Tani were wanted for the murders three days earlier, saying he planned to kill another four or five people, but would leave anyone whom he did not have grudge against alone. Kido also stated that while he ruled out allowing himself to be captured, he planned to either kill himself or surrender to authorities after killing his remaining targets. After around nine hours, Kido and Tani forced their hostages to make one shō (equivalent to 1.8 litres) of rice and before leaving, Kido insisted he pay with a 20 sen coin, which he threw at the sawyers when they declined.

On 30 May, police were observing the house of Tatsujirō Nitta, another relative of Kido, when someone outside shouted "Big brother! Big brother!" ("兄貴兄貴"). The person could not be tracked down, but the Nitta family identified the voice as Kido. On 31 May, while the Buddhist memorial service for the victims was held, Kido and Tani returned to Suibun and visited the house of Takizō Akamatsu, who was not home. Kido and Tani asked Takizō's wife Koryū to make them some rice, but she excused herself citing fatigue from caring for her baby. Kido and Tani left without incident, after which Koryū went to alert police. One officer waited for an opportunity to arrest Tani when he went to the home of his adoptive father Zennosuke Tani, but when the latter refused to open, the officer chased after Tani on his way out of the village, but Tani fled into a bamboo thicket at the Tojo River. Shortly after, another police officer posted at the local jizō hall in Aokidani quarter spotted Kido and Tani and made an arrest attempt, which they again escaped after throwing one of their swords at the office. Due to this incursion, security measures were increased and twenty residents of Suibun who were close with either Denjirō Matsunaga or Kumatarō Kido were taken into protective custody.

On 4 and 5 June, relatives of Kido and Tani went to Mount Kongō in hopes of finding the pair and convincing them to give up peacefully. Police found an abandoned sleeping site potentially belonging to Kido and Tani, but no one showed up during a stakeout of the location. In a different part of the mountain, torn lilies were found with signs that someone had roasted and attempted to eat them. On 6 June, 165 Osaka Police officers arrived as reinforcements in the search. On 7 June, four officers of the Osaka Ajigawa Water Police Station found the remains of Kido and Tani, both dead by gunshot wounds. It is believed that Kido had shot an unknowing Tani from behind before committing suicide with a gunshot to the chest.

== Victims ==
- Onui Morimoto (森本 おぬい), 19, Kido’s wife
- Otora Morimoto (森本 とら), 44, Onui's mother
- Denjirō Matsunaga (松永 傳次郎), 67, Torakichi's father
- Take Matsunaga (松永 たけ), 54, Denjirō's wife.
- Sagorō Matsunaga (松永 佐五郎), 19 or 20, Denjirō's third son.
- Sue Matsunaga (松永すゑ), 13, Denjirō's third daughter
- Kumajirō Matsunaga (松永 熊次郎), 28, Denjirō's first son
- Rie Matsunaga (松永りゑ), 26, Kumajirō's wife
- Kyūtarō Matsunaga (松永久太郎), 5, Kumajirō's son
- Kōtarō Matsunaga (松永幸太郎), 3, Kumajirō's son
- Harue Matsunaga (松永はるえ), infant, Kumajirō's daughter

== Aftermath ==
Following Kido and Tani's brief return to Suiban, as penance for Kido's actions, his father Heiji and his younger half-brother Kōzō gave away one tan (equivalent to 992 m^{2}) of Kido's farmland, which he had previously refused to sell, to the Matsunaga family before leaving the village to complete the Shikoku and Saigoku Kannon Pilgrimage to appease the dead victims and seek forgiveness in Kido's name. While the manhunt was still ongoing, Torakichi Matsunaga openly announced his intention to either kill Kido and Tani himself or kill the remaining Kido family, though villagers intervened before the situation could escalate.

Upon being reported by major Osaka-area newspapers on 27 May, the killings became headline news for the next two weeks. Over the next decades, it inspired several works of Kawachi ondo, with fictionalised versions popular in folksongs, stageplay, and literature. A novel, Kokuhaku by Japanese punk rock singer Kō Machida, was based on the case.
