= Mass murder =

Act of murdering many people in a short span

Mass murder is the violent crime of killing a certain number of people, usually at least three or four, and typically simultaneously or over a relatively short period of time and in close geographic proximity. A mass murder typically occurs in a single location where one or more people kill several others. Data suggests that approximately 30% of United States mass murderers die in the act.

In the United States, Congress defined mass murders as the killing of three or more people during an event with no "cooling-off period" between the homicides, while in the United Kingdom the definition is four or more people killed in one act. The Investigative Assistance for Violent Crimes Act of 2012, passed in the aftermath of the Sandy Hook Elementary School shooting, clarified the statutory authority for federal law enforcement agencies, including those in the Departments of Justice and Homeland Security, to assist state law enforcement agencies, and mandated across federal agencies a definition of "mass killing" as three or more killings during an incident. A mass murder may be further classified as a mass shooting or a mass stabbing. Mass murderers differ from spree killers, who kill at two or more locations with almost no time break between murders and are not defined by the number of victims, and serial killers, who kill people over long periods of time.

== By terrorist organizations ==
Many terrorist groups in recent times have used the tactic of killing many victims to fulfil their political aims. Such incidents have included:

- 19 American airmen killed in the Khobar Towers bombing on June 25, 1996, by Hezbollah Al-Hejaz;
- 2,977 people killed by al-Qaeda in the September 11 attacks of 2001;
- 193 people killed in the 2004 Madrid train bombings by al-Qaeda;
- 334 (including 186 children) killed in the Beslan school siege on September 1–4, 2004 by Riyad-us Saliheen;
- 52 killed in the 2005 London bombings by Islamic terrorists;
- 166 killed in the 2008 Mumbai attacks by Lashkar-e-Taiba;
- 156 children and teachers killed in the 2014 Peshawar school massacre by Tehrik-i-Taliban in Peshawar, Pakistan;
- 1,095 killed in the Camp Speicher massacre by the Islamic State;
- 224 people killed in the Metrojet Flight 9268 by the Islamic State;
- 130 killed as the result of the November 2015 Paris attacks by the Islamic State;
- 168 killed in the Oklahoma City bombing by Timothy McVeigh;
- 29 Palestinian people killed in the Cave of the Patriarchs Massacre on February 25th, 1994 by Kahanist terrorist Baruch Goldstein;

== By cults ==
Certain cults, especially religious cults, have committed a number of mass killings and mass murder–suicides.

- Jim Jones' Peoples Temple in Jonestown, Guyana, where 919 people died in 1978
- Order of the Solar Temple in Canada, Switzerland, and France, where 74 died in 1994, 1995, and 1997
- Shoko Asahara's Aum Shinrikyo, which killed 14 in Tokyo, Japan, in 1995
- Movement for the Restoration of the Ten Commandments of God in Uganda, where 778 died in 2000

== By individuals and governments ==
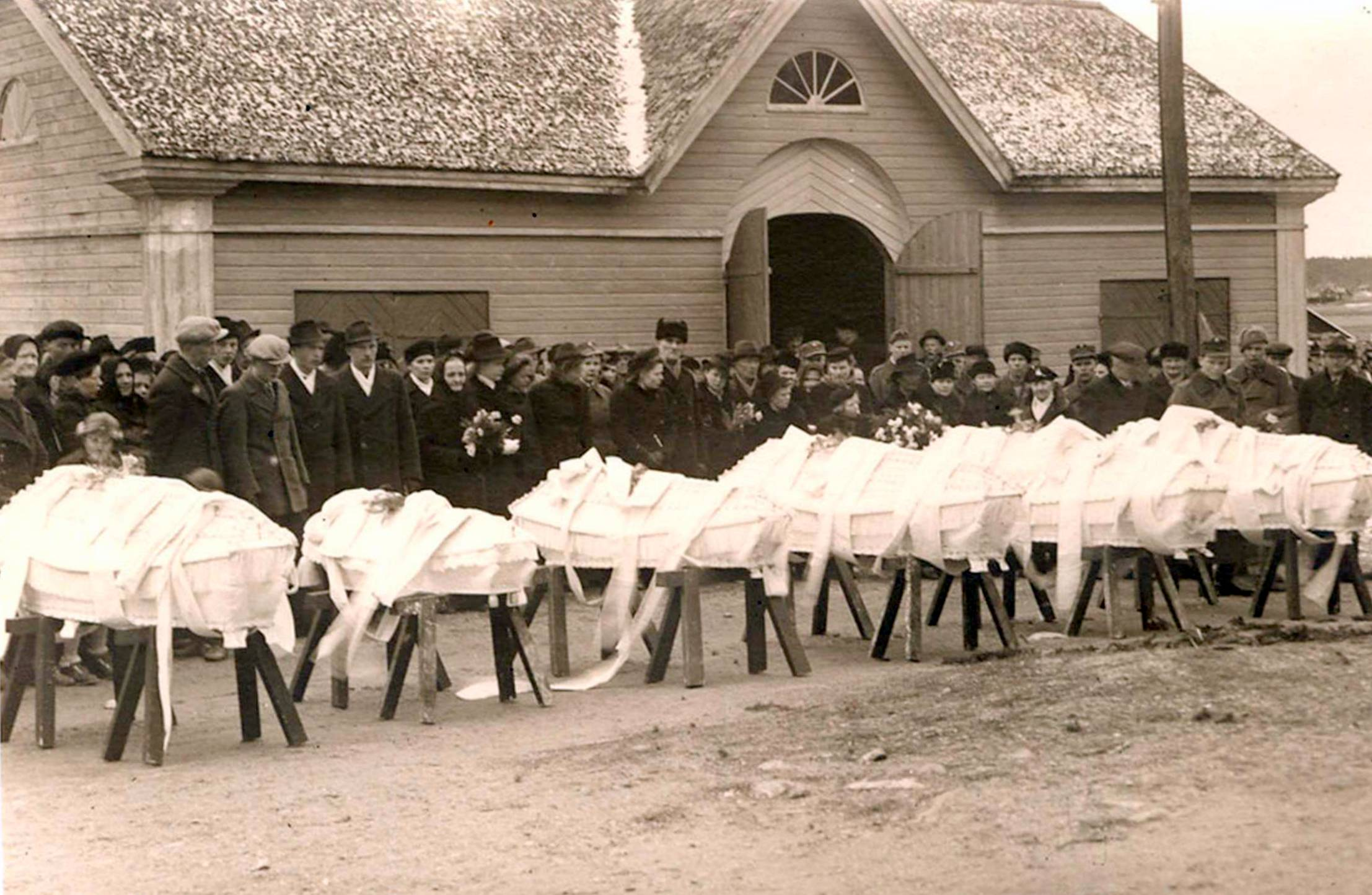
The funeral for sextuple axe murder victims in Huittinen, Finland in 1943, committed by Toivo Koljonen

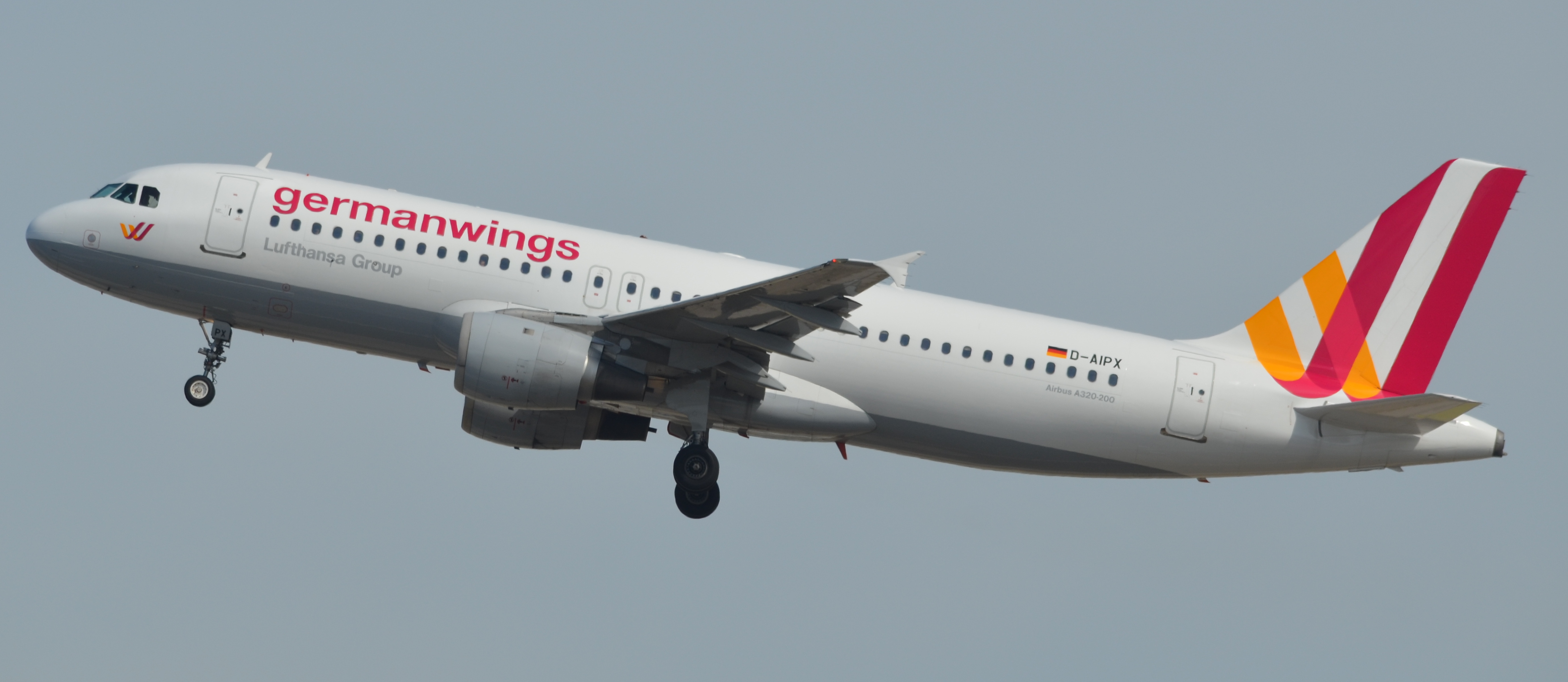
This Airbus A320, registration D-AIPX, was destroyed while operating Germanwings Flight 9525, having been intentionally crashed into the Alps by its co-pilot, killing all 150 people on board.

Mass murderers may be categorized into killers of family, of coworkers, of students, and of random strangers. Their motives vary. One motivation for mass murder is revenge, but other motivations are possible, including the need for attention or fame.

Several autocratic regimes have been known to have ordered mass murders including genocide and politicide. Acting on the orders of Soviet leader Joseph Stalin, Vasili Blokhin's war crime of killing of 7,000 Polish prisoners of war, shot over 28 days, was one of the most organized and protracted mass murders by a single individual on record.

=== Law enforcement response and countermeasures (United States) ===
Analysis of the Columbine High School massacre and other incidents where law enforcement officers waited for backup has resulted in changed recommendations regarding what victims, bystanders, and law enforcement officers should do. In the Columbine shooting, the perpetrators, Eric Harris and Dylan Klebold, were able to murder 14 people, then commit suicide before the first SWAT team even entered the school. Average response time by law enforcement to a mass shooting is typically much longer than the time the shooter is engaged in killing. While immediate action may be extremely dangerous, it could save lives which would be lost if victims and bystanders involved in the situation remain passive, or law enforcement response is delayed until overwhelming force can be deployed. It is recommended that victims and bystanders involved in the incident take active steps to flee, hide, or fight the shooter and that law enforcement officers present or first arriving at the scene attempt immediately to engage the shooter. In many instances, immediate action by victims, bystanders, or law enforcement officers has saved lives. However, law enforcement programs and actions have so far been unable to reduce the total number of incidents. In 2020, a record number of 600 mass shootings occurred.

== Criticism as an analytical category ==
Commentators have pointed out that there are a wide variety of ways that homicides with more than several victims might be classified. Such incidents can be, and have been even in recent decades, classified many different ways including (per Joel Best of Reason magazine) "as a mass shooting; as a school shooting; as mass murder; as workplace violence ...; as a crime involving an assault rifle; as a case of a mentally ill person committing acts of violence; and so on."

How such rarely occurring incidents of homicide are classified tends to change significantly with time.

In the 1960s and 1970s, ... it was understood that the key feature of [a number of such] cases was a high body count. These early discussions of mass murder lumped together [a variety of] cases that varied along what would come to be seen as important dimensions:

- Time: Did the killings occur more or less simultaneously, or did they extend over several days, months, or years?
- Place: Did the killings occur in a single location, or in a variety of places?
- Method: How were the victims killed?

— Joel Best, "How Should We Classify the Sandy Hook Killings?", Reason, June 16, 2013

In the late decades of the 20th century and early years of the 2000s, the most popular classifications moved to include method, time and place.

While such classifications may assist in gaining human meaning, as human-selected categories, they can also carry significant meaning and reflect a particular point of view of the commentator who assigned the descriptor.

== See also ==
- Crimes against humanity
- Genocide
- Gun violence
- List of rampage killers
- Mass destruction
- Mass grave
- Mass killing
- School shooting
- Suicide attack
- Terrorism
- War crime
