= List of acts of the Parliament of the United Kingdom from 1936 =

This is a complete list of acts of the Parliament of the United Kingdom for the year 1936.

Note that the first parliament of the United Kingdom was held in 1801; parliaments between 1707 and 1800 were either parliaments of Great Britain or of Ireland). For acts passed up until 1707, see the list of acts of the Parliament of England and the list of acts of the Parliament of Scotland. For acts passed from 1707 to 1800, see the list of acts of the Parliament of Great Britain. See also the list of acts of the Parliament of Ireland.

For acts of the devolved parliaments and assemblies in the United Kingdom, see the list of acts of the Scottish Parliament, the list of acts of the Northern Ireland Assembly, and the list of acts and measures of Senedd Cymru; see also the list of acts of the Parliament of Northern Ireland.

The number shown after each act's title is its chapter number. Acts passed before 1963 are cited using this number, preceded by the year(s) of the reign during which the relevant parliamentary session was held; thus the Union with Ireland Act 1800 is cited as "39 & 40 Geo. 3 c. 67", meaning the 67th act passed during the session that started in the 39th year of the reign of George III and which finished in the 40th year of that reign. Note that the modern convention is to use Arabic numerals in citations (thus "41 Geo. 3" rather than "41 Geo. III"). Acts of the last session of the Parliament of Great Britain and the first session of the Parliament of the United Kingdom are both cited as "41 Geo. 3". Acts passed from 1963 onwards are simply cited by calendar year and chapter number.

== 26 Geo. 5 & 1 Edw. 8 ==
Continuing the first session of the 37th Parliament of the United Kingdom, which met from 26 November 1935 until 30 October 1936.

This session was also traditionally cited as 26 Geo. 5, 26 G. 5, 26 Geo. 5 & 1 Ed. 8 and 26 G. 5 & 1 E. 8.

=== Public general acts ===
Short title	Citation	Royal assent
Long title
Unemployment Assistance (Temporary Provisions) (Extension) Act 1936 (Note: This was the first public act of the reign of King Edward VIII.) (repealed)	26 Geo. 5 & 1 Edw. 8. c. 7	27 February 1936
An Act to extend until a date not later than the thirty-first day of March nineteen hundred and thirty-six, the period in respect of which grants are to be paid to local authorities out of moneys provided by Parliament under section one of the Unemployment Assistance (Temporary Provisions) (No. 2) Act, 1935. (Note: Unemployment Assistance (Temporary Provisions) (No. 2) Act 1935 (25 & 26 Geo. 5. c. 22)) (Repealed by Statute Law Revision Act 1950 (14 Geo. 6. c. 6))
Consolidated Fund (No. 1) Act 1936 (repealed)	26 Geo. 5 & 1 Edw. 8. c. 8	19 March 1936
An Act to apply a sum out of the Consolidated Fund to the service of the year ending on the thirty-first day of March, one thousand nine hundred and thirty-six. (Repealed by Statute Law Revision Act 1950 (14 Geo. 6. c. 6))
Milk (Extension of Temporary Provisions) Act 1936 (repealed)	26 Geo. 5 & 1 Edw. 8. c. 9	19 March 1936
An Act to extend with amendments certain temporary provisions of the Milk Act, 1934. (Note: Milk Act 1934 (24 & 25 Geo. 5. c. 51)) (Repealed by Statute Law Revision Act 1950 (14 Geo. 6. c. 6))
Unemployment (Northern Ireland Agreement) Act 1936 (repealed)	26 Geo. 5 & 1 Edw. 8. c. 10	19 March 1936
An Act to confirm and give effect to an Agreement made between the Treasury and the Ministry of Finance for Northern Ireland with a view to assimilating the burdens on the Exchequer of the United Kingdom and the Exchequer of Northern Ireland in respect of unemployment. (Repealed by Unemployment and Family Allowances (Northern Ireland Agreement) Act 1946 (10 & 11 Geo. 6. c. 3))
Consolidated Fund (No. 2) Act 1936 (repealed)	26 Geo. 5 & 1 Edw. 8. c. 11	30 March 1936
An Act to apply certain sums out of the Consolidated Fund to the service of the years ending on the thirty-first day of March, one thousand nine hundred and thirty-five, one thousand nine hundred and thirty-six and one thousand nine hundred and thirty-seven. (Repealed by Statute Law Revision Act 1950 (14 Geo. 6. c. 6))
British Shipping (Continuance of Subsidy) Act 1936 (repealed)	26 Geo. 5 & 1 Edw. 8. c. 12	9 April 1936
An Act to extend by twelve months the period in respect of which subsidies are payable under Part I of the British Shipping (Assistance) Act, 1935; (Note: British Shipping (Assistance) Act 1935 (25 & 26 Geo. 5. c. 7)) to render eligible for subsidy under that Part of that Act vessels to which that Act applies which are registered at ports in the United Kingdom and which became British ships on or before the first day of January nineteen hundred and thirty-six; and to provide for the payment of such subsidies and of the expenses of the Board of Trade under the said Part I, in respect of the year nineteen hundred and thirty-six, out of moneys provided by Parliament. (Repealed by Statute Law Revision Act 1950 (14 Geo. 6. c. 6))
Unemployment Insurance (Agriculture) Act 1936 (repealed)	26 Geo. 5 & 1 Edw. 8. c. 13	9 April 1936
An Act to include employment in agriculture among the employments which are insurable under the Unemployment Insurance Act, 1935, (Note: Unemployment Insurance Act 1935 (25 & 26 Geo. 5. c. 8)) and to make modifications in the provisions of that Act in their application to such employment, and other consequential modifications in those provisions. (Repealed for England and Wales and Scotland by National Insurance Act 1946 (9 & 10 Geo. 6. c. 67) and for Northern Ireland by Statute Law Revision Act (Northern Ireland) 1954 (c. 35 (N.I.)))
Army and Air Force (Annual) Act 1936 (repealed)	26 Geo. 5 & 1 Edw. 8. c. 14	30 April 1936
An Act to provide, during Twelve Months, for the Discipline and Regulation of the Army and the Air Force. (Repealed by Statute Law Revision Act 1950 (14 Geo. 6. c. 6) and Revision of the Army and Air Force Acts (Transitional Provisions) Act 1955 (3 & 4 Eliz. 2. c. 20) (Note: Incorrectly cited as "Revision of the Army and Air Force Acts (Transtl Provns), 1955 c 20, s 1(5)" in the Chronological Table of the Statutes.))
Civil List Act 1936 (repealed)	26 Geo. 5 & 1 Edw. 8. c. 15	21 May 1936
An Act to make provision for the honour and dignity of the Crown and the Royal Family, and for the payment of certain salaries, allowances and pensions; to enable His Majesty to assent to arrangements on behalf of any son of His Majesty being Duke of Cornwall for the payment of certain sums out of the revenues of the Duchy during the minority of the said Duke; and for purposes connected with the matters aforesaid. (Repealed by Statute Law (Repeals) Act 1993 (c. 50))
Coinage Offences Act 1936 (repealed)	26 Geo. 5 & 1 Edw. 8. c. 16	21 May 1936
An Act to consolidate the provisions of the Coinage Offences Acts, 1861 (Note: Coinage Offences Act 1861 (24 & 25 Vict. c. 99)) and 1935, (Note: Counterfeit Currency (Convention) Act 1935 (25 & 26 Geo. 5. c. 25)) and of the Counterfeit Medal Act, 1883. (Note: Counterfeit Medal Act 1883 (46 & 47 Vict. c. 45)) (Repealed by Forgery and Counterfeiting Act 1981 (c. 45))
Voluntary Hospitals (Paying Patients) Act 1936	26 Geo. 5 & 1 Edw. 8. c. 17	21 May 1936
An Act to empower voluntary hospitals in pursuance of Orders of the Charity Commissioners to provide accommodation and treatment for paying patients.
Sugar Industry (Reorganisation) Act 1936 (repealed)	26 Geo. 5 & 1 Edw. 8. c. 18	21 May 1936
An Act to provide for the establishment of a Sugar Commission; for the amalgamation into a single corporation of companies manufacturing sugar from home-grown beet; for granting financial assistance to that corporation and to the companies aforesaid; and otherwise for the reorganization of the sugar industry. (Repealed by Sugar Act 1956 (4 & 5 Eliz. 2. c. 48))
Special Areas Reconstruction (Agreement) Act 1936 (repealed)	26 Geo. 5 & 1 Edw. 8. c. 19	29 May 1936
An Act to authorise the Treasury to make an agreement with a company to be incorporated by the name of the Special Areas Reconstruction Association Limited and to make payments to the company in accordance with that agreement; and for purposes connected with the matters aforesaid. (Repealed by Statute Law Revision Act 1963 (c. 30))
Electricity Supply (Meters) Act 1936 (repealed)	26 Geo. 5 & 1 Edw. 8. c. 20	29 May 1936
An Act to make better provision for the measurement of electricity supplied by authorised undertakers. (Repealed by Electricity Act 1989 (c. 29))
Cotton Spinning Industry Act 1936 or the Cotton Industry (Reorganisation) Act 1936 (repealed)	26 Geo. 5 & 1 Edw. 8. c. 21	29 May 1936
An Act to provide for the elimination of redundant spinning machinery in cotton mills in Great Britain by means of a Board having power to acquire property and to borrow and levy money; for the making of certain payments to the said Board out of the Consolidated Fund or moneys provided by Parliament, and the making of certain payments by the said Board to the Exchequer; and for purposes connected with the matters aforesaid. (Repealed by Statute Law Revision Act 1953 (2 & 3 Eliz. 2. c. 5))
Hours of Employment (Conventions) Act 1936 (repealed)	26 Geo. 5 & 1 Edw. 8. c. 22	14 July 1936
An Act to carry out certain draft International Conventions relating to the employment of women during the night and to hours of work in automatic sheet-glass works, to amend the law relating to the hours of employment of women holding responsible positions of management who are not ordinarily engaged in manual work, and for purposes connected with the matters aforesaid. (Repealed for England and Wales and Scotland by Health and Safety (Repeals and Revocations) Regulations 1995 (SI 1995/3234) and for Northern Ireland by Health and Safety (Repeals and Revocations) Regulations (Northern Ireland) 1996 (SR 1996/21))
Road Traffic (Driving Licences) Act 1936 (repealed)	26 Geo. 5 & 1 Edw. 8. c. 23	14 July 1936
An Act to amend the law in relation to the issue of motor driving licences. (Repealed by Road Traffic Act 1960 (8 & 9 Eliz. 2. c. 16))
Employment of Women and Young Persons Act 1936 (repealed)	26 Geo. 5 & 1 Edw. 8. c. 24	14 July 1936
An Act to make pro vision for the employment of women and young persons in factories and workshops on a system of shifts, and for purposes connected with the matter aforesaid. (Repealed by Factories Act 1961 (9 & 10 Eliz. 2. c. 34))
Pensions (Governors of Dominions, &c.) Act 1936 (repealed)	26 Geo. 5 & 1 Edw. 8. c. 25	14 July 1936
An Act to amend the Pensions (Governors of Dominions, &c.) Acts, 1911 (Note: Pensions (Governors of Dominions, &c.) Act 1911 (1 & 2 Geo. 5. c. 24)) and 1929. (Note: Pensions (Governors of Dominions, &c.) Act 1929 (19 & 20 Geo. 5. c. 16)) (Repealed by Governors' Pensions Act 1957 (5 & 6 Eliz. 2. c. 62))
Land Registration Act 1936 (repealed)	26 Geo. 5 & 1 Edw. 8. c. 26	14 July 1936
An Act to amend the procedure under the Land Registration Act, 1925, (Note: Land Registration Act 1925 (15 & 16 Geo. 5. c. 21)) for the making of orders declaring the registration of title to land to be compulsory on sale; to provide for the partial closing of, and otherwise amend the law with respect to, the Middlesex Deeds Registry; to amend subsection (4) of section seventy-five of the Land Registration Act, 1925; to amend the law with respect to the Insurance Fund established under the Land Transfer Act, 1897, (Note: Land Transfer Act 1897 (60 & 61 Vict. c. 65)) and the fees payable under the Land Registration Act, 1925; and for purposes connected with the matters aforesaid. (Repealed by Land Registration Act 2002 (c. 9))
Petroleum (Transfer of Licences) Act 1936 (repealed)	26 Geo. 5 & 1 Edw. 8. c. 27	14 July 1936
An Act to make provision with respect to the transfer of petroleum-spirit licences granted under the Petroleum (Consolidation) Act, 1928. (Note: Petroleum (Consolidation) Act 1928 (18 & 19 Geo. 5. c. 32)) (Repealed by Petroleum (Consolidation) Regulations 2014 (SI 2014/1637))
Shops Act 1936 (repealed)	26 Geo. 5 & 1 Edw. 8. c. 28	14 July 1936
An Act to provide for the application of the Shops Acts, 1912 to 1934, to premises and places where the business of lending books or periodicals is carried on for purposes of gain. (Repealed by Shops Act 1950 (14 Geo. 6. c. 28))
Malta (Letters Patent) Act 1936 (repealed)	26 Geo. 5 & 1 Edw. 8. c. 29	14 July 1936
An Act to remove the limitation of His Majesty's power to revoke or amend the Malta Constitution Letters Patent, 1921; to declare the validity of certain Ordinances of the Governor of Malta; and for purposes connected with the matters aforesaid. (Repealed by Malta Independence Act 1964 (c. 86))
Retail Meat Dealers' Shops (Sunday Closing) Act 1936 (repealed)	26 Geo. 5 & 1 Edw. 8. c. 30	14 July 1936
An Act to provide, with certain exceptions, for the compulsory closing of retail meat traders' shops and stalls on Sundays. (Repealed by Shops Act 1950 (14 Geo. 6. c. 28))
Old Age Pensions Act 1936 (repealed)	26 Geo. 5 & 1 Edw. 8. c. 31	14 July 1936
An Act to consolidate the enactments relating to non-contributory Old Age Pensions. (Repealed for England and Wales and Scotland by Ministry of Social Security Act 1966 (c. 20) and for Northern Ireland by Social Security (Miscellaneous Provisions) (Northern Ireland) Order 1977 (SI 1977/610 (N.I. 11)))
National Health Insurance Act 1936 (repealed)	26 Geo. 5 & 1 Edw. 8. c. 32	14 July 1936
An Act to consolidate the enactments relating to National Health Insurance. (Repealed by National Insurance Act 1946 (9 & 10 Geo. 6. c. 67))
Widows', Orphans' and Old Age Contributory Pensions Act 1936 (repealed)	26 Geo. 5 & 1 Edw. 8. c. 33	14 July 1936
An Act to consolidate the enactments relating to Widows', Orphans' and Old Age Contributory Pensions. (Repealed by National Insurance Act 1946 (9 & 10 Geo. 6. c. 67))
Finance Act 1936	26 Geo. 5 & 1 Edw. 8. c. 34	16 July 1936
An Act to grant certain duties of Customs and Inland Revenue (including Excise), to alter other duties, and to amend the law relating to Customs and Inland Revenue (including Excise) and the National Debt, and to make further provision in connection with Finance.
Solicitors Act 1936 (repealed)	26 Geo. 5 & 1 Edw. 8. c. 35	16 July 1936
An Act to amend the enactments relating to solicitors, and for purposes connected therewith. (Repealed by Solicitors (Amendment) Act 1974 (c. 26))
Pilotage Authorities (Limitation of Liability) Act 1936 (repealed)	26 Geo. 5 & 1 Edw. 8. c. 36	16 July 1936
An Act to make provision with respect to the liability of pilotage authorities and others. (Repealed for the United Kingdom by Pilotage Act 1983 (c. 21) and for the Isle of Man by Statute Law (Repeals) Act 1986 (c. 12))
Appropriation Act 1936 (repealed)	26 Geo. 5 & 1 Edw. 8. c. 37	31 July 1936
An Act to apply a sum out of the Consolidated Fund to the service of the year ending on the thirty-first day of March, one thousand nine hundred and thirty-seven, and to appropriate the Supplies granted in this Session of Parliament. (Repealed by Statute Law Revision Act 1950 (14 Geo. 6. c. 6))
Weights and Measures Act 1936 (repealed)	26 Geo. 5 & 1 Edw. 8. c. 38	31 July 1936
An Act to amend the Weights and Measures Acts, 1878 to 1926, by making provision with respect to the measuring, sale, and conveyance of sand, ballast and similar materials, and with respect to the discharge of the functions of the Board of Trade; and for purposes connected with the matters aforesaid. (Repealed by Weights and Measures Act 1963 (c. 31))
Firearms (Amendment) Act 1936 (repealed)	26 Geo. 5 & 1 Edw. 8. c. 39	31 July 1936
An Act to amend the Firearms Act, 1920, (Note: Firearms Act 1920 (10 & 11 Geo. 5. c. 43)) and the Firearms Act, 1934, (Note: Firearms Act 1934 (24 & 25 Geo. 5. c. 16)) and in connection therewith to amend subsection (2) of section five of the Firearms and Imitation Firearms (Criminal Use) Act, 1933. (Note: Firearms and Imitation Firearms (Criminal Use) Act 1933 (23 & 24 Geo. 5. c. 50)) (Repealed for England and Wales and Scotland by Firearms Act 1937 (1 Edw. 8 & 1 Geo. 6. c. 12) and for Northern Ireland by Firearms Act (Northern Ireland) 1969 (c. 12 (N.I.)))
Midwives Act 1936 (repealed)	26 Geo. 5 & 1 Edw. 8. c. 40	31 July 1936
An Act to amend the Midwives Acts, 1902 to 1926. (Repealed by Statute Law (Repeals) Act 1986 (c. 12))
Education Act 1936 (repealed)	26 Geo. 5 & 1 Edw. 8. c. 41	31 July 1936
An Act to amend the law with respect to the school leaving age, and attendance at school; to enable local education authorities to make grants to non-provided schools in certain cases, and to amend the law in relation to schools receiving such grants; to amend the law with respect to religious instruction in certain non-provided schools; to amend the law with respect to the age up to which certain provisions of Part II of the Children and Young Persons Act, 1933, (Note: Children and Young Persons Act 1933 (23 & 24 Geo. 5. c. 12)) have effect; and for purposes connected with the matters aforesaid. (Repealed by Education Act 1944 (7 & 8 Geo. 6. c. 31))
Education (Scotland) Act 1936 (repealed)	26 Geo. 5 & 1 Edw. 8. c. 42	31 July 1936
An Act to amend the provisions of the Education (Scotland) Acts, 1872 to 1933, with regard to the age up to which parents are required to provide efficient education for their children and in other respects; and to amend the provisions of Part IV of the Children and Young Persons (Scotland) Act, 1932, (Note: Children and Young Persons (Scotland) Act 1932 (22 & 23 Geo. 5. c. 47)) with regard to the age up to which those provisions have effect and with regard to the employment of children in entertainments. (Repealed by Local Government (Scotland) Act 1947 (10 & 11 Geo. 6. c. 43))
Tithe Act 1936	26 Geo. 5 & 1 Edw. 8. c. 43	31 July 1936
An Act to extinguish tithe rentcharge and extraordinary tithe rentcharge, and to make provision with respect to the compensation of the owners thereof and rating authorities and to the liabilities of the owners of land charged therewith in respect of the extinguishment thereof; to reduce the rate at which tithe rentcharge is to be payable pending its extinguishment and to make provision with respect to the recovery of arrears thereof; to make provision for the redemption and extinguishment of corn rents and similar payments; and for purposes connected with the matters aforesaid.
Air Navigation Act 1936 (repealed)	26 Geo. 5 & 1 Edw. 8. c. 44	31 July 1936
An Act to amend the law with respect to aviation and matters connected therewith. (Repealed by Statute Law (Repeals) Act 1986 (c. 12))
Isle of Man (Customs) Act 1936 (repealed)	26 Geo. 5 & 1 Edw. 8. c. 45	31 July 1936
An Act to amend the law with respect to customs in the Isle of Man. (Repealed for the Isle of Man by Customs and Excise etc. Order 1976 (GC No 1/76))
Cattle Industry (Emergency Provisions) Act 1936 (repealed)	26 Geo. 5 & 1 Edw. 8. c. 46	31 July 1936
An Act to extend until the end of July, nineteen hundred and thirty-seven, the period during which cattle or carcases of cattle must have been sold in order that payments in respect thereof may be made out of the Cattle Fund. (Repealed by Statute Law Revision Act 1950 (14 Geo. 6. c. 6))
Crown Lands Act 1936	26 Geo. 5 & 1 Edw. 8. c. 47	31 July 1936
An Act to Provide for the vesting in the Commissioners of Works of certain Crown lands in Westminster as a site for public offices and police offices, to amend the law with respect to other Crown lands, to amend the Crown Lands Acts, 1829 to 1927, and the Public Offices (Sites) Act, 1912, (Note: Public Offices (Sites) Act 1912 (2 & 3 Geo. 5. c. cx)) and for purposes connected with the matters aforesaid.
Health Resorts and Watering Places Act 1936 (repealed)	26 Geo. 5 & 1 Edw. 8. c. 48	31 July 1936
An Act to empower local authorities to advertise health resorts and watering places. (Repealed for England and Wales by Local Government Act 1972 (c. 70) and for Scotland by Local Government (Scotland) Act 1973 (c. 65))
Public Health Act 1936	26 Geo. 5 & 1 Edw. 8. c. 49	31 July 1936
An Act to consolidate with amendments certain enactments relating to public health.
Public Health (London) Act 1936 (repealed)	26 Geo. 5 & 1 Edw. 8. c. 50	31 July 1936
An Act to consolidate certain enactments relating to public health in London. (Repealed by London Government Act 1963 (c. 33))
Housing Act 1936 (repealed)	26 Geo. 5 & 1 Edw. 8. c. 51	31 July 1936
An Act to consolidate the Housing Acts, 1925 to 1935, and certain other enactments relating to housing. (Repealed by Housing (Financial Provisions) Act 1958 (6 & 7 Eliz. 2. c. 42))
Private Legislation Procedure (Scotland) Act 1936	26 Geo. 5 & 1 Edw. 8. c. 52	31 July 1936
An Act to consolidate the enactments relating to the procedure for obtaining parliamentary powers by way of Provisional Orders in matters affecting Scotland.
Shops (Sunday Trading Restriction) Act 1936 (repealed)	26 Geo. 5 & 1 Edw. 8. c. 53	31 July 1936
An Act to restrict the opening of shops and trading on Sunday; and for other purposes connected therewith. (Repealed by Shops Act 1950 (14 Geo. 6. c. 28))
Weights and Measures, Sale of Coal (Scotland) Act 1936 (repealed)	26 Geo. 5 & 1 Edw. 8. c. 54	31 July 1936
An Act to amend the Weights and Measures Acts, 1878 to 1926, by making provision with respect to the sale of coal in Scotland, and to repeal certain existing enactments with respect thereto. (Repealed by Weights and Measures Act 1963 (c. 31))

=== Local acts ===
Short title	Citation	Royal assent
Long title
Edinburgh Corporation Order Confirmation Act 1936 (repealed)	26 Geo. 5 & 1 Edw. 8. c. vi	27 February 1936
An Act to confirm a Provisional Order under the Private Legislation Procedure (Scotland) Acts 1899 (Note: Private Legislation Procedure (Scotland) Act 1899 (62 & 63 Vict. c. 47)) and 1933 (Note: Private Legislation Procedure (Scotland) Act 1933 (23 & 24 Geo. 5. c. 37)) relating to Edinburgh Corporation. (Repealed by Edinburgh Corporation Order Confirmation Act 1961 (10 & 11 Eliz. 2. c. ii))
	Edinburgh Corporation Order 1935 (Note: Although passed in 1936, the short title is specified as the Edinburgh Corporation Order 1935.) Provisional Order to provide for the reduction of the compensation water from the Talla reservoir of the corporation of the city and royal burgh of Edinburgh to authorise the Corporation to make and maintain a tramway and a street work to acquire lands and to borrow money to amend the Edinburgh Corporation Acts and for other purposes.	
Perth Corporation Order Confirmation Act 1936	26 Geo. 5 & 1 Edw. 8. c. vii	19 March 1936
An Act to confirm a Provisional Order under the Private Legislation Procedure (Scotland) Acts 1899 and 1933 relating to Perth Corporation.
	Perth Corporation Order 1935 (Note: Although passed in 1936, the short title is specified as the Perth Corporation Order 1935.) Provisional Order to extend the boundaries of the city and royal burgh of Perth to authorise the establishment of a burgh fund to authorise certain street works to empower the creation of redeemable stock and for other purposes.	
Ministry of Health Provisional Order Confirmation (Bedford Joint Hospital District) Act 1936 (repealed)	26 Geo. 5 & 1 Edw. 8. c. viii	19 March 1936
An Act to confirm a Provisional Order of the Minister of Health relating to the Bedford Joint Hospital District. (Repealed by Statute Law (Repeals) Act 1995)
	Bedford Joint Hospital District Order 1935 Provisional order forming a united district under section 279 of the Public Health Act 1875. (Note: Public Health Act 1875 (38 & 39 Vict. c. 55))	
Ministry of Health Provisional Order Confirmation (Bury and District Joint Hospital District) Act 1936	26 Geo. 5 & 1 Edw. 8. c. ix	19 March 1936
An Act to confirm a Provisional Order of the Minister of Health relating to the Bury and District Joint Hospital District.
	Bury and District Joint Hospital Order (No. 2) 1935 (Note: Although passed in 1936, the short title is specified as the Bury and District Joint Hospital Order (No. 2) 1935.) Provisional Order altering certain Confirming Acts.	
Ministry of Health Provisional Order Confirmation (Chester and Derby) Act 1936	26 Geo. 5 & 1 Edw. 8. c. x	19 March 1936
An Act to confirm a Provisional Order of the Minister of Health relating to the counties of Chester and Derby.
	Chester and Derby Order 1935 (Note: Although passed in 1936, the short title is specified as the Chester and Derby Order 1935.) Provisional Order made in pursuance of the Local Government Act 1933 (Note: Local Government Act 1933 (23 & 24 Geo. 5. c. 51)) for altering county boundaries.	
Ministry of Health Provisional Order Confirmation (Mid-Sussex Joint Hospital District) Act 1936	26 Geo. 5 & 1 Edw. 8. c. xi	19 March 1936
An Act to confirm a Provisional Order of the Minister of Health relating to the Mid-Sussex Joint Hospital Distrioct.
	Mid-Sussex Joint Hospital Order 1935 (Note: Although passed in 1936, the short title is specified as the Mid-Sussex Joint Hospital Order 1935.) Provisional order forming a united district under section 279 of the Public Health Act 1875.	
Ministry of Health Provisional Order Confirmation (North East Lindsey Joint Hospital District) Act 1936	26 Geo. 5 & 1 Edw. 8. c. xii	19 March 1936
An Act to confirm a Provisional Order of the Minister of Health relating to the North East Lindsey Joint Hospital District.
	North East Lindsey Joint Hospital Order 1935 (Note: Although passed in 1936, the short title is specified as the North East Lindsey Joint Hospital Order 1935.) Provisional order forming a united district under section 279 of the Public Health Act 1875.	
Ministry of Health Provisional Order Confirmation (Saint Albans Joint Hospital District) Act 1936	26 Geo. 5 & 1 Edw. 8. c. xiii	19 March 1936
An Act to confirm a Provisional Order of the Minister of Health relating to the Saint Albans Joint Hospital District.
	Saint Albans Joint Hospital Order 1935 (Note: Although passed in 1936, the short title is specified as the Saint Albans Joint Hospital Order 1935.) Provisional order forming a united district under section 279 of the Public Health Act 1875.	
Ministry of Health Provisional Order Confirmation (South Staffordshire Joint Small-pox Hospital District) Act 1936	26 Geo. 5 & 1 Edw. 8. c. xiv	19 March 1936
An Act to confirm a Provisional Order of the Minister of Health relating to the South Staffordshire Joint Small-pox Hospital District.
	South Staffordshire Joint Small-pox Hospital Order 1935 (Note: Although passed in 1936, the short title is specified as the South Staffordshire Joint Small-pox Hospital Order 1935.) Provisional order altering the South Staffordshire Joint Small-pox Hospital Orders 1903 to 1931.	
Great Orme Tramways Act 1936	26 Geo. 5 & 1 Edw. 8. c. xv	30 March 1936
An Act to make further provision as to the rates or charges chargeable by the Great Orme Railway Limited in respect of the tramway and tramroad from Llandudno to the Great Ormeshead in the county of Carnarvon.
Imperial Continental Gas Association Act 1936	26 Geo. 5 & 1 Edw. 8. c. xvi	30 March 1936
An Act to extend the objects of the Imperial Continental Gas Association and for other purposes.
Brighton Marine Palace and Pier Act 1936	26 Geo. 5 & 1 Edw. 8. c. xvii	9 April 1936
An Act to empower the Brighton Marine Palace and Pier Company to redeem its preference shares and for other purposes.
Warkworth Harbour Act 1936	26 Geo. 5 & 1 Edw. 8. c. xviii	9 April 1936
An Act to make further provision with respect to the rates tolls and dues leviable by the Warkworth Harbour Commissioners.
South Essex Waterworks Act 1936 (repealed)	26 Geo. 5 & 1 Edw. 8. c. xix	9 April 1936
An Act to make better provision with respect to the laying and maintenance of pipes for the supply of water within the limits of supply of the South Essex Waterworks Company and for purposes connected therewith. (Repealed by South Essex Waterworks Order 1964 (SI 1964/1548))
East Lothian County Council Order Confirmation Act 1936	26 Geo. 5 & 1 Edw. 8. c. xx	21 May 1936
An Act to confirm a Provisional Order under the Private Legislation Procedure (Scotland) Acts 1899 and 1933 relating to East Lothian County Council.
	East Lothian County Council Order 1936 Provisional Order to provide for the regulation of tents vans and other structures in the county of East Lothian to make further provision with regard to the valuation of lands in that county and for other purposes.	
Glasgow Corporation Order Confirmation Act 1936	26 Geo. 5 & 1 Edw. 8. c. xxi	21 May 1936
An Act to confirm a Provisional Order under the Private Legislation Procedure (Scotland) Acts 1899 and 1933 relating to Glasgow Corporation.
	Glasgow Corporation Order 1936 Provisional Order to authorise the corporation of the city of Glasgow to erect public baths and a public washhouse on Glasgow Green and to sell part of the site of the existing public baths and washhouse and adjoining ground there to confirm an agreement with respect to such sale to confirm an agreement with the Kirk Session of Glasgow Cathedral to empower the Corporation to borrow money for the purposes of their tramway undertaking and libraries to extend the time for the completion of Finnieston Bridge and certain tramways and for the purchase of lands for the bridge to re-enact with amendments section 31 of the Glasgow Police (Further Powers) Act 1892 (Note: Glasgow Police (Further Powers) Act 1892 (55 & 56 Vict. c. clxv)) and for other purposes.	
Grampian Electricity Supply Order Confirmation Act 1936	26 Geo. 5 & 1 Edw. 8. c. xxii	21 May 1936
An Act to confirm a Provisional Order under the Private Legislation Procedure (Scotland) Acts 1899 and 1933 relating to Grampian Electricity Supply.
	Grampian Electricity Supply Order 1936 Provisional Order to authorise the Grampian Electricity Supply Company to abandon certain of the works authorised by the Grampian Electricity Supply Act 1922 (Note: Grampian Electricity Supply Act 1922 (12 & 13 Geo. 5. c. lxxix)) and to construct new works in substitution therefor to extend the periods for the compulsory purchase of lands and for the completion of certain authorised works to increase the capital of the Company and for other purposes.	
Ministry of Health Provisional Order Confirmation (Luton) Act 1936	26 Geo. 5 & 1 Edw. 8. c. xxiii	21 May 1936
An Act to confirm a Provisional Order of the Minister of Health relating to the borough of Luton.
	Luton Order 1936 Provisional Order amending the Luton Corporation Act 1911. (Note: Luton Corporation Act 1911 (1 & 2 Geo. 5. c. lxxxvii))	
Ministry of Health Provisional Order Confirmation (Matlock) Act 1936	26 Geo. 5 & 1 Edw. 8. c. xxiv	21 May 1936
An Act to confirm a Provisional Order of the Minister of Health relating to the urban district of Matlock.
	Matlock Order 1936 Provisional order partially repealing and amending certain local Acts and a provisional order.	
Ministry of Health Provisional Order Confirmation (Bridport Joint Hospital District) Act 1936	26 Geo. 5 & 1 Edw. 8. c. xxv	21 May 1936
An Act to confirm a Provisional Order of the Minister of Health relating to the Bridport Joint Hospital District.
	Bridport Joint Hospital Order 1936 Provisional Order altering the Bridport Joint Hospital Order 1917.	
Royal National Pension Fund for Nurses Act 1936	26 Geo. 5 & 1 Edw. 8. c. xxvi	21 May 1936
An Act for the removal of doubts as to the validity of certain policies issued by the Royal National Pension Fund for Nurses to extend the objects of the fund and for other purposes.
Mersey Docks and Harbour Board Act 1936	26 Geo. 5 & 1 Edw. 8. c. xxvii	21 May 1936
An Act to extend the period for the completion of works authorised to be constructed by the Mersey Docks and Harbour Board and for other purposes.
Nottinghamshire and Derbyshire Traction Act 1936 (repealed)	26 Geo. 5 & 1 Edw. 8. c. xxviii	21 May 1936
An Act to empower the Nottinghamshire and Derbyshire Traction Company to run trolley vehicles on an additional route to extend the Company's powers of running public service vehicles to provide for the sub-division of the shares in the capital of the Company and for other purposes. (Repealed by Statute Law (Repeals) Act 1995)
Rhymney Valley Sewerage Board Act 1936 (repealed)	26 Geo. 5 & 1 Edw. 8. c. xxix	21 May 1936
An Act to alter the terms upon which sewage from certain areas comprised within the Magor and St. Mellons Rural District is received and disposed of by the Rhymney Valley Sewerage Board and for other purposes. (Repealed by Mid Glamorgan County Council Act 1987 (c. vii))
South East Cornwall Water Board Act 1936	26 Geo. 5 & 1 Edw. 8. c. xxx	21 May 1936
An Act to constitute and incorporate a joint board consisting of representatives of the rural district council of Saint Germans and the urban district council of Looe with power to construct works for intercepting and distributing the waters of the Rushyford Brook (otherwise the Rushy Brook) and the Withey Brook and for other purposes.
Yorkshire Electric Power Act 1936 (repealed)	26 Geo. 5 & 1 Edw. 8. c. xxxi	21 May 1936
An Act to confer further powers upon the Yorkshire Electric Power Company and for other purposes. (Repealed by Statute Law (Repeals) Act 1989 (c. 43))
Alexander Scott's Hospital Order Confirmation Act 1936 (repealed)	26 Geo. 5 & 1 Edw. 8. c. xxxii	29 May 1936
An Act to confirm a Provisional Order under the Private Legislation Procedure (Scotland) Acts 1899 and 1933 relating to Alexander Scott's Hospital. (Repealed by Alexander Scott's Hospital Order Confirmation Act 1949 (12, 13 & 14 Geo. 6. c. xii))
	Alexander Scott's Hospital Order 1935 Provisional Order to extend the qualifications for the admission of inmates to Alexander Scott's Hospital and for other purposes.	
Buckhaven and Methil Burgh Order Confirmation Act 1936	26 Geo. 5 & 1 Edw. 8. c. xxxiii	29 May 1936
An Act to confirm a Provisional Order under the Private Legislation Procedure (Scotland) Acts 1899 and 1933 relating to Buckhaven and Methil Burgh.
	Buckhaven and Methil Burgh Order 1936 Provisional Order to extend the boundaries of the burgh of Buckhaven and Methil and for other purposes.	
Ministry of Health Provisional Order Confirmation (Bristol) Act 1936 (repealed)	26 Geo. 5 & 1 Edw. 8. c. xxxiv	29 May 1936
An Act to confirm a Provisional Order of the Minister of Health relating to the city of Bristol. (Repealed by County of Avon Act 1982 (c. iv))
	Bristol Order 1936 Provisional order altering a local Act. (Note: Clifton and Durdham Downs (Bristol) Act 1861 (24 & 25 Vict. c. xiv))	
Ministry of Health Provisional Order Confirmation (Falmouth) Act 1936	26 Geo. 5 & 1 Edw. 8. c. xxxv	29 May 1936
An Act to confirm a Provisional Order of the Minister of Health relating to the borough of Falmouth.
	Falmouth Order 1936 Provisional order altering certain local Acts.	
Ministry of Health Provisional Order Confirmation (Stockton-on-Tees) Act 1936 (repealed)	26 Geo. 5 & 1 Edw. 8. c. xxxvi	29 May 1936
An Act to confirm a Provisional Order of the Minister of Health relating to the borough of Stockton-on-Tees. (Repealed by Teesside Corporation (General Powers) Act 1971 (c. xv))
	Stockton-on-Tees Order 1936 Provisional Order altering a local Act. (Note: Stockton-on-Tees Corporation (Works) Act 1930 (20 & 21 Geo. 5. c. cxvii))	
Bedwellty Urban District Council Act 1936	26 Geo. 5 & 1 Edw. 8. c. xxxvii	29 May 1936
An Act to alter the incidence of rating for certain purposes in the urban district of Bedwellty to confer further powers on the urban district council of Bedwellty for and in connection with their electricity undertaking and the improvement good government and finances of their district and for other purposes.
Winchester Corporation Act 1936	26 Geo. 5 & 1 Edw. 8. c. xxxviii	29 May 1936
An Act to empower the mayor aldermen and citizens of the city of Winchester to acquire the water undertaking of the Winchester Water and Gas Company to authorise the said mayor aldermen and citizens to supply water in and in the neighbourhood of their city and for other purposes.
Swansea and District Transport Act 1936 (repealed)	26 Geo. 5 & 1 Edw. 8. c. xxxix	29 May 1936
An Act to provide for the abandonment of the tramways and light railways in the county borough of Swansea to confer further powers on the Swansea Improvements and Tramways Company to ratify the assignment to the South Wales Transport Company Limited of a lease of the Oystermouth railway or tramroad and the works of the Mumbles Railway and Pier Company and for other purposes. (Repealed by South Wales Transport Act 1959 (7 & 8 Eliz. 2. c. l))
North Wales Electric Power Act 1936	26 Geo. 5 & 1 Edw. 8. c. xl	29 May 1936
An Act to authorise an increase in the capital of the North Wales Power Company Limited and for other purposes.
East Lothian County Council Act 1936	26 Geo. 5 & 1 Edw. 8. c. xli	29 May 1936
An Act to empower the county council of the county of East Lothian to control the seashore and lands adjoining the same within the said county and for other purposes.
Uckfield Water Act 1936 (repealed)	26 Geo. 5 & 1 Edw. 8. c. xlii	29 May 1936
An Act to confer further powers upon the Uckfield Water Company to extend the limits for the supply of water by the Company and for other purposes. (Repealed by Uckfield Water Order 1948 (SI 1948/1906))
Post Office (Sites) Act 1936 (repealed)	26 Geo. 5 & 1 Edw. 8. c. xliii	14 July 1936
An Act to enable the Postmaster-General to acquire lands in London for the purpose of the Post Office and for the purpose of executing certain street works in the Metropolitan Borough of St. Pancras, and to acquire lands in Manchester and Hereford for the purpose of the Post Office, and for purposes connected with the matters aforesaid. (Repealed by Postal Services Act 2000 (Consequential Modifications to Local Enactments) Order 2003 (SI 2003/1542))
London and North Eastern Railway Order Confirmation Act 1936	26 Geo. 5 & 1 Edw. 8. c. xliv	14 July 1936
An Act to confirm a Provisional Order under the Private Legislation Procedure (Scotland) Acts 1899 and 1933 relating to the London and North Eastern Railway.
	London and North Eastern Railway Order 1936 Provisional Order to empower the London and North Eastern Railway Company to acquire additional lands in Scotland to make provision as to the tolls and charges leviable by the said Company on the Edinburgh and Glasgow Union Canal and for other purposes.	
Darlington Corporation Trolley Vehicles (Additional Routes) Order Confirmation Act 1936	26 Geo. 5 & 1 Edw. 8. c. xlv	14 July 1936
An Act to confirm a Provisional Order made by the Minister of Transport under the Darlington Corporation (Transport &c.) Act 1925 (Note: Darlington Corporation (Transport, &c.) Act 1925 (15 & 16 Geo. 5. c. cxvi)) relating to Darlington Corporation trolley vehicles.
	Darlington Corporation Trolley Vehicles (Additional Routes) Order 1936 Order authorising the mayor aldermen and burgesses of the county borough of Darlington to use trolley vehicles upon additional routes in the county borough of Darlington.	
Derby Corporation (Trolley Vehicles) Order Confirmation Act 1936 (repealed)	26 Geo. 5 & 1 Edw. 8. c. xlvi	14 July 1936
An Act to confirm a Provisional Order made by the Minister of Transport under the Derby Corporation Act 1930 (Note: Derby Corporation Act 1930 (20 & 21 Geo. 5. c. lxvi)) relating to Derby Corporation trolley vehicles. (Repealed by Derbyshire Act 1981 (c. xxxiv))
	Derby Corporation (Trolley Vehicles) Order 1936 Order authorising the mayor aldermen and burgesses of the borough of Derby to use trolley vehicles upon additional routes in the borough of Derby and the rural district of Shardlow.	
Doncaster Corporation (Trolley Vehicles) Order Confirmation Act 1936 (repealed)	26 Geo. 5 & 1 Edw. 8. c. xlvii	14 July 1936
An Act to confirm a Provisional Order made by the Minister of Transport under the Doncaster Corporation Act 1926 (Note: Doncaster Corporation Act 1926 (16 & 17 Geo. 5. c. xxvii)) relating to Doncaster Corporation trolley vehicles. (Repealed by Statute Law (Repeals) Act 1989 (c. 43))
	Doncaster Corporation (Trolley Vehicles) Order 1936 Order authorising the mayor aldermen and burgesses of the county borough of Doncaster to use trolley vehicles upon a certain route in the county borough of Doncaster.	
Pier and Harbour Order (Gloucester) Confirmation Act 1936	26 Geo. 5 & 1 Edw. 8. c. xlviii	14 July 1936
An Act to confirm a Provisional Order made by the Minister of Transport under the General Pier and Harbour Act 1861 (Note: General Pier and Harbour Act 1861 (24 & 25 Vict. c. 45)) relating to Gloucester.
	Gloucester Harbour Order 1936 Order to increase certain of the maximum rates leviable by the Gloucester Harbour Trustees and for other purposes.	
Reading Corporation (Trolley Vehicles) Order Confirmation Act 1936	26 Geo. 5 & 1 Edw. 8. c. xlix	14 July 1936
An Act to confirm a Provisional Order made by the Minister of Transport under the Reading Corporation Act 1935 (Note: Reading Corporation Act 1935 (25 & 26 Geo. 5. c. xc)) relating to Reading Corporation trolley vehicles.
	Reading Corporation (Trolley Vehicles) Order 1936 Order authorising the mayor aldermen and burgesses of the borough of Reading to use trolley vehicles upon additional routes in the borough of Reading and in the parish of Tilehurst in the rural district of Bradfield in the county of Berks.	
Gravesend and Milton Waterworks Act 1936	26 Geo. 5 & 1 Edw. 8. c. l	14 July 1936
An Act to confer further powers on the Gravesend and Milton Waterworks Company and for other purposes.
South Staffordshire Waterworks Act 1936	26 Geo. 5 & 1 Edw. 8. c. li	14 July 1936
An Act to authorise the South Staffordshire Waterworks Company to construct new works and to raise additional capital to extend the limits of supply of the Company and for other purposes.
Llanelly District Traction Act 1936	26 Geo. 5 & 1 Edw. 8. c. lii	14 July 1936
An Act to empower the Llanelly and District Electric Supply Company Limited to run trolley vehicles on certain routes to extend the Company's powers of running omnibuses and for other purposes.
Huddersfield Corporation (Trolley Vehicles) Act 1936 or the Huddersfield Corporation Act 1936 (repealed)	26 Geo. 5 & 1 Edw. 8. c. liii	14 July 1936
An Act to confer further powers upon the mayor aldermen and burgesses of the borough of Huddersfield in regard to their trolley vehicles undertaking and for other purposes. (Repealed by West Yorkshire Act 1980 (c. xiv))
Cornwall Electric Power Act 1936	26 Geo. 5 & 1 Edw. 8. c. liv	14 July 1936
An Act to confer further powers on the Cornwall Electric Power Company and for other purposes.
Kingston upon Hull Corporation Act 1936	26 Geo. 5 & 1 Edw. 8. c. lv	14 July 1936
An Act to empower the lord mayor aldermen and citizens of the city and county of Kingston upon Hull to provide and work trolley vehicle services and for other purposes.
Rickmansworth and Uxbridge Valley Water Act 1936	26 Geo. 5 & 1 Edw. 8. c. lvi	14 July 1936
An Act to authorise the Rickmansworth and Uxbridge Valley Water Company to construct new works and to raise additional capital and for other purposes.
Foundling Hospital Act 1936	26 Geo. 5 & 1 Edw. 8. c. lvii	14 July 1936
An Act to confer further powers on the Governors and Guardians of the Hospital for the Maintenance and Education of Exposed and Deserted Young Children commonly called the Foundling Hospital and for other purposes.
Fishguard and Goodwick Urban District Council Act 1936	26 Geo. 5 & 1 Edw. 8. c. lviii	14 July 1936
An Act to transfer to the urban district council of Fishguard and Goodwick the undertaking of the North Pembrokeshire Water and Gas Company to authorise the Council to construct new waterworks and supply water and gas and for other purposes.
London, Midland and Scottish Railway Act 1936	26 Geo. 5 & 1 Edw. 8. c. lix	14 July 1936
An Act London Midland and to empower the Scottish Railway Company to construct works and to acquire lands to authorise financial arrangements with respect to certain works and facilities to be provided by the said Company under an agreement with the Treasury to raise additional capital and for other purposes.
London County Council (General Powers) Act 1936	26 Geo. 5 & 1 Edw. 8. c. lx	14 July 1936
An Act to confer further powers upon the London County Council and other authorities and for other purposes.
North Metropolitan Electric Power Supply Act 1936	26 Geo. 5 & 1 Edw. 8. c. lxi	14 July 1936
An Act to confer further powers on the North Metropolitan Electric Power Supply Company and for other purposes.
Colne Valley and Northwood Electricity Act 1936	26 Geo. 5 & 1 Edw. 8. c. lxii	14 July 1936
An Act to synchronise the dates of purchase of the undertakings carried on by the Colne Valley Electric Supply Company Limited and the Northwood Electric Light and Power Company Limited to provide for those undertakings being purchaseable together by the London and Home Counties Joint Electricity Authority and to make consequential provisions with regard thereto and for other purposes.
Brentford and Chiswick Corporation Act 1936	26 Geo. 5 & 1 Edw. 8. c. lxiii	14 July 1936
An Act to confer further powers on the mayor aldermen and burgesses of the borough of Brentford and Chiswick in regard to their electricity and market undertakings and to make further and better provision for the improvement health and local government of their borough and for other purposes.
Cirencester Gas Act 1936	26 Geo. 5 & 1 Edw. 8. c. lxiv	14 July 1936
An Act to incorporate and confer powers on the Cirencester Gas Company.
Great Western Railway (Ealing and Shepherd's Bush Railway Extension) Act 1936	26 Geo. 5 & 1 Edw. 8. c. lxv	14 July 1936
An Act to empower the Great Western Railway Company to construct railways and to acquire lands to authorise financial arrangements with respect to certain works and facilities to be provided by the said Company under an agreement with the Treasury in connection with passenger transport services in the London Transport Area and to raise additional capital and for other purposes.
Stalybridge, Hyde, Mossley and Dukinfield Transport and Electricity Board Act 1936	26 Geo. 5 & 1 Edw. 8. c. lxvi	14 July 1936
An Act to authorise the Stalybridge Hyde Mossley and Dukinfield Tramways and Electricity Board to provide and work trolley vehicles to confer further powers on the Board in regard to their electricity undertaking and for other purposes.
Brighton Corporation Act 1936	26 Geo. 5 & 1 Edw. 8. c. lxvii	14 July 1936
An Act to confer powers upon the mayor aldermen and burgesses of the borough of Brighton with respect to the prevention of contamination of their water supply to confer further powers upon them in relation to their water undertaking and other matters to make better provision for the health local government and finance of the borough and for other purposes.
Lee Conservancy Catchment Board Act 1936	26 Geo. 5 & 1 Edw. 8. c. lxviii	14 July 1936
An Act to confer further powers on the Lee Conservancy Catchment Board and the Lee Conservancy Board to amend section 80 of the Land Drainage Act 1930 (Note: Land Drainage Act 1930 (20 & 21 Geo. 5. c. 44)) and for other purposes.
North-West Kent Joint Water Act 1936	26 Geo. 5 & 1 Edw. 8. c. lxix	14 July 1936
An Act to incorporate the Hartley Water Committee and to authorise them to construct works for affording an additional supply of water to the Mid Kent Water Company and the Gravesend and Milton Waterworks Company to incorporate the Cuxton Water Committee and to authorise them to construct works for affording an additional supply of water to the Mid Kent Water Company the Chatham and District Water Company the Higham and Hundred of Hoo Water Company and the mayor aldermen and citizens of the city of Rochester to authorise the construction of waterworks by each of the said companies and to confer further powers upon them and for other purposes.
Southern Railway Act 1936	26 Geo. 5 & 1 Edw. 8. c. lxx	14 July 1936
An Act to empower the Southern Railway Company to construct works and acquire lands to extend the time for the compulsory purchase of certain lands to empower the said Company and the London Midland and Scottish Railway Company to construct certain works to authorise financial arrangements with respect to certain works and facilities to be provided by the Southern Railway Company under an agreement with the Treasury to raise additional capital and for other purposes.
Ministry of Health Provisional Order Confirmation (Lancaster) Act 1936 (repealed)	26 Geo. 5 & 1 Edw. 8. c. lxxi	16 July 1936
An Act to confirm a Provisional Order of the Minister of Health relating to the borough of Lancaster. (Repealed by Lune Valley Water Board Order 1960 (SI 1960/2148))
	Lancaster (Water) Order 1936 Provisional order amending certain local Acts and provisional orders.	
Ministry of Health Provisional Order Confirmation (Ramsey and Saint Ives Joint Water District) Act 1936	26 Geo. 5 & 1 Edw. 8. c. lxxii	16 July 1936
An Act to confirm a Provisional Order of the Minister of Health relating to the Ramsey and Saint Ives Joint Water District.
	Ramsey and Saint Ives Joint Water Order 1936 Provisional order forming a united district under section 279 of the Public Health Act 1875.	
Ministry of Health Provisional Order Confirmation (Tees Valley Water Board) Act 1936	26 Geo. 5 & 1 Edw. 8. c. lxxiii	16 July 1936
An Act to confirm a Provisional Order of the Minister of Health relating to the Tees Valley Water Board.
	Tees Valley Water Order 1936 Provisional order altering a local Act (Note: Tees Valley Water Act 1930 (20 & 21 Geo. 5. c. lxix)) and a provisional order.	
Tring Gas Act 1936	26 Geo. 5 & 1 Edw. 8. c. lxxiv	16 July 1936
An Act to incorporate and confer powers on the Tring Gas Company.
Rochester Corporation Act 1936	26 Geo. 5 & 1 Edw. 8. c. lxxv	16 July 1936
An Act to empower the mayor aldermen and citizens of the city of Rochester to acquire a portion of the undertaking of the Higham and Hundred of Hoo Water Company to authorise the Corporation to construct waterworks and to confer further powers on the Corporation with regard to the supply of water to make further and better provisions for the health improvement and local government and finance of the city and for other purposes.
Buckingham's Charity (Dunstable) Scheme Confirmation Act 1936 (repealed)	26 Geo. 5 & 1 Edw. 8. c. lxxvi	31 July 1936
An Act to confirm a scheme of the Charity Commissioners for the application or management of the Charity of Arthur Frederick Buckingham for a cottage hospital, in the borough of Dunstable, in the county of Bedford. (Repealed by Statute Law (Repeals) Act 2013 (c. 2))
	Scheme for the application or management of the Charity of Arthur Frederick Buckingham for a cottage hospital in the borough of Dunstable in the county of Bedford founded by Will proved in the Principal Registry on the 31st May 1918 and comprised in a scheme of the Charity Commissioners of the 23rd February 1934.	
Aberdeen Corporation (Streets Buildings Sewers &c.) Order Confirmation Act 1936	26 Geo. 5 & 1 Edw. 8. c. lxxvii	31 July 1936
An Act to confirm a Provisional Order under the Private Legislation Procedure (Scotland) Acts and 1933 relating to Aberdeen Corporation (Streets Buildings Sewers &c.)
	Aberdeen Corporation (Streets Buildings Sewers &c.) Order 1936 Provisional Order to consolidate with amendments the Acts and Orders of or relating to the city and royal burgh of Aberdeen with respect to streets buildings sewers drains watercourses and other cognate matters and to confer further powers on the Corporation of the said city and royal burgh with reference to such matters to authorise the Corporation to construct additional sewers and relative works and for other purposes.	
Aberdeen Corporation Order Confirmation Act 1936 (repealed)	26 Geo. 5 & 1 Edw. 8. c. lxxviii	31 July 1936
An Act to confirm a Provisional Order under the Private Legislation Procedure (Scotland) Acts 1899 and 1933 relating to Aberdeen Corporation. (Repealed by Aberdeen Corporation (Administration Finance, &c.) Order Confirmation Act 1940 (3 & 4 Geo. 6. c. iii))
	Aberdeen Corporation Order 1936 Provisional Order to authorise the lord provost magistrates and town council of the city and royal burgh of Aberdeen to construct additional waterworks and to confer further powers on them in connection with their water undertaking to authorise the Corporation to construct street improvements a bridge over the river Dee and new tramways to empower the Corporation to provide a bathing pool on a portion of the links to confer powers on the Corporation with respect to the sale of coal &c. to authorise them to borrow further money and to make further provision with respect to the local government health and finance of the said city and for other purposes.	
Provisional Orders (Marriages Confirmation) Act 1936 (repealed)	26 Geo. 5 & 1 Edw. 8. c. lxxix	31 July 1936
An Act to confirm certain Provisional Orders made by one of His Majesty's Principal Secretaries of State under the Marriages Validity (Provisional Orders) Acts 1905 (Note: Provisional Order (Marriages) Act 1905 (5 Edw. 7. c. 23)) and 1924. (Note: Marriages Validity (Provisional Orders) Act 1924 (14 & 15 Geo. 5. c. 20)) (Repealed by Statute Law (Repeals) Act 1977 (c. 18))
	Saint James Manston Order.	
	Saint John Clerkenwell Order.	
	Lower Lemington Order.	
Pier and Harbour Order (Cowes) Confirmation Act 1936	26 Geo. 5 & 1 Edw. 8. c. lxxx	31 July 1936
An Act to confirm a Provisional Order made by the Minister of Transport under the General Pier and Harbour Act 1861 relating to Cowes.
	Cowes Harbour Order 1936 Order to authorise the Commissioners for the Harbour of Cowes to construct works to borrow money to demand new and increased rates dues and charges to enable to Cowes Urban District Council to contribute to the revenues &c. of the Commissioners to alter the constitution of the Commissioners and for other purposes.	
Pier and Harbour Order (Keyhaven) Confirmation Act 1936	26 Geo. 5 & 1 Edw. 8. c. lxxxi	31 July 1936
An Act to confirm a Provisional Order made by the Minister of Transport under the General Pier and Harbour Act 1861 relating to Keyhaven.
	Keyhaven Pier Order 1936 Order empowering the Isle of Wight Ferry Company Limited to construct a pier in the borough of Lymington to levy rates and dues in respect thereof and for other purposes.	
Pier and Harbour Order (Maryport) Confirmation Act 1936 (repealed)	26 Geo. 5 & 1 Edw. 8. c. lxxxii	31 July 1936
An Act to confirm a Provisional Order made by the Minister of Transport under the General Pier and Harbour Act 1861 relating to Maryport. (Repealed by Maryport Harbour Revision Order 2007 (SI 2007/3463))
	Maryport Harbour Order 1936 Order to increase certain of the maximum rates tolls and charges leviable by the Commissioners for the Harbour of Maryport and for other purposes.	
Pier and Harbour Order (Paignton) Confirmation Act 1936 (repealed)	26 Geo. 5 & 1 Edw. 8. c. lxxxiii	31 July 1936
An Act to confirm a Provisional Order made by the Minister of Transport under the General Pier and Harbour Act 1861 relating to Paignton. (Repealed by Tor Bay Harbour Act 1970 (c. liii))
	Paignton Harbour Order 1936. Order for the transfer to the urban district council of Paighton of the undertaking known as the Paington Harbour to confer powers on the said council with reference thereto and the maintenance management and improvement thereof and for other purposes.	
Pier and Harbour Order (Whitley Bay) Confirmation Act 1936	26 Geo. 5 & 1 Edw. 8. c. lxxxiv	31 July 1936
An Act to confirm a Provisional Order made by the Minister of Transport under the General Pier and Harbour Act 1861 relating to Whitley Bay.
	Whitley Bay Pier Order 1936 Order for the construction of a pier at Whitley Bay in the county of Northumberland and the levy of rates and charges in connection therewith and for other purposes.	
Sea Fisheries (Truro) Order Confirmation Act 1936	26 Geo. 5 & 1 Edw. 8. c. lxxxv	31 July 1936
An Act to confirm a Provisional Order made by the Minister of Agriculture and Fisheries under the Sea Fisheries Act 1868 (Note: Sea Fisheries Act 1868 (31 & 32 Vict. c. 45)) for the regulation by the Corporation of the city of Truro of an oyster and mussel fishery in part of the Truro River in the county of Cornwall.
	Truro Port Fishery Order 1936 Order for the regulation by the Corporation of the city of Truro of an oyster and mussel fishery in part of the Truro River in the county of Cornwall.	
Sea Fisheries (Ribble) Order Confirmation Act 1936	26 Geo. 5 & 1 Edw. 8. c. lxxxvi	31 July 1936
An Act to confirm a Provisional Order made by the Minister of Agriculture and Fisheries under the Sea Fisheries Act 1868 for the establishment and maintenance of a several mussel fishery in the estuary of the river Ribble in the county of Lancaster.
	Ribble Mussel Fishery Order 1936 Order for the establishment and maintenance of a several mussel fishery in the estuary of the river Ribble in the county of Lancaster.	
Land Drainage (Witham and Steeping Rivers) Provisional Order Confirmation Act 1936	26 Geo. 5 & 1 Edw. 8. c. lxxxvii	31 July 1936
An Act to confirm a Provisional Order made by the Minister of Agriculture and Fisheries relating to a Scheme submitted by the Witham and Steeping Rivers Catchment Board under section four (1) (b) of the Land Drainage Act 1930.
	Witham and Steeping Rivers Catchment Board Order 1936	
	Witham and Steeping Rivers Catchment Board (Reorganisation of Districts) Scheme No. 8 1935	
Land Drainage (River Stour (Kent)) Provisional Order Confirmation Act 1936	26 Geo. 5 & 1 Edw. 8. c. lxxxviii	31 July 1936
An Act to confirm a Provisional Order made by the Minister of Agriculture and Fisheries relating to a Scheme submitted by the River Stour (Kent) Catchment Board under section four (1) (b) of the Land Drainage Act 1930.
	River Stour (Kent) Catchment Board Order 1936	
	River Stour (Kent) Catchment Board Scheme.	
Grimsby Corporation (Trolley Vehicles) Order Confirmation Act 1936	26 Geo. 5 & 1 Edw. 8. c. lxxxix	31 July 1936
An Act to confirm a Provisional Order made by the Minister of Transport under the Grimsby Corporation Act 1921 (Note: Grimsby Corporation Act 1921 (11 & 12 Geo. 5. c. lxxvi)) relating to Grimsby Corporation trolley vehicles.
	Grimsby Corporation (Trolley Vehicles) Order 1936 Order authorising the mayor aldermen and burgesses of the county borough of Grimsby to use trolley vehicles upon additional routes in the borough of Grimsby and the urban district of Cleethorpes.	
Ministry of Health Provisional Order Confirmation (Leeds) Act 1936 (repealed)	26 Geo. 5 & 1 Edw. 8. c. xc	31 July 1936
An Act to confirm a Provisional Order of the Minister of Health relating to the city of Leeds. (Repealed by West Yorkshire Act 1980 (c. xiv))
	Leeds Order 1936 Provisional order amending the Leeds Corporation (Consolidation) Act 1905. (Note: Leeds Corporation (Consolidation) Act 1905 (5 Edw. 7. c. i))	
Ministry of Health Provisional Order Confirmation (Essex) Act 1936	26 Geo. 5 & 1 Edw. 8. c. xci	31 July 1936
An Act to confirm a Provisional Order of the Minister of Health relating to the county of Essex.
	County of Essex Order 1936 Provisional order to enable the county council of Essex to put in force the compulsory clauses of the Lands Clauses Acts.	
Ministry of Health Provisional Order Confirmation (North Herts Joint Hospital District) Act 1936	26 Geo. 5 & 1 Edw. 8. c. xcii	31 July 1936
An Act to confirm a Provisional Order of the Minister of Health relating to the North Herts Joint Hospital District.
	North Herts Joint Hospital Order 1936 Provisional order altering the Hitchin Rural and Letchworth Urban Joint Hospital Order 1919.	
Ministry of Health Provisional Order Confirmation (Helston and Porthleven Water) Act 1936	26 Geo. 5 & 1 Edw. 8. c. xciii	31 July 1936
An Act to confirm a Provisional Order of the Minister of Health relating to the Helston and Porthleven Water Company.
	Helston and Portleven Water Order 1936 Provisional Order under the Gas and Water Works Facilities Act 1870 (Note: Gas and Water Works Facilities Act 1870 (33 & 34 Vict. c. 70)) and the Gas and Water Works Facilities Act 1870 Amendment Act 1873 (Note: Gas and Water Works Facilities Act 1870 Amendment Act 1873 (36 & 37 Vict. c. 89)) empowering the Helston and Porthleven Water Company to raise additional capital to alter the rates and charges leviable by the Company and for other purposes.	
Ministry of Health Provisional Order Confirmation (Heathfield and District Water) Act 1936	26 Geo. 5 & 1 Edw. 8. c. xciv	31 July 1936
An Act to confirm a Provisional Order of the Minister of Health relating to the Heathfield and District Water Company.
	Heathfield and District Water Order 1936 Provisional Order under the Gas and Water Works Facilities Act 1870 and the Gas and Water Works Facilities Act 1870 Amendment Act 1873 empowering the Heathfield and District Water Company to extend their limits for the supply of water to authorise them to raise additional capital and for other purposes.	
Ministry of Health Provisional Order Confirmation (West Hartlepool) Act 1936 (repealed)	26 Geo. 5 & 1 Edw. 8. c. xcv	31 July 1936
An Act to confirm a Provisional Order of the Minister of Health relating to the borough of West Hartlepool. (Repealed by County of Cleveland Act 1987 (c. ix))
	West Hartlepool Order 1936 Provisional order for partially repealing a local Act. (Note: West Hartlepool Extension and Improvement Act 1870 (33 & 34 Vict. c. cxiii))	
Ministry of Health Provisional Order Confirmation (Plympton Saint Mary) Act 1936	26 Geo. 5 & 1 Edw. 8. c. xcvi	31 July 1936
An Act to confirm a Provisional Order of the Minister of Health relating to the rural district of Plympton Saint Mary.
	Plympton Saint Mary Order 1936 Provisional order altering certain local Acts.	
Ministry of Health Provisional Order Confirmation (Barnsley) Act 1936	26 Geo. 5 & 1 Edw. 8. c. xcvii	31 July 1936
An Act to confirm a Provisional Order of the Minister of Health relating to the borough of Barnsley.
	Barnsley Order 1936 Provisional Order amending the Barnsley Corporation Act 1923. (Note: Barnsley Corporation Act 1923 (13 & 14 Geo. 5. c. lxxxix))	
Ministry of Health Provisional Order Confirmation (St. Helens) Act 1936 (repealed)	26 Geo. 5 & 1 Edw. 8. c. xcviii	31 July 1936
An Act to confirm a Provisional Order of the Minister of Health relating to the borough of St. Helens. (Repealed by County of Merseyside Act 1980 (c. x))
	St. Helens Order 1936 Provisional order amending the St. Helens Corporation Act 1911. (Note: St. Helens Corporation Act 1911 (1 & 2 Geo. 5. c. cxvii))	
Ministry of Health Provisional Order Confirmation (Ripon) Act 1936	26 Geo. 5 & 1 Edw. 8. c. xcix	31 July 1936
An Act to confirm a Provisional Order of the Minister of Health relating to the city of Ripon.
	Ripon Order 1936 Provisional order partially altering a local Act (Note: Ripon Corporation Act 1886 (49 & 50 Vict. c. lxvii)) and repealing certain confirming Acts and orders.	
Epsom and Walton Downs Regulation Act 1936 (repealed)	26 Geo. 5 & 1 Edw. 8. c. c	31 July 1936
An Act to incorporate a body of Conservators for the regulation of Epsom Downs and Walton Downs and to confer powers on the owners of such Downs and on the Epsom and Ewell Urban District Council and for other purposes. (Repealed by Epsom and Walton Downs Regulation Act 1984 (c. ix))
Great Western Railway (Additional Powers) Act 1936	26 Geo. 5 & 1 Edw. 8. c. ci	31 July 1936
An Act to empower the Great Western Railway Company to construct railways and other works in connection with their undertaking and to acquire lands to authorise financial arrangements with respect to certain works and facilities to be provided by the said Company under an agreement with the Treasury to abandon certain railways to raise additional capital and for other purposes.
York Gas Act 1936	26 Geo. 5 & 1 Edw. 8. c. cii	31 July 1936
An Act to confer upon the York Gas Company powers with reference to the making of provision for supplies of gas in certain cases and for other purposes.
London County Council (Money) Act 1936 (repealed)	26 Geo. 5 & 1 Edw. 8. c. ciii	31 July 1936
An Act to regulate the expenditure on capital account and lending of money by the London County Council during the financial period from the first day of April one thousand nine hundred and thirty-six to the thirtieth day of September one thousand nine hundred and thirty-seven and for other purposes. (Repealed by London County Council (Loans) Act 1955 (4 & 5 Eliz. 2. c. xxvi))
Gas Light and Coke Company's (No. 1) Act 1936	26 Geo. 5 & 1 Edw. 8. c. civ	31 July 1936
An Act to empower the Gas Light and Coke Company to raise additional capital and for other purposes.
South Metropolitan Gas Act 1936	26 Geo. 5 & 1 Edw. 8. c. cv	31 July 1936
An Act to extend the limits of supply of the South Metropolitan Gas Company and for other purposes.
South Suburban Gas Act 1936	26 Geo. 5 & 1 Edw. 8. c. cvi	31 July 1936
An Act to confer further powers upon the South Suburban Gas Company and for other purposes.
Wrexham and East Denbighshire Water Act 1936	26 Geo. 5 & 1 Edw. 8. c. cvii	31 July 1936
An Act to authorise the Wrexham and East Denbighshire Water Company to construct new waterworks to alter the limits of supply of the Company to enlarge their powers in relation to the raising of money and for other purposes.
London and Middlesex (Improvements, &c.) Act 1936	26 Geo. 5 & 1 Edw. 8. c. cviii	31 July 1936
An Act to empower the county councils of the administrative counties of London and Middlesex to make new streets street widenings and other works for the improvement of traffic facilities between West Cromwell Road and Great West Road in the counties of London and Middlesex respectively to make further provision in regard to the issue of precepts and the appointment of justices' clerks in Middlesex and for other purposes.
Coventry Corporation Act 1936	26 Geo. 5 & 1 Edw. 8. c. cix	31 July 1936
An Act to empower the mayor aldermen and citizens of the city of Coventry to construct street and road works to apply the provisions of the Coventry Corporation Act 1930 (Note: Coventry Corporation Act 1930 (20 & 21 Geo. 5. c. lxxxvi)) enabling the Corporation to levy frontage charges towards the cost of the bye-pass road authorised by that Act to the substituted roads authorised by this Act and to make other provision with regard to those charges to authorise the construction of waterworks and to enact further provisions with regard to water supply to extend the limits of the Corporation for the supply of gas to confer further powers on the Corporation with regard to the health improvement and good government of the city and for other purposes.
Thornton Cleveleys Improvement Act 1936	26 Geo. 5 & 1 Edw. 8. c. cx	31 July 1936
An Act to provide that separate sewers for sewage and surface water shall be required in the Thornton Cleveleys Urban District to extend the time for the construction by the Thornton Cleveleys Urban District Council of part of the promenade authorised by the Thornton Urban District Council Act 1923 (Note: Thornton Urban District Council Act 1923 (13 & 14 Geo. 5. c. lxxiv)) to extend the limits of the Council for the supply of gas to make further provision with regard to the improvement of the seashore in the district and with regard to the health improvement and good government of the district and for other purposes.
Wolverhampton Corporation Act 1936	26 Geo. 5 & 1 Edw. 8. c. cxi	31 July 1936
An Act to empower the mayor aldermen and burgesses of the borough of Wolverhampton to construct street improvements and waterworks and to acquire lands for those and other purposes to confer further powers upon them with regard to the provision and working of trolley vehicles to provide for the transfer to the Corporation of the undertaking of the Wolverhampton General Cemetery Company and to authorise the establishment of a crematorium to extend the area for the supply of water by the Corporation and to make further provision with regard to their water and electricity undertakings and the health local government and improvement of the borough and for other purposes.
Dalton-in-Furness Urban District Council Act 1936	26 Geo. 5 & 1 Edw. 8. c. cxii	31 July 1936
An Act to provide for the transfer to the urban district council of Dalton-in-Furness of the Dalton gasworks to confer further powers upon that Council with respect to their gas and other undertakings and to make further provision in regard to the health local government improvement and finance of the urban district of Dalton-in-Furness and for other purposes.
Hereford Corporation Act 1936	26 Geo. 5 & 1 Edw. 8. c. cxiii	31 July 1936
An Act to extend the limits within which the mayor aldermen and citizens of the city of Hereford may supply water and gas to confer further powers upon the said mayor aldermen and citizens with reference to their water gas and markets undertakings to make further provision with regard to the health local government and improvement of the city and for other purposes.
Solihull Urban District Council Act 1936 (repealed)	26 Geo. 5 & 1 Edw. 8. c. cxiv	31 July 1936
An Act to confer further powers on the urban district council of Solihull for and in connection with the improvement health good government and finances of their district and for other purposes. (Repealed by West Midlands County Council Act 1980 (c. xi))
Merton and Morden Urban District Council Act 1936	26 Geo. 5 & 1 Edw. 8. c. cxv	31 July 1936
An Act to confer further powers on the Urban District Council of Merton and Morden for and in connection with the improvement health good government and finances of their district; to confer powers on the council in relation to street trading, and for other purposes.
Bognor Regis Urban District Council Act 1936	26 Geo. 5 & 1 Edw. 8. c. cxvi	31 July 1936
An Act to confer further powers on the Urban District Council of Bognor Regis in regard to their water undertaking and to make further and better provision for the improvement health local government and finance of their district; and for other purposes.
Ilfracombe Urban District Council Act 1936	26 Geo. 5 & 1 Edw. 8. c. cxvii	31 July 1936
An Act to authorise the Urban District Council of Ilfracombe to construct additional waterworks council Bill and to confer further powers upon the Council with regard to their water undertaking; to make further and better provision for the improvement health and local government and finance of the district, and for other purposes.
Manchester Corporation Act 1936	26 Geo. 5 & 1 Edw. 8. c. cxviii	31 July 1936
An Act to empower the Lord Mayor Aldermen and Citizens of the City of Manchester to provide trolley vehicle services within and without the said city; and for other purposes.
Dover Corporation Act 1936 (repealed)	26 Geo. 5 & 1 Edw. 8. c. cxix	31 July 1936
An Act to empower the mayor aldermen and burgesses of the borough of Dover to execute street works to abandon their tramways and light railways and to provide and work public service vehicles to confirm an agreement between the East Kent Road Car Company Limited and the said mayor aldermen and burgesses with reference to the running of such vehicles to make further provision in regard to the finances Of the borough and for other purposes. (Repealed by County of Kent Act 1981 (c. xviii))
Birmingham Corporation Act 1936 (repealed)	26 Geo. 5 & 1 Edw. 8. c. cxx	31 July 1936
An Act to confer further powers upon the Lord Mayor, Aldermen, and Citizens of the City of Birmingham, to make further provision for the protection of their aerodrome and for other purposes. (Repealed by West Midlands County Council Act 1980 (c. xi))
Mortlake Crematorium Act 1936	26 Geo. 5 & 1 Edw. 8. c. cxxi	31 July 1936
An Act to constitute a joint board comprising representatives of the Hammersmith Borough Council and the corporations of Acton Barnes and Richmond to authorise the Board to provide and maintain a crematorium and for other purposes.
Liverpool Corporation Act 1936	26 Geo. 5 & 1 Edw. 8. c. cxxii	31 July 1936
An Act to authorise the Corporation of Liverpool to construct street works and to acquire certain lands to confer further powers upon them with respect to their waterworks and electricity undertakings to make better provision for the health local government and finance of the city and for other purposes.
Hornchurch Urban District Council Act 1936	26 Geo. 5 & 1 Edw. 8. c. cxxiii	31 July 1936
An Act to make further and better provision for the improvement health local government and finance of the Urban District Of Hornchurch, and for other purposes.
Manchester Ship Canal Act 1936	26 Geo. 5 & 1 Edw. 8. c. cxxiv	31 July 1936
An Act to empower the Manchester Ship Canal Company to construct certain railways to extend the time limited for the construction by the Company of certain other railways to authorise the Company to abandon the Manchester and Salford Junction Canal and for other purposes.
Axbridge Rural District Council Act 1936 (repealed)	26 Geo. 5 & 1 Edw. 8. c. cxxv	31 July 1936
An Act to provide that all expenses of the Axbridge Rural District Council of providing supplies of water in their district and of constructing and maintaining works therefor so far as such expenses are not defrayed out of water rates rents and charges shall be charged on the general rate fund and general rate of the district; to make further provision with regard to the supply of water in the district, and for other purposes. (Repealed by Bristol Waterworks (Axbridge) Order 1958 (SI 1958/553))
London and North Eastern Railway (London Transport) Act 1936	26 Geo. 5 & 1 Edw. 8. c. cxxvi	31 July 1936
An Act to empower the London and North Eastern Railway Company to widen certain of their railways; to construct other works in connection with their undertaking and to acquire lands; to revive the powers and extend the time for the completion of certain railways; to raise money for or in connection with passenger transport services in the London Transport Area, and for other purposes.
London and North Eastern Railway (General Powers) Act 1936	26 Geo. 5 & 1 Edw. 8. c. cxxvii	31 July 1936
An Act to empower the London and North Eastern Railway Company to widen certain of their railways; to construct other works in connection with their undertaking and to acquire lands; to authorise financial arrangements with respect to certain works and facilities to be provided by the said Company under an agreement with the Treasury; to raise additional capital; to dispose of or close the Grantham Canal, and for other purposes.
Gas Light and Coke Company's (No. 2) Act 1936	26 Geo. 5 & 1 Edw. 8. c. cxxviii	31 July 1936
An Act to confer upon the Gas Light and Coke Company powers with reference to the making of provision for supplies of gas in certain cases, and for other purposes.
Cheltenham and Gloucester Joint Water Board, &c Act 1936	26 Geo. 5 & 1 Edw. 8. c. cxxix	31 July 1936
An Act to establish a Joint Board consisting of representatives of the Corporations of Cheltenham and Gloucester; to transfer to the Board certain waterworks of the Cheltenham Corporation; to authorise the Board to construct works and supply water; to confer further powers upon the Cheltenham Corporation and the Gloucester Corporation with respect to the supply of water and to extend the limits for the supply of water by the Cheltenham Corporation and the Gloucester Corporation; to confer further powers upon the Cheltenham Corporation, and for other purposes.
Surrey County Council Act 1936	26 Geo. 5 & 1 Edw. 8. c. cxxx	31 July 1936
An Act to authorise the Surrey County Council to execute works for the improvement of Beverley Brook and Pyl Brook and other brooks and streams in the county of Surrey to confer further powers on the Council and to enact further provisions for the good government and administration and the preservation of the amenities of the county to enact provisions with respect to the control of wrestling entertainments and swimming baths and with respect to town planning and roads within the county and for other purposes.
London Passenger Transport Act 1936	26 Geo. 5 & 1 Edw. 8. c. cxxxi	31 July 1936
An Act to empower the London Passenger Transport Board to provide certain services of trolley vehicles to construct new works to acquire lands to raise additional moneys to confer further powers on the Board and for other purposes.

== 1 Edw. 8 & 1 Geo. 6 ==
The second session of the 37th Parliament of the United Kingdom, which met from 3 November 1936 until 22 October 1937.

This session was also traditionally cited as 1 Ed. 8 & 1 Geo. 6, 1 Ed. 8 & 1 G. 6 or 1 E. 8 & 1 G. 6.

=== Public general acts ===
Short title	Citation	Royal assent
Long title
Merchant Shipping (Carriage of Munitions to Spain) Act 1936 (repealed)	1 Edw. 8 & 1 Geo. 6. c. 1	3 December 1936
An Act to prohibit the discharge in or transhipment for Spanish territory of weapons and munitions of war and other articles from certain ships, to prohibit the carriage in such ships of such articles consigned to or destined for Spanish territory, and for purposes connected therewith. (Repealed by Statute Law Revision Act 1950 (14 Geo. 6. c. 6))
Railway Freight Rebates Act 1936 (repealed)	1 Edw. 8 & 1 Geo. 6. c. 2	11 December 1936
An Act to amend the Eleventh Schedule to the Local Government Act, 1929, (Note: Local Government Act 1929 (19 & 20 Geo. 5. c. 17)) and to make provision for meeting certain liabilities of the Railway Freight Rebates Fund in respect of the period beginning with the first day of April, nineteen hundred and thirty-one, and ending with the thirty-first day of December, nineteen hundred and thirty-six. (Repealed by Transport Charges &c. (Miscellaneous Provisions) Act 1954 (2 & 3 Eliz. 2. c. 64))
His Majesty's Declaration of Abdication Act 1936 (Note: This was the last public act of the reign of King Edward VIII.)	1 Edw. 8 & 1 Geo. 6. c. 3	11 December 1936
An Act to give effect to His Majesty's declaration of abdication; and for purposes connected therewith.
Expiring Laws Continuance Act 1936 (Note: This was the first public act of the reign of King George VI.) (repealed)	1 Edw. 8 & 1 Geo. 6. c. 4	18 December 1936
An Act to continue certain expiring laws. (Repealed by Statute Law Revision Act 1950 (14 Geo. 6. c. 6))
Trunk Roads Act 1936 (repealed)	1 Edw. 8 & 1 Geo. 6. c. 5	18 December 1936
An Act to provide that the Minister of Transport shall be the highway authority for the principal roads in Great Britain which constitute the national system of routes for through traffic; to make consequential amendments in the law relating to highways; and for purposes connected with the matters aforesaid. (Repealed by Statute Law (Repeals) Act 1989 (c. 43))
Public Order Act 1936	1 Edw. 8 & 1 Geo. 6. c. 6	18 December 1936
An Act to prohibit the wearing of uniforms in connection with political objects and the maintenance by private persons of associations of military or similar character; and to make further provision for the preservation of public order on the occasion of public processions and meetings and in public places.

=== Local acts ===
Short title	Citation	Royal assent
Long title
Airdrie Burgh Extension &c. Order Confirmation Act 1936	1 Edw. 8 & 1 Geo. 6. c. i	11 December 1936
An Act to confirm a Provisional Order under the Private Legislation Procedure (Scotland) Act 1936 (Note: Private Legislation Procedure (Scotland) Act 1936 (26 Geo. 5 & 1 Edw. 8. c. 52)) relating to Airdrie Burgh Extension &c.
	Airdrie Burgh Extension Order 1936 Provisional Order to extend the municipal and police boundaries of the burgh of Airdrie in the county of Lanark to confer further powers on the provost magistrates and councillors of the said burgh with regard to their gas undertaking to authorise them to borrow money to make provision with respect to the local government health and finance of the burgh and for other purposes.	
Edinburgh Chartered Accountants Annuity &c. Fund (Consolidation and Amendment) Order Confirmation Act 1936 (repealed)	1 Edw. 8 & 1 Geo. 6. c. ii	11 December 1936
An Act to confirm a Provisional Order under the Private Legislation Procedure (Scotland) Act 1936 relating to Edinburgh Chartered Accountants Annuity &c. Fund. (Repealed by Statute Law (Repeals) Act 1986)
	Edinburgh Chartered Accountants Annuity &c. Fund (Consolidation and Amendment) Order 1936 Provisional Order to consolidate and amend the provisions of the Edinburgh Chartered Accountants Annuity &c. Fund Order 1924 and the Edinburgh Chartered Accountants Annuity &c. Fund Order 1927 and for other purposes.	

== See also ==
- List of acts of the Parliament of the United Kingdom
