= List of statutory rules of Northern Ireland, 1996 =

This is an incomplete list of statutory rules of Northern Ireland in 1996.

== 1-100 ==
- Disability Discrimination Act 1995 (Commencement No. 1) Order (Northern Ireland) 1996 (S.R. 1996 No. 1)
- Roads (Speed Limit) Order (Northern Ireland) 1996 (S.R. 1996 No. 2)
- Royal Ulster Constabulary Pensions (Amendment) Regulations 1996 (S.R. 1996 No. 4)
- Royal Ulster Constabulary Reserve (Full-Time) Pensions (Amendment) Regulations 1996 (S.R. 1996 No. 5)
- Taxis (Newtownards) Bye-Laws (Northern Ireland) 1996 (S.R. 1996 No. 6)
- Hill Livestock (Compensatory Allowances) (Amendment) Regulations (Northern Ireland) 1996 (S.R. 1996 No. 7)
- Marking of Animals Order (Northern Ireland) 1996 (S.R. 1996 No. 9)
- Judicial Pensions (Additional Voluntary Contributions) (Amendment) Regulations (Northern Ireland) 1996 (S.R. 1996 No. 10)
- Social Security (Persons from Abroad) (Miscellaneous Amendments) Regulations (Northern Ireland) 1996 (S.R. 1996 No. 11)
- Motor Vehicle Testing (Extension) Order (Northern Ireland) 1996 (S.R. 1996 No. 12)
- Northern Ireland Disability Council Regulations (Northern Ireland) 1996 (S.R. 1996 No. 13)
- Health and Safety (Medical Fees) Regulations (Northern Ireland) 1996 (S.R. 1996 No. 14)
- Children (1995 Order) (Commencement No. 2) Order (Northern Ireland) 1996 (S.R. 1996 No. 15)
- Diseases of Fish (Control) Regulations (Northern Ireland) 1996 (S.R. 1996 No. 16)
- Price Marking (Amendment) Order (Northern Ireland) 1996 (S.R. 1996 No. 17)
- Plant Health (Wood and Bark) (Amendment) Order (Northern Ireland) 1996 (S.R. 1996 No. 18)
- County Court (Amendment) Rules (Northern Ireland) 1996 (S.R. 1996 No. 19)
- Homefirst Community Health and Social Services Trust (Establishment) Order (Northern Ireland) 1996 (S.R. 1996 No. 20)
- Health and Safety (Repeals and Revocations) Regulations (Northern Ireland) 1996 (S.R. 1996 No. 21)
- Litter (Statutory Undertakers) (Designation and Relevant Land) Order (Northern Ireland) 1996 (S.R. 1996 No. 22)
- Air Quality Standards (Amendment) Regulations (Northern Ireland) 1996 (S.R. 1996 No. 23)
- Social Security (Adjudication) and Child Support (Amendment) Regulations (Northern Ireland) 1996 (S.R. 1996 No. 24)
- Registered Rents (Increase) Order (Northern Ireland) 1996 (S.R. 1996 No. 25)
- Jobseekers (1995 Order) (Commencement No. 1) Order (Northern Ireland) 1996 (S.R. 1996 No. 26)
- Traffic Weight Restriction (Millbay Road, Islandmagee) Order (Northern Ireland) 1996 (S.R. 1996 No. 27)
- Employer's Contributions Re-imbursement Regulations (Northern Ireland) 1996 (S.R. 1996 No. 30)
- Driver & Vehicle Testing Agency Trading Fund Order (Northern Ireland) 1996 (S.R. 1996 No. 32)
- Roads (Speed Limit) (No. 2) Order (Northern Ireland) 1996 (S.R. 1996 No. 33)
- Roads (Speed Limit) (No. 3) Order (Northern Ireland) 1996 (S.R. 1996 No. 34)
- Traffic Weight Restriction (British Road, Aldergrove, Crumlin) Order (Northern Ireland) 1996 (S.R. 1996 No. 37)
- Public Use of the Records (Management and Fees) Rules (Northern Ireland) 1996 (S.R. 1996 No. 38)
- Experimental Speed Limit (Route A1) (Continuation) Order (Northern Ireland) 1996 (S.R. 1996 No. 39)
- Criminal Justice Act 1988 (Reviews of Sentencing) Order (Northern Ireland) 1996 (S.R. 1996 No. 40)
- Planning (Fees) (Amendment) Regulations (Northern Ireland) 1996 (S.R. 1996 No. 41)
- Temporary Speed Limit (Sydenham By-Pass, Route A2, Belfast) (Continuation) (Revocation) Order (Northern Ireland) 1996 (S.R. 1996 No. 42)
- One-Way Traffic (Belfast) (Amendment) Order (Northern Ireland) 1996 (S.R. 1996 No. 44)
- One-Way Traffic (Ballymena) (Amendment) Order (Northern Ireland) 1996 (S.R. 1996 No. 45)
- Rates (Regional Rate) Order (Northern Ireland) 1996 (S.R. 1996 No. 46)
- Spreadable Fats (Marketing Standards) Regulations (Northern Ireland) 1996 (S.R. 1996 No. 47)
- Sweeteners in Food Regulations (Northern Ireland) 1996 (S.R. 1996 No. 48)
- Colours in Food Regulations (Northern Ireland) 1996 (S.R. 1996 No. 49)
- Miscellaneous Food Additives Regulations (Northern Ireland) 1996 (S.R. 1996 No. 50)
- Bread and Flour Regulations (Northern Ireland) 1996 (S.R. 1996 No. 51)
- Cheese and Cream Regulations (Northern Ireland) 1996 (S.R. 1996 No. 52)
- Food (Miscellaneous Revocations and Amendments) Regulations (Northern Ireland) 1996 (S.R. 1996 No. 53)
- Magistrates' Courts (Drug Trafficking Act 1994) Rules (Northern Ireland) 1996 (S.R. 1996 No. 54)
- Magistrates' Courts (Child Abduction and Custody) (Amendment) Rules (Northern Ireland) 1996 (S.R. 1996 No. 55)
- Magistrates' Courts (Family Law Act 1986) (Amendment) Rules (Northern Ireland) 1996 (S.R. 1996 No. 56)
- Social Security (Industrial Injuries and Diseases) (Miscellaneous Amendments) Regulations (Northern Ireland) 1996 (S.R. 1996 No. 57)
- Social Security (Contributions) (Amendment) Regulations (Northern Ireland) 1996 (S.R. 1996 No. 58)
- Bus Lane (Queen's Square, Belfast) Order (Northern Ireland) 1996 (S.R. 1996 No. 59)
- One-Way Traffic (Belfast) (Amendment No. 2) Order (Northern Ireland) 1996 (S.R. 1996 No. 60)
- Social Security (Incapacity for Work) (General) (Amendment) Regulations (Northern Ireland) 1996 (S.R. 1996 No. 61)
- Guaranteed Minimum Pensions Increase Order (Northern Ireland) 1996 (S.R. 1996 No. 62)
- One-Way Traffic (Ballymena) (Amendment No. 2) Order (Northern Ireland) 1996 (S.R. 1996 No. 63)
- Child Support (Maintenance Assessments and Special Cases) and Social Security (Claims and Payments) (Amendment) Regulations (Northern Ireland) 1996 (S.R. 1996 No. 65)
- Traffic Signs (Amendment) Regulations (Northern Ireland) 1996 (S.R. 1996 No. 69)
- Crown Court (Children's Evidence) (Dismissal of Transferred Charges) Rules (Northern Ireland) 1996 (S.R. 1996 No. 70)
- Crown Court (Amendment) Rules (Northern Ireland) 1996 (S.R. 1996 No. 71)
- Social Security (Contributions) (Re-rating and Northern Ireland National Insurance Fund Payments) Order (Northern Ireland) 1996 (S.R. 1996 No. 72)
- Social Security Benefits Up-rating Order (Northern Ireland) 1996 (S.R. 1996 No. 73)
- Social Security Benefits Up-rating Regulations (Northern Ireland) 1996 (S.R. 1996 No. 74)
- Social Security (Industrial Injuries) (Dependency) (Permitted Earnings Limits) Order (Northern Ireland) 1996 (S.R. 1996 No. 75)
- Workmen's Compensation (Supplementation) (Amendment) Regulations (Northern Ireland) 1996 (S.R. 1996 No. 76)
- Statutory Maternity Pay (Compensation of Employers) (Amendment) Regulations (Northern Ireland) 1996 (S.R. 1996 No. 77)
- Income Support (General) (Amendment) Regulations (Northern Ireland) 1996 (S.R. 1996 No. 78)
- Social Security (Contributions) (Amendment No. 2) Regulations (Northern Ireland) 1996 (S.R. 1996 No. 79)
- Diseases of Animals (Importation of Bird Products) Order (Northern Ireland) 1996 (S.R. 1996 No. 81)
- Diseases of Animals (Importation of Poultry) (Amendment) Order (Northern Ireland) 1996 (S.R. 1996 No. 82)
- Health and Personal Social Services (Assessment of Resources) (Amendment) Regulations (Northern Ireland) 1996 (S.R. 1996 No. 83)
- Housing Benefit (General) (Amendment) Regulations (Northern Ireland) 1996 (S.R. 1996 No. 84)
- Social Security (Claims and Payments Etc.) (Amendment) Regulations (Northern Ireland) 1996 (S.R. 1996 No. 85)
- Judicial Pensions (Additional Voluntary Contributions) (No. 2) (Amendment) Regulations (Northern Ireland) 1996 (S.R. 1996 No. 86)
- Department of the Environment (Fees) Order (Northern Ireland) 1996 (S.R. 1996 No. 87)
- Social Security (Contributions) (Amendment No. 3) Regulations (Northern Ireland) 1996 (S.R. 1996 No. 89)
- Pensions Increase (Review) Order (Northern Ireland) 1996 (S.R. 1996 No. 90)
- Pensions (1995 Order) (Commencement No. 2) Order (Northern Ireland) 1996 (S.R. 1996 No. 91)
- Income-Related Benefits (Amendment) Regulations (Northern Ireland) 1996 (S.R. 1996 No. 92)
- Income-Related Benefits (Miscellaneous Amendments) Regulations (Northern Ireland) 1996 (S.R. 1996 No. 93)
- Occupational Pension Schemes (Discharge of Protected Rights on Winding Up) Regulations (Northern Ireland) 1996 (S.R. 1996 No. 94)
- Personal and Occupational Pension Schemes (Miscellaneous Amendments) Regulations (Northern Ireland) 1996 (S.R. 1996 No. 95)
- Legal Advice and Assistance (Financial Conditions) Regulations (Northern Ireland) 1996 (S.R. 1996 No. 96)
- Legal Aid (Financial Conditions) Regulations (Northern Ireland) 1996 (S.R. 1996 No. 97)
- Legal Advice and Assistance (Amendment) Regulations (Northern Ireland) 1996 (S.R. 1996 No. 98)
- Child Support Commissioners (Procedure) (Amendment) Regulations (Northern Ireland) 1996 (S.R. 1996 No. 99)
- Supreme Court Fees Order (Northern Ireland) 1996 (S.R. 1996 No. 100)

== 101-200 ==
- Judgment Enforcement Fees Order (Northern Ireland) 1996 (S.R. 1996 No. 101)
- Magistrates' Courts Fees Order (Northern Ireland) 1996 (S.R. 1996 No. 102)
- County Court Fees Order (Northern Ireland) 1996 (S.R. 1996 No. 103)
- Supreme Court (Non-Contentious Probate) Fees Order (Northern Ireland) 1996 (S.R. 1996 No. 104)
- Matrimonial Causes Fees Order (Northern Ireland) 1996 (S.R. 1996 No. 105)
- Dental Charges (Amendment) Regulations (Northern Ireland) 1996 (S.R. 1996 No. 106)
- Travelling Expenses and Remission of Charges (Amendment) Regulations (Northern Ireland) 1996 (S.R. 1996 No. 107)
- Social Security (Contributions), Statutory Maternity Pay and Statutory Sick Pay (Miscellaneous Amendments) Regulations (Northern Ireland) 1996 (S.R. 1996 No. 108)
- Health and Safety (Medical Devices) Regulations (Northern Ireland) 1996 (S.R. 1996 No. 109)
- Housing Renovation etc. Grants (Reduction of Grant) (Amendment) Regulations (Northern Ireland) 1996 (S.R. 1996 No. 110)
- Housing Benefit (General) (Amendment No. 2) Regulations (Northern Ireland) 1996 (S.R. 1996 No. 111)
- Charges for Drugs and Appliances (Amendment) Regulations (Northern Ireland) 1996 (S.R. 1996 No. 112)
- Motor Hackney Carriages (Belfast) (Amendment) By-Laws (Northern Ireland) 1996 (S.R. 1996 No. 113)
- General Dental Services (Amendment) Regulation z (Northern Ireland) 1996 (S.R. 1996 No. 114)
- Housing Benefit (General and Supply of Information) (Amendment) Regulations (Northern Ireland) 1996 (S.R. 1996 No. 115)
- Sperrin Lakeland Health and Social Services Trust (Establishment) Order (Northern Ireland) 1996 (S.R. 1996 No. 116)
- Foyle Health and Social Services Trust (Establishment) (Amendment) Order (Northern Ireland) 1996 (S.R. 1996 No. 117)
- Roads (Speed Limit) (No. 4) Order (Northern Ireland) 1996 (S.R. 1996 No. 118)
- Health and Safety (Safety Signs and Signals) Regulations (Northern Ireland) 1996 (S.R. 1996 No. 119)
- Income Support (General) (Amendment No. 2) Regulations (Northern Ireland) 1996 (S.R. 1996 No. 120)
- Children's Evidence (1995 Order) (Commencement) Order (Northern Ireland) 1996 (S.R. 1996 No. 122)
- Health and Personal Social Services (Amendment) (1995 Order) (Commencement No. 2) Order (Northern Ireland) 1996 (S.R. 1996 No. 123)
- Optical Charges and Payments (Amendment) Regulations (Northern Ireland) 1996 (S.R. 1996 No. 124)
- Health and Social Services Trusts (Originating Capital Debt) Order (Northern Ireland) 1996 (S.R. 1996 No. 125)
- Magistrates' Courts (Amendment) Rules (Northern Ireland) 1996 (S.R. 1996 No. 126)
- Magistrates' Courts (Children's Evidence) (Notices of Transfer) Rules (Northern Ireland) 1996 (S.R. 1996 No. 127)
- Guardians Ad Litem (Panel) Regulation (Northern Ireland) 1996 (S.R. 1996 No. 128)
- Health and Personal Social Services (Fund-holding Practices) Amendment Regulations (Northern Ireland) 1996 (S.R. 1996 No. 131)
- Beef (Emergency Control) Order (Northern Ireland) 1996 (S.R. 1996 No. 132)
- Specified Bovine Material Order (Northern Ireland) 1996 (S.R. 1996 No. 133)
- Specified Bovine Material (Treatment and Disposal) Regulations (Northern Ireland) 1996 (S.R. 1996 No. 134)
- General Ophthalmic Services (Amendment) Regulations (Northern Ireland) 1996 (S.R. 1996 No. 135)
- General Medical and Pharmaceutical Services (Amendment) Regulations (Northern Ireland) 1996 (S.R. 1996 No. 136)
- Health and Personal Social Services (Disciplinary Procedures) Regulations (Northern Ireland) 1996 (S.R. 1996 No. 137)
- Goods Vehicles (Testing) (Amendment) Regulations (Northern Ireland) 1996 (S.R. 1996 No. 139)
- Motor Vehicle Testing (Amendment) Regulations (Northern Ireland) 1996 (S.R. 1996 No. 140)
- Motor Vehicles (Driving Licences) (Amendment) (Test Fees) Regulations (Northern Ireland) 1996 (S.R. 1996 No. 141)
- Motor Vehicles (Taxi Drivers' Licences) (Fees) (Amendment) Regulations (Northern Ireland) 1996 (S.R. 1996 No. 142)
- Public Service Vehicles (Licence Fees) (Amendment) Regulations (Northern Ireland) 1996 (S.R. 1996 No. 143)
- International Transport of Goods under Cover of TIR Carnets (Fees) (Amendment) Regulations (Northern Ireland) 1996 (S.R. 1996 No. 144)
- Passenger and Goods Vehicles (Recording Equipment) Regulations (Northern Ireland) 1996 (S.R. 1996 No. 145)
- Motor Vehicles (Payments in Respect of Applicants for Exemption from Wearing Seat Belts) Order (Northern Ireland) 1996 (S.R. 1996 No. 146)
- Repairs Grants (Eligible Expense) Order (Northern Ireland) 1996 (S.R. 1996 No. 147)
- Housing Renovation etc. Grants (Grant Limit) Order (Northern Ireland) 1996 (S.R. 1996 No. 148)
- Social Security (Reduced Rates of Class 1 Contributions) (Salary Related Contracted-out Schemes) Order (Northern Ireland) 1996 (S.R. 1996 No. 149)
- Social Security (Reduced Rates of Class 1 Contributions and Rebates) (Money Purchase Contracted-out Schemes) Order (Northern Ireland) 1996 (S.R. 1996 No. 150)
- Social Security (Minimum Contributions to Appropriate Personal Pension Schemes) Order (Northern Ireland) 1996 (S.R. 1996 No. 151)
- Social Security (Contributions) (Amendment No. 4) Regulations (Northern Ireland) 1996 (S.R. 1996 No. 152)
- Children's Evidence (Northern Ireland) Order 1995 (Notice of Transfer) Regulations 1996 (S.R. 1996 No. 153)
- Motor Vehicles (Type Approval) (Amendment) Regulations (Northern Ireland) 1996 (S.R. 1996 No. 156)
- Land Registry (Fees) Order (Northern Ireland) 1996 (S.R. 1996 No. 157)
- Health and Safety (Miscellaneous Fees Amendment) Regulations (Northern Ireland) 1996 (S.R. 1996 No. 159)
- Health and Social Services Trusts (Originating Capital Debt) (Amendment) Order (Northern Ireland) 1996 (S.R. 1996 No. 160)
- One-Way Traffic (Omagh) (Amendment) Order (Northern Ireland) 1996 (S.R. 1996 No. 161)
- Roads (Speed Limit) (No. 5) Order (Northern Ireland) 1996 (S.R. 1996 No. 162)
- One-Way Traffic (Killyleagh) Order (Northern Ireland) 1996 (S.R. 1996 No. 163)
- Plastic Materials and Articles in Contact with Food (Amendment) Regulations (Northern Ireland) 1996 (S.R. 1996 No. 164)
- Fertilisers (Mammalian Meat and Bone Meal) Regulations (Northern Ireland) 1996 (S.R. 1996 No. 165)
- Social Security Revaluation of Earnings Factors Order (Northern Ireland) 1996 (S.R. 1996 No. 168)
- Urban Clearways (Belfast) (No. 2) Order (Amendment) Order (Northern Ireland) 1996 (S.R. 1996 No. 170)
- Traffic Weight Restriction (Rosscor Viaduct Bridge) Order (Northern Ireland) 1996 (S.R. 1996 No. 171)
- Community Work Programme (Miscellaneous Provisions) Order (Northern Ireland) 1996 (S.R. 1996 No. 172)
- Industrial Tribunals (Constitution and Rules of Procedure) Regulations (Northern Ireland) 1996 (S.R. 1996 No. 173)
- Beef (Emergency Control) (Amendment) Order (Northern Ireland) 1996 (S.R. 1996 No. 175)
- Weights and Measures (Guernsey and Alderney) Order (Northern Ireland) 1996 (S.R. 1996 No. 177)
- Temporary Speed Limit (Sydenham By-Pass, Route A2, Belfast) Order (Northern Ireland) 1996 (S.R. 1996 No. 178)
- Companies (Summary Financial Statement) Regulations (Northern Ireland) 1996 (S.R. 1996 No. 179)
- Jobseekers (1995 Order) (Commencement No. 2) Order (Northern Ireland) 1996 (S.R. 1996 No. 180)
- Housing Benefit (General) (Amendment No. 3) Regulations (Northern Ireland) 1996 (S.R. 1996 No. 181)
- Bovine Animals (Enforcement of Community Purchase Scheme) Regulations (Northern Ireland) 1996 (S.R. 1996 No. 182)
- Slaughter-houses (Licensing) (Amendment) Regulations (Northern Ireland) 1996 (S.R. 1996 No. 183)
- Social Security Benefits Up-rating (No. 2) Order (Northern Ireland) 1996 (S.R. 1996 No. 184)
- Specified Bovine Material (Amendment) Order (Northern Ireland) 1996 (S.R. 1996 No. 185)
- Specified Bovine Material (Treatment and Disposal) (Amendment) Regulations (Northern Ireland) 1996 (S.R. 1996 No. 186)
- Pharmaceutical Society of Northern Ireland (General) (Amendment) Regulations (Northern Ireland) 1996 (S.R. 1996 No. 187)
- Social Security (Additional Pension) (Contributions Paid in Error) Regulations (Northern Ireland) 1996 (S.R. 1996 No. 188)
- Local Government (General Grant) Order (Northern Ireland) 1996 (S.R. 1996 No. 189)
- Students Awards Regulations (Northern Ireland) 1996 (S.R. 1996 No. 190)
- Agricultural Processing and Marketing Grant Regulations (Northern Ireland) 1996 (S.R. 1996 No. 196)
- Motor Vehicles (Driving Licences) (Amendment No. 2) Regulations (Northern Ireland) 1996 (S.R. 1996 No. 197)
- Jobseeker's Allowance Regulations (Northern Ireland) 1996 (S.R. 1996 No. 198)
- Income Support (General) (Jobseeker's Allowance Consequential Amendments) Regulations (Northern Ireland) 1996 (S.R. 1996 No. 199)
- Jobseeker's Allowance (Transitional Provisions) Regulations (Northern Ireland) 1996 (S.R. 1996 No. 200)

== 201-300 ==
- Social Security (Back to Work Bonus) Regulations (Northern Ireland) 1996 (S.R. 1996 No. 201)
- Social Security Benefits (Maintenance Payments and Consequential Amendments) Regulations (Northern Ireland) 1996 (S.R. 1996 No. 202)
- Occupational Pension Schemes (Internal Dispute Resolution Procedures) Regulations (Northern Ireland) 1996 (S.R. 1996 No. 203)
- Plant Health (Amendment) Order (Northern Ireland) 1996 (S.R. 1996 No. 204)
- Legal Advice and Assistance (Prospective Cost) Regulations (Northern Ireland) 1996 (S.R. 1996 No. 205)
- Statutory Maternity Pay (General) (Amendment) Regulations (Northern Ireland) 1996 (S.R. 1996 No. 206)
- Personal and Occupational Pension Schemes (Pensions Ombudsman) (Amendment) Regulations (Northern Ireland) 1996 (S.R. 1996 No. 207)
- Horse Racing (Charges on Bookmakers) Order (Northern Ireland) 1996 (S.R. 1996 No. 208)
- Travelling Expenses and Remission of Charges (Amendment No. 2) Regulations (Northern Ireland) 1996 (S.R. 1996 No. 209)
- Compulsory Acquisition (Interest) Order (Northern Ireland) 1996 (S.R. 1996 No. 210)
- Interest on Recoverable Sanitation Expenses Order (Northern Ireland) 1996 (S.R. 1996 No. 211)
- Rules of the Supreme Court (Northern Ireland) (Amendment) 1996 (S.R. 1996 No. 212)
- Countryside Access Regulations (Northern Ireland) 1996 (S.R. 1996 No. 213)
- Certification Officer (Fees) (Amendment) Regulations (Northern Ireland) 1996 (S.R. 1996 No. 214)
- Roads (Speed Limit) (No. 6) Order (Northern Ireland) 1996 (S.R. 1996 No. 215)
- Gas (1996 Order) (Commencement) Order (Northern Ireland) 1996 (S.R. 1996 No. 216)
- Protection of Water Against Agricultural Nitrate Pollution Regulations (Northern Ireland) 1996 (S.R. 1996 No. 217)
- Income Support (General) (Standard Interest Rate Amendment) Regulations (Northern Ireland) 1996 (S.R. 1996 No. 218)
- Disability Discrimination Act 1995 (Commencement No. 2) Order (Northern Ireland) 1996 (S.R. 1996 No. 219)
- Sperrin Lakeland Health and Social Services Trust (Establishment) (Amendment) Order (Northern Ireland) 1996 (S.R. 1996 No. 220)
- Housing Benefit (General) (Amendment No. 4) Regulations (Northern Ireland) 1996 (S.R. 1996 No. 221)
- Legal Aid in Criminal Proceedings (Costs) (Amendment) Rules (Northern Ireland) 1996 (S.R. 1996 No. 222)
- Street Works (1995 Order) (Commencement No. 1) Order (Northern Ireland) 1996 (S.R. 1996 No. 223)
- Family Credit (General) (Amendment) Regulations (Northern Ireland) 1996 (S.R. 1996 No. 224)
- Social Security (Disability Living Allowance, Attendance Allowance and Claims and Payments) (Amendment) Regulations (Northern Ireland) 1996 (S.R. 1996 No. 225)
- Offshore Installations and Wells (Design and Construction, etc.) Regulations (Northern Ireland) 1996 (S.R. 1996 No. 228)
- Suckler Cow Premium (Amendment) Regulations (Northern Ireland) 1996 (S.R. 1996 No. 229)
- Hill Livestock (Compensatory Allowances) Regulations (Northern Ireland) 1996 (S.R. 1996 No. 230)
- Game Birds Preservation Order (Northern Ireland) 1996 (S.R. 1996 No. 231)
- Planning (General Development) (Amendment) Order (Northern Ireland) 1996 (S.R. 1996 No. 232)
- On-Street Parking (Amendment) Bye-Laws (Northern Ireland) 1996 (S.R. 1996 No. 233)
- Off-Street Parking Bye-Laws (Northern Ireland) 1996 (S.R. 1996 No. 237)
- Diseases of Animals (Modification) Order (Northern Ireland) 1996 (S.R. 1996 No. 238)
- Brucellosis Control (Amendment) Order (Northern Ireland) 1996 (S.R. 1996 No. 239)
- Tuberculosis Control (Amendment) Order (Northern Ireland) 1996 (S.R. 1996 No. 240)
- Parking Places on Roads (Amendment) Order (Northern Ireland) 1996 (S.R. 1996 No. 241)
- Seed Potatoes (Amendment) Regulations (Northern Ireland) 1996 (S.R. 1996 No. 242)
- Disclosure of Interests in Shares (Amendment) Regulations (Northern Ireland) 1996 (S.R. 1996 No. 246)
- Equipment and Protective Systems Intended for Use in Potentially Explosive Atmospheres Regulations (Northern Ireland) 1996 (S.R. 1996 No. 247)
- Planning (Use Classes) (Amendment) Order (Northern Ireland) 1996 (S.R. 1996 No. 248)
- Plant Health (Amendment No. 2) Order (Northern Ireland) 1996 (S.R. 1996 No. 249)
- Genetically Modified Organisms (Contained Use) (Amendment) Regulations (Northern Ireland) 1996 (S.R. 1996 No. 250)
- Offshore, and Pipelines, Safety (1992 Order) (Commencement No. 2) Order (Northern Ireland) 1996 (S.R. 1996 No. 251)
- Financial Markets and Insolvency Regulations (Northern Ireland) 1996 (S.R. 1996 No. 252)
- Royal Ulster Constabulary (Discipline and Disciplinary Appeals) (Amendment) Regulations 1996 (S.R. 1996 No. 253)
- Royal Ulster Constabulary Reserve (Part-time) (Discipline and Disciplinary Appeals) (Amendment) Regulations 1996 (S.R. 1996 No. 254)
- Arable Area Payments (Grazing of Bovine Animals on Set-Aside Land) (Temporary Provisions) Regulations (Northern Ireland) 1996 (S.R. 1996 No. 258)
- Feeding Stuffs (Amendment) Regulations (Northern Ireland) 1996 (S.R. 1996 No. 259)
- Teachers' Superannuation (Additional Voluntary Contributions) Regulations (Northern Ireland) 1996 (S.R. 1996 No. 260)
- Police and Criminal Evidence (Northern Ireland) Order 1989 (Codes of Practice) (No. 2) Order 1996 (S.R. 1996 No. 261)
- Marking of Plastic Explosive for Detection Regulations (Northern Ireland) 1996 (S.R. 1996 No. 262)
- Food Safety (Fishery Products and Live Bivalve Molluscs and Other Shellfish) (Miscellaneous Amendments) Regulations (Northern Ireland) 1996 (S.R. 1996 No. 264)
- Registration of Deeds (Fees) Order (Northern Ireland) 1996 (S.R. 1996 No. 265)
- Juries (1996 Order) (Commencement) Order (Northern Ireland) 1996 (S.R. 1996 No. 267)
- Form of Jurors Oath Order (Northern Ireland) 1996 (S.R. 1996 No. 268)
- Juries Regulations (Northern Ireland) 1996 (S.R. 1996 No. 269)
- Northern Ireland Disability Council (No. 2) Regulations (Northern Ireland) 1996 (S.R. 1996 No. 272)
- Diseases of Animals (Modification No. 2) Order (Northern Ireland) 1996 (S.R. 1996 No. 273)
- Equine Viral Arteritis Order (Northern Ireland) 1996 (S.R. 1996 No. 274)
- Motor Vehicles (Construction and Use) (Amendment) Regulations (Northern Ireland) 1996 (S.R. 1996 No. 275)
- Industrial Training Levy (Construction Industry) Order (Northern Ireland) 1996 (S.R. 1996 No. 276)
- Disability Discrimination Act 1995 (Commencement No. 3 and Saving and Transitional Provisions) Order (Northern Ireland) 1996 (S.R. 1996 No. 280)
- Crown Court (Amendment No. 2) Rules (Northern Ireland) 1996 (S.R. 1996 No. 281)
- Rules of the Supreme Court (Northern Ireland) (Amendment No. 2) 1996 (S.R. 1996 No. 282)
- Rules of the Supreme Court (Northern Ireland) (Amendment No. 3) 1996 (S.R. 1996 No. 283)
- Pensions (1995 Order) (Commencement No. 3) Order (Northern Ireland) 1996 (S.R. 1996 No. 284)
- Jobseekers (1995 Order) (Commencement No. 3) Order (Northern Ireland) 1996 (S.R. 1996 No. 285)
- Food Safety (General Food Hygiene) (Amendment) Regulations (Northern Ireland) 1996 (S.R. 1996 No. 286)
- Dairy Products (Hygiene) (Amendment) Regulations (Northern Ireland) 1996 (S.R. 1996 No. 287)
- Child Benefit, Child Support and Social Security (Miscellaneous Amendments) Regulations (Northern Ireland) 1996 (S.R. 1996 No. 288)
- Social Security and Child Support (Jobseeker's Allowance) (Consequential Amendments) Regulations (Northern Ireland) 1996 (S.R. 1996 No. 289)
- Social Security (Disability Living Allowance) (Amendment) Regulations (Northern Ireland) 1996 (S.R. 1996 No. 290)
- Income-Related Benefits (Miscellaneous Amendments No. 2) Regulations (Northern Ireland) 1996 (S.R. 1996 No. 291)
- Police and Criminal Evidence (Application to Customs and Excise) (Amendment) Order (Northern Ireland) 1996 (S.R. 1996 No. 292)
- County Courts (Amendment) (1996 Order) (Commencement) Order (Northern Ireland) 1996 (S.R. 1996 No. 293)
- County Court (Amendment No. 2) Rules (Northern Ireland) 1996 (S.R. 1996 No. 294)
- County Court (Amendment No. 3) Rules (Northern Ireland) 1996 (S.R. 1996 No. 295)
- Divorce etc. (Pensions) Regulations (Northern Ireland) 1996 (S.R. 1996 No. 296)
- Children (1995 Order) (Commencement No. 3) Order (Northern Ireland) 1996 (S.R. 1996 No. 297)
- Students Awards (No. 2) Regulations (Northern Ireland) 1996 (S.R. 1996 No. 298)
- Motor Vehicles (Driving Licences) (Fees) (Amendment) Regulations (Northern Ireland) 1996 (S.R. 1996 No. 299)
- Children (Allocation of Proceedings) Order (Northern Ireland) 1996 (S.R. 1996 No. 300)

== 301-400 ==
- Children (Admissibility of Hearsay Evidence) Order (Northern Ireland) 1996 (S.R. 1996 No. 301)
- Juvenile Courts and Assessors for County Courts (Amendment) Regulations (Northern Ireland) 1996 (S.R. 1996 No. 302)
- Motor Vehicles (Taxi Drivers' Licences) (Amendment) Regulations (Northern Ireland) 1996 (S.R. 1996 No. 304)
- Motor Vehicles (Driving Licences) (Large Goods and Passenger-Carrying Vehicles) (Fees) (Amendment) Regulations (Northern Ireland) 1996 (S.R. 1996 No. 305)
- Pensions (1995 Order) (Commencement No. 4) Order (Northern Ireland) 1996 (S.R. 1996 No. 307)
- Parking Places on Roads (Amendment No. 2) Order (Northern Ireland) 1996 (S.R. 1996 No. 309)
- Control of Traffic (Antrim) Order (Northern Ireland) 1996 (S.R. 1996 No. 310)
- Fodder Plant Seeds (Amendment) Regulations (Northern Ireland) 1996 (S.R. 1996 No. 311)
- Oil and Fibre Plant Seeds (Amendment) Regulations (Northern Ireland) 1996 (S.R. 1996 No. 312)
- Vegetable Seeds (Amendment) Regulations (Northern Ireland) 1996 (S.R. 1996 No. 313)
- Police (Amendment) (1995 Order) (Commencement No. 1) Order (Northern Ireland) 1996 (S.R. 1996 No. 316)
- Child Support (Miscellaneous Amendments) Regulations (Northern Ireland) 1996 (S.R. 1996 No. 317)
- Income Support (General) (Standard Interest Rate Amendment No. 2) Regulations (Northern Ireland) 1996 (S.R. 1996 No. 318)
- Social Security (Back to Work Bonus) (Amendment) Regulations (Northern Ireland) 1996 (S.R. 1996 No. 319)
- Non-automatic Weighing Machines and Non-automatic Weighing Instruments (Amendment) Regulations (Northern Ireland) 1996 (S.R. 1996 No. 320)
- Rules of the Supreme Court (Northern Ireland) (Amendment No. 4) 1996 (S.R. 1996 No. 321)
- Family Proceedings Rules (Northern Ireland) 1996 (S.R. 1996 No. 322)
- Magistrates' Courts (Children (Northern Ireland) Order 1995) Rules (Northern Ireland) 1996 (S.R. 1996 No. 323)
- Magistrates' Courts (Domestic Proceedings) Rules (Northern Ireland) 1996 (S.R. 1996 No. 324)
- Magistrates' Courts (Children and Young Persons) (Amendment) Rules (Northern Ireland) 1996 (S.R. 1996 No. 325)
- Social Security (Reciprocal Agreements) Order (Northern Ireland) 1996 (S.R. 1996 No. 327)
- Education Reform (Amendment) Order (Northern Ireland) 1996 (S.R. 1996 No. 328)
- Education (1996 Order) (Commencement No. 1) Order (Northern Ireland) 1996 (S.R. 1996 No. 329)
- Curriculum (Programmes of Study and Attainment Target in Home Economics at Key Stages 3 and 4) Order (Northern Ireland) 1996 (S.R. 1996 No. 330)
- Curriculum (Programmes of Study and Attainment Targets in Physical Education at Key Stages 3 and 4) Order (Northern Ireland) 1996 (S.R. 1996 No. 331)
- Curriculum (Programme of Study in Business Studies at Key Stage 4) Order (Northern Ireland) 1996 (S.R. 1996 No. 332)
- Curriculum (Programmes of Study in Economics, Political Studies and Social and Environmental Studies at Key Stage 4) Order (Northern Ireland) 1996 (S.R. 1996 No. 333)
- Housing Benefit (General and Supply of Information) (Jobseeker's Allowance) (Consequential Amendments) Regulations (Northern Ireland) 1996 (S.R. 1996 No. 334)
- Curriculum (Programmes of Study and Attainment Targets in Science at Key Stages 3 and 4) Order (Northern Ireland) 1996 (S.R. 1996 No. 335)
- Curriculum (Programme of Study in Drama at Key Stage 4) Order (Northern Ireland) 1996 (S.R. 1996 No. 336)
- Curriculum (Programmes of Study and Attainment Target in Art and Design at Key Stages 3 and 4) Order (Northern Ireland) 1996 (S.R. 1996 No. 337)
- Curriculum (Programmes of Study and Attainment Target in Technology and Design at Key Stages 3 and 4) Order (Northern Ireland) 1996 (S.R. 1996 No. 338)
- Curriculum (Programmes of Study and Attainment Target in Music at Key Stages 3 and 4) Order (Northern Ireland) 1996 (S.R. 1996 No. 339)
- Curriculum (Programme of Study and Attainment Targets in English at Key Stages 3 and 4) Order (Northern Ireland) 1996 (S.R. 1996 No. 340)
- Curriculum (Programme of Study and Attainment Targets in Mathematics at Key Stages 3 and 4) Order (Northern Ireland) 1996 (S.R. 1996 No. 341)
- Curriculum (Programme of Study and Attainment Targets in Modern Languages at Key Stages 3 and 4) Order (Northern Ireland) 1996 (S.R. 1996 No. 342)
- Royal Ulster Constabulary (Discipline and Disciplinary Appeals) (Amendment No. 2) Regulations 1996 (S.R. 1996 No. 343)
- Royal Ulster Constabulary Reserve (Part-time) (Discipline and Disciplinary Appeals) (Amendment No. 2) Regulations 1996 (S.R. 1996 No. 344)
- Social Security (Malta) Order (Northern Ireland) 1996 (S.R. 1996 No. 345)
- Curriculum (Programmes of Study and Attainment Targets at Key Stages 1 and 2) Order (Northern Ireland) 1996 (S.R. 1996 No. 346)
- Curriculum (Programmes of Study and Attainment Target in History at Key Stages 3 and 4) Order (Northern Ireland) 1996 (S.R. 1996 No. 347)
- Curriculum (Programmes of Study and Attainment Target in Geography at Key Stages 3 and 4) Order (Northern Ireland) 1996 (S.R. 1996 No. 348)
- Education (Student Loans) Regulations (Northern Ireland) 1996 (S.R. 1996 No. 349)
- Curriculum (English in Irish Speaking Schools) (Exceptions) Regulations (Northern Ireland) 1996 (S.R. 1996 No. 350)
- Curriculum (Core Syllabus for Religious Education) Order (Northern Ireland) 1996 (S.R. 1996 No. 351)
- Taxis (Strabane) (Amendment) Bye-Laws (Northern Ireland) 1996 (S.R. 1996 No. 352)
- Misuse of Drugs (Amendment) Regulations (Northern Ireland) 1996 (S.R. 1996 No. 353)
- Social Security (Claims and Payments) (Jobseeker's Allowance Consequential Amendments) Regulations (Northern Ireland) 1996 (S.R. 1996 No. 354)
- Social Security (Adjudication) (Amendment) Regulations (Northern Ireland) 1996 (S.R. 1996 No. 355)
- Jobseeker's Allowance (Amendment) Regulations (Northern Ireland) 1996 (S.R. 1996 No. 356)
- Jobseeker's Allowance (Transitional Provisions) (Amendment) Regulations (Northern Ireland) 1996 (S.R. 1996 No. 357)
- Social Security and Child Support (Jobseeker's Allowance) (Amendment) Regulations (Northern Ireland) 1996 (S.R. 1996 No. 358)
- Education (School Information and Prospectuses) (Amendment) Regulations (Northern Ireland) 1996 (S.R. 1996 No. 359)
- Specified Bovine Material (No. 2) Order (Northern Ireland) 1996 (S.R. 1996 No. 360)
- Specified Bovine Material (Treatment and Disposal) (No. 2) Regulations (Northern Ireland) 1996 (S.R. 1996 No. 361)
- Bovine Spongiform Encephalopathy (Amendment) Order (Northern Ireland) 1996 (S.R. 1996 No. 362)
- Education (Assessment Arrangements for Key Stages 1 and 2) Order (Northern Ireland) 1996 (S.R. 1996 No. 363)
- Education (Assessment Arrangements for Key Stage 3) Order (Northern Ireland) 1996 (S.R. 1996 No. 364)
- Temporary Speed Limit (Sydenham By-Pass, Route A2, Belfast) (No. 2) Order (Northern Ireland) 1996 (S.R. 1996 No. 367)
- Control of Traffic (Omagh) Order (Northern Ireland) 1996 (S.R. 1996 No. 368)
- Harbour Works (Assessment of Environmental Effects) (Amendment) Regulations (Northern Ireland) 1996 (S.R. 1996 No. 369)
- One-Way Traffic (Ballymena) (Amendment No. 3) Order (Northern Ireland) 1996 (S.R. 1996 No. 372)
- One-Way Traffic (Ballymena) (Amendment No. 4) Order (Northern Ireland) 1996 (S.R. 1996 No. 373)
- Traffic Weight Restriction (Long Rig Road, Nutts Corner, Crumlin) Order (Northern Ireland) 1996 (S.R. 1996 No. 374)
- Income-Related Benefits (Montserrat) Regulations (Northern Ireland) 1996 (S.R. 1996 No. 375)
- Chemicals (Hazard Information and Packaging for Supply) (Amendment) Regulations (Northern Ireland) 1996 (S.R. 1996 No. 376)
- Lands Tribunal (Salaries) Order (Northern Ireland) 1996 (S.R. 1996 No. 377)
- General Dental Services (Amendment No. 2) Regulations (Northern Ireland) 1996 (S.R. 1996 No. 382)
- Food Labelling Regulations (Northern Ireland) 1996 (S.R. 1996 No. 383)
- Food (Lot Marking) Regulations (Northern Ireland) 1996 (S.R. 1996 No. 384)
- Bread and Flour (Amendment) Regulations (Northern Ireland) 1996 (S.R. 1996 No. 385)
- Repairs Grants (Appropriate Percentage) Order (Northern Ireland) 1996 (S.R. 1996 No. 387)
- Bovine Embryo Collection, Production and Transplantation Regulations (Northern Ireland) 1996 (S.R. 1996 No. 389)
- Specified Bovine Material (Treatment and Disposal) (No. 3) Regulations (Northern Ireland) 1996 (S.R. 1996 No. 390)
- Explosives (Fireworks) Regulations (Northern Ireland) 1996 (S.R. 1996 No. 391)
- Traffic Signs (Amendment No. 2) Regulations (Northern Ireland) 1996 (S.R. 1996 No. 392)
- Pharmaceutical Qualifications (Recognition) Regulations (Northern Ireland) 1996 (S.R. 1996 No. 393)
- Specified Diseases (Notification and Movement Restrictions) (Amendment) Order (Northern Ireland) 1996 (S.R. 1996 No. 398)
- Diseases of Animals (Modification) (No. 3) Order (Northern Ireland) 1996 (S.R. 1996 No. 399)
- Johne's Disease (Revocation) Order (Northern Ireland) 1996 (S.R. 1996 No. 400)

== 401-500 ==
- Jobseekers (1995 Order) (Commencement No. 4) Order (Northern Ireland) 1996 (S.R. 1996 No. 401)
- Beef (Emergency Control) (Revocation) Order (Northern Ireland) 1996 (S.R. 1996 No. 403)
- Fresh Meat (Beef Controls) Regulations (Northern Ireland) 1996 (S.R. 1996 No. 404)
- Income-Related Benefits and Social Fund (Miscellaneous Amendments) Regulations (Northern Ireland) 1996 (S.R. 1996 No. 405)
- Temporary Speed Limit (Magheramason) Order (Northern Ireland) 1996 (S.R. 1996 No. 406)
- Electricity (Non-Fossil Fuel Sources) Order (Northern Ireland) 1996 (S.R. 1996 No. 407)
- Traffic Signs (Amendment No. 3) Regulations (Northern Ireland) 1996 (S.R. 1996 No. 408)
- Seeds (Fees) Regulations (Northern Ireland) 1996 (S.R. 1996 No. 409)
- Legal Aid (Assessment of Resources) (Amendment) Regulations (Northern Ireland) 1996 (S.R. 1996 No. 410)
- Legal Advice and Assistance (Amendment No. 2) Regulations (Northern Ireland) 1996 (S.R. 1996 No. 411)
- General Ophthalmic Services (Amendment No. 2) Regulations (Northern Ireland) 1996 (S.R. 1996 No. 416)
- Domestic Energy Efficiency Grants (Amendment) Regulations (Northern Ireland) 1996 (S.R. 1996 No. 417)
- Sex Discrimination (Amendment) Regulations (Northern Ireland) 1996 (S.R. 1996 No. 418)
- Disability Discrimination (Employment) Regulations (Northern Ireland) 1996 (S.R. 1996 No. 419)
- Disability Discrimination (Sub-leases and Sub-tenancies) Regulations (Northern Ireland) 1996 (S.R. 1996 No. 420)
- Disability Discrimination (Meaning of Disability) Regulations (Northern Ireland) 1996 (S.R. 1996 No. 421)
- Child Benefit (General) (Amendment) Regulations (Northern Ireland) 1996 (S.R. 1996 No. 422)
- Social Fund (Maternity and Funeral Expenses) (General) (Amendment) Regulations (Northern Ireland) 1996 (S.R. 1996 No. 423)
- Optical Charges and Payments (Amendment No. 2) Regulations (Northern Ireland) 1996 (S.R. 1996 No. 424)
- Travelling Expenses and Remission of Charges (Amendment No. 3) Regulations (Northern Ireland) 1996 (S.R. 1996 No. 425)
- Driving Licences (Community Driving Licence) Regulations (Northern Ireland) 1996 (S.R. 1996 No. 426)
- Heads of Sheep and Goats Order (Northern Ireland) 1996 (S.R. 1996 No. 427)
- Heads of Sheep and Goats (Treatment and Disposal) Regulations (Northern Ireland) 1996 (S.R. 1996 No. 428)
- Explosives (Amendment) Regulations (Northern Ireland) 1996 (S.R. 1996 No. 429)
- Social Security (Credits and Contributions) (Jobseeker's Allowance Consequential and Miscellaneous Amendments) Regulations (Northern Ireland) 1996 (S.R. 1996 No. 430)
- Occupational Pension Schemes (Member-nominated Trustees and Directors) Regulations (Northern Ireland) 1996 (S.R. 1996 No. 431)
- Social Security (Claims and Payments and Adjudication) (Amendment) Regulations (Northern Ireland) 1996 (S.R. 1996 No. 432)
- Social Security (Contributions) (Amendment No. 5) Regulations (Northern Ireland) 1996 (S.R. 1996 No. 433)
- Definition of Independent Visitors (Children) Regulations (Northern Ireland) 1996 (S.R. 1996 No. 434)
- Emergency Protection Order (Transfer of Responsibilities) Regulations (Northern Ireland) 1996 (S.R. 1996 No. 435)
- Adoption Allowance Regulations (Northern Ireland) 1996 (S.R. 1996 No. 438)
- Health and Social Services Trusts (Exercise of Functions) (Amendment) Regulations (Northern Ireland) 1996 (S.R. 1996 No. 439)
- Jobseeker's Allowance and Income Support (Amendment) Regulations (Northern Ireland) 1996 (S.R. 1996 No. 440)
- Social Security and Child Support (Jobseeker's Allowance) (Transitional Provisions) (Amendment) Regulations (Northern Ireland) 1996 (S.R. 1996 No. 441)
- Genetically Modified Organisms (Risk Assessment) (Records and Exemptions) Regulations (Northern Ireland) 1996 (S.R. 1996 No. 442)
- Contact with Children Regulations (Northern Ireland) 1996 (S.R. 1996 No. 443)
- Day Care (Exempt Supervised Activities) Regulations (Northern Ireland) 1996 (S.R. 1996 No. 444)
- Motor Vehicles (Prescribed Restrictions) Regulations (Northern Ireland) 1996 (S.R. 1996 No. 446)
- Gas (Applications for Licences and Extensions) Regulations (Northern Ireland) 1996 (S.R. 1996 No. 447)
- Housing Benefit (General) (Amendment No. 5) Regulations (Northern Ireland) 1996 (S.R. 1996 No. 448)
- Income Support and Social Security (Claims and Payments) (Miscellaneous Amendments) Regulations (Northern Ireland) 1996 (S.R. 1996 No. 449)
- Rural Regeneration and Cross-Border Development Regulations (Northern Ireland) 1996 (S.R. 1996 No. 450)
- Representations Procedure (Children) Regulations (Northern Ireland) 1996 (S.R. 1996 No. 451)
- Children (Private Arrangements for Fostering) Regulations (Northern Ireland) 1996 (S.R. 1996 No. 452)
- Arrangements for Placement of Children (General) Regulations (Northern Ireland) 1996 (S.R. 1996 No. 453)
- Family Law (1993 Orders) (Commencement No. 1) Order (Northern Ireland) 1996 (S.R. 1996 No. 454)
- Plant Protection Products (Amendment) Regulations (Northern Ireland) 1996 (S.R. 1996 No. 456)
- Social Security (Adjudication) and Child Support (Amendment No. 2) Regulations (Northern Ireland) 1996 (S.R. 1996 No. 457)
- Fertilisers (Mammalian Meat and Bone Meal) (Amendment) Regulations (Northern Ireland) 1996 (S.R. 1996 No. 458)
- Employment Protection (Recoupment of Jobseeker's Allowance and Income Support) Regulations (Northern Ireland) 1996 (S.R. 1996 No. 459)
- Export of Animals (Protection) Order (Northern Ireland) 1996 (S.R. 1996 No. 460)
- Review of Children's Cases Regulations (Northern Ireland) 1996 (S.R. 1996 No. 461)
- Motor Vehicles (Construction and Use) (Amendment No. 2) Regulations (Northern Ireland) 1996 (S.R. 1996 No. 462)
- Placement of Children with Parents etc. Regulations (Northern Ireland) 1996 (S.R. 1996 No. 463)
- Social Security (Jobseeker's Allowance and Payments on account) (Miscellaneous Amendments) Regulations (Northern Ireland) 1996 (S.R. 1996 No. 464)
- Equal Pay (Amendment) Regulations (Northern Ireland) 1996 (S.R. 1996 No. 465)
- Industrial Tribunals (Constitution and Rules of Procedure) (Amendment) Regulations (Northern Ireland) 1996 (S.R. 1996 No. 466)
- Foster Placement (Children) Regulations (Northern Ireland) 1996 (S.R. 1996 No. 467)
- Child Minding and Day Care (Applications for Registration) Regulations (Northern Ireland) 1996 (S.R. 1996 No. 468)
- Child Benefit (General) (Amendment No. 2) Regulations (Northern Ireland) 1996 (S.R. 1996 No. 469)
- Child Benefit (General) (Amendment No. 3) Regulations (Northern Ireland) 1996 (S.R. 1996 No. 470)
- Insolvent Companies (Disqualification of Unfit Directors) Proceedings (Amendment) Rules (Northern Ireland) 1996 (S.R. 1996 No. 471)
- Insolvent Partnerships (Amendment) Order (Northern Ireland) 1996 (S.R. 1996 No. 472)
- Royal Ulster Constabulary Regulations 1996 (S.R. 1996 No. 473)
- Roads (Speed Limit) (No. 7) Order (Northern Ireland) 1996 (S.R. 1996 No. 474)
- Employment Rights (1996 Order) (Residuary Commencement No. 1) Order (Northern Ireland) 1996 (S.R. 1996 No. 475)
- Income-Related Benefits and Jobseeker's Allowance (Personal Allowances for Children and Young Persons) (Amendment) Regulations (Northern Ireland) 1996 (S.R. 1996 No. 476)
- Employment of Children Regulations (Northern Ireland) 1996 (S.R. 1996 No. 477)
- Disqualification for Caring for Children Regulations (Northern Ireland) 1996 (S.R. 1996 No. 478)
- Children's Homes Regulations (Northern Ireland) 1996 (S.R. 1996 No. 479)
- Refuges (Children's Homes and Foster Placements) Regulations (Northern Ireland) 1996 (S.R. 1996 No. 480)
- Children (Public Performances) Regulations (Northern Ireland) 1996 (S.R. 1996 No. 481)
- Legal Aid, Advice and Assistance (Amendment) Order (Northern Ireland) 1996 (S.R. 1996 No. 482)
- Legal Advice and Assistance (Amendment No. 3) Regulations (Northern Ireland) 1996 (S.R. 1996 No. 483)
- Optical Charges and Payments (Amendment No. 3) Regulations (Northern Ireland) 1996 (S.R. 1996 No. 484)
- Pneumoconiosis, etc., (Workers' Compensation) (Payment of Claims) (Amendment) Regulations (Northern Ireland) 1996 (S.R. 1996 No. 485)
- Children (Secure Accommodation) Regulations (Northern Ireland) 1996 (S.R. 1996 No. 487)
- Social Fund (Cold Weather Payments) (General) (Amendment) Regulations (Northern Ireland) 1996 (S.R. 1996 No. 488)
- Income Support (General) (Amendment No. 3) Regulations (Northern Ireland) 1996 (S.R. 1996 No. 489)
- Education (Student Loans) (Amendment) Regulations (Northern Ireland) 1996 (S.R. 1996 No. 490)
- Fire Services (Appointments and Promotion) (Amendment) Regulations (Northern Ireland) 1996 (S.R. 1996 No. 491)
- Child Support (1995 Order) (Commencement No. 3) Order (Northern Ireland) 1996 (S.R. 1996 No. 492)
- Occupational Pension Schemes (Contracting-out) Regulations (Northern Ireland) 1996 (S.R. 1996 No. 493)
- Magistrates' Courts Fees (Amendment) Order (Northern Ireland) 1996 (S.R. 1996 No. 494)
- Sheep Annual Premium (Amendment) Regulations (Northern Ireland) 1996 (S.R. 1996 No. 497)
- Hill Livestock (Compensatory Allowances) (Amendment) Regulations (Northern Ireland) 1996 (S.R. 1996 No. 498)
- Social Security (Adjudication) (Amendment No. 2) Regulations (Northern Ireland) 1996 (S.R. 1996 No. 499)
- Registration (Births, Still-Births and Deaths) (Amendment) Regulations (Northern Ireland) 1996 (S.R. 1996 No. 500)

== 501-600 ==
- Marriage of Children (Consents) (Amendment) Regulations (Northern Ireland) 1996 (S.R. 1996 No. 501)
- Pig Production Development (Levy) Order (Northern Ireland) 1996 (S.R. 1996 No. 502)
- Social Security and Child Support (Jobseeker's Allowance) (Miscellaneous Amendments) Regulations (Northern Ireland) 1996 (S.R. 1996 No. 503)
- Fair Employment (Specification of Public Authorities) (Amendment) Order (Northern Ireland) 1996 (S.R. 1996 No. 504)
- Moorland (Livestock Extensification) (Amendment) Regulations (Northern Ireland) 1996 (S.R. 1996 No. 505)
- Fresh Meat (Beef Controls) (Amendment) Regulations (Northern Ireland) 1996 (S.R. 1996 No. 506)
- Personal Pension Schemes (Appropriate Schemes and Disclosure of Information) (Miscellaneous Amendments) Regulations (Northern Ireland) 1996 (S.R. 1996 No. 508)
- Protected Rights (Transfer Payment) Regulations (Northern Ireland) 1996 (S.R. 1996 No. 509)
- Construction (Health, Safety and Welfare) Regulations (Northern Ireland) 1996 (S.R. 1996 No. 510)
- Health and Safety (Consultation with Employees) Regulations (Northern Ireland) 1996 (S.R. 1996 No. 511)
- Health and Safety Information for Employees (Amendments and Repeals) Regulations (Northern Ireland) 1996 (S.R. 1996 No. 512)
- Fertilisers (Sampling and Analysis) Regulations (Northern Ireland) 1996 (S.R. 1996 No. 513)
- Welfare of Animals (Scheduled Operations) (Amendment) Order (Northern Ireland) 1996 (S.R. 1996 No. 514)
- Spring Traps Approval Order (Northern Ireland) 1996 (S.R. 1996 No. 515)
- Health and Social Services Trusts (Establishment Orders) (Amendment) Order (Northern Ireland) 1996 (S.R. 1996 No. 516)
- Jobseeker's Allowance (Transitional Provisions) (No. 2) Regulations (Northern Ireland) 1996 (S.R. 1996 No. 518)
- Social Security (Back to Work Bonus) (No. 2) Regulations (Northern Ireland) 1996 (S.R. 1996 No. 519)
- Social Security Benefit (Computation of Earnings) Regulations (Northern Ireland) 1996 (S.R. 1996 No. 520)
- Social Security (Invalid Care Allowance) (Amendment) Regulations (Northern Ireland) 1996 (S.R. 1996 No. 521)
- Salaries (Assembly Ombudsman and Commissioner for Complaints) Order (Northern Ireland) 1996 (S.R. 1996 No. 522)
- Motor Hackney Carriages (Belfast) (Amendment No. 2) By-Laws (Northern Ireland) 1996 (S.R. 1996 No. 523)
- Potatoes Originating in the Netherlands (Notification) Regulations (Northern Ireland) 1996 (S.R. 1996 No. 524)
- Health and Safety at Work Order (Application to Environmentally Hazardous Substances) Regulations (Northern Ireland) 1996 (S.R. 1996 No. 525)
- Pesticides (Maximum Residue Levels in Crops, Food and Feeding Stuffs) (National Limits) (Amendment) Regulations (Northern Ireland) 1996 (S.R. 1996 No. 526)
- Pesticides (Maximum Residue Levels in Crops, Food and Feeding Stuffs) (EEC Limits) (Amendment) Regulations (Northern Ireland) 1996 (S.R. 1996 No. 527)
- Children (Prescribed Orders — Isle of Man and Guernsey) Regulations (Northern Ireland) 1996 (S.R. 1996 No. 528)
- Bus Lane (Upper Lisburn Road, Belfast) Order (Northern Ireland) 1996 (S.R. 1996 No. 530)
- Bus Lanes (Shaftesbury Square and Great Victoria Street, Belfast) Order (Northern Ireland) 1996 (S.R. 1996 No. 531)
- Disability Discrimination (Questions and Replies) Order (Northern Ireland) 1996 (S.R. 1996 No. 532)
- Pensions (1995 Order) (Commencement No. 5) Order (Northern Ireland) 1996 (S.R. 1996 No. 534)
- Temporary Speed Limit (Belfast) Order (Northern Ireland) 1996 (S.R. 1996 No. 535)
- Roads (Speed Limit) (No. 8) Order (Northern Ireland) 1996 (S.R. 1996 No. 536)
- Housing Investment Trusts (Assured Tenancies) Regulations (Northern Ireland) 1996 (S.R. 1996 No. 537)
- Specified Bovine Material (No. 2) (Amendment) Order (Northern Ireland) 1996 (S.R. 1996 No. 538)
- Eel Fishing (Licence Duties) Regulations (Northern Ireland) 1996 (S.R. 1996 No. 539)
- Fisheries (Licence Duties) Byelaws (Northern Ireland) 1996 (S.R. 1996 No. 540)
- Child Support Departure Direction and Consequential Amendments Regulations (Northern Ireland) 1996 (S.R. 1996 No. 541)
- Motor Vehicles (Driving Licences) Regulations (Northern Ireland) 1996 (S.R. 1996 No. 542)
- Motor Hackney Carriages (Belfast) (Amendment No. 3) By-Laws (Northern Ireland) 1996 (S.R. 1996 No. 543)
- Occupational Pensions (Revaluation) Order (Northern Ireland) 1996 (S.R. 1996 No. 544)
- Income Support (General) (Standard Interest Rate Amendment No. 3) Regulations (Northern Ireland) 1996 (S.R. 1996 No. 545)
- Students Awards (No. 2) (Amendment) Regulations (Northern Ireland) 1996 (S.R. 1996 No. 546)
- Employment Rights (Health Service Employers) Order (Northern Ireland) 1996 (S.R. 1996 No. 547)
- Disability Discrimination (Guidance and Code of Practice) (Appointed Day) Order (Northern Ireland) 1996 (S.R. 1996 No. 549)
- Control of Traffic (Newry) Order (Northern Ireland) 1996 (S.R. 1996 No. 550)
- Control of Traffic (Castledawson) Order (Northern Ireland) 1996 (S.R. 1996 No. 552)
- Roads (Speed Limit) (No. 9) Order (Northern Ireland) 1996 (S.R. 1996 No. 553)
- Control of Traffic (Belfast) Order (Northern Ireland) 1996 (S.R. 1996 No. 554)
- Traffic Weight Restriction (Killynamph Road, Lisnaskea) Order (Northern Ireland) 1996 (S.R. 1996 No. 555)
- Social Security (Claims and Payments) (Amendment) Regulations (Northern Ireland) 1996 (S.R. 1996 No. 556)
- Disability Discrimination (Services and Premises) Regulations (Northern Ireland) 1996 (S.R. 1996 No. 557)
- Welfare of Animals (Slaughter or Killing) Regulations (Northern Ireland) 1996 (S.R. 1996 No. 558)
- Energy Conservation Act 1996 (Commencement) Order (Northern Ireland) 1996 (S.R. 1996 No. 559)
- Disability Discrimination Act 1995 (Commencement No. 4) Order (Northern Ireland) 1996 (S.R. 1996 No. 560)
- Disability Discrimination Code of Practice (Goods, Facilities, Services and Premises) Order (Northern Ireland) 1996 (S.R. 1996 No. 561)
- Appointment of Consultants Regulations (Northern Ireland) 1996 (S.R. 1996 No. 562)
- Bovine Products (Despatch to Other Member States) Regulations (Northern Ireland) 1996 (S.R. 1996 No. 563)
- Royal Ulster Constabulary Reserve (Full-time) (Appointment and Conditions of Service) Regulations 1996 (S.R. 1996 No. 564)
- Royal Ulster Constabulary Reserve (Part-time) (Appointment and Conditions of Service) Regulations 1996 (S.R. 1996 No. 565)
- Social Security (Contributions) (Amendment No. 6) Regulations (Northern Ireland) 1996 (S.R. 1996 No. 566)
- Education (Assessment Arrangements for Key Stages 1 and 2) (Exceptions) Regulations (Northern Ireland) 1996 (S.R. 1996 No. 567)
- Temporary Speed Limit (Magheramason) (No. 2) Order (Northern Ireland) 1996 (S.R. 1996 No. 568)
- Statutory Sick Pay (General) (Amendment) Regulations (Northern Ireland) 1996 (S.R. 1996 No. 569)
- Occupational Pension Schemes (Minimum Funding Requirement and Actuarial Valuations) Regulations (Northern Ireland) 1996 (S.R. 1996 No. 570)
- Social Fund (Maternity and Funeral Expenses) (General) (Amendment No. 2) Regulations (Northern Ireland) 1996 (S.R. 1996 No. 571)
- Gaming and Amusements with Prizes (Variation of Monetary Limits) Order (Northern Ireland) 1996 (S.R. 1996 No. 572)
- Gaming (Bingo) (Amendment) Regulations (Northern Ireland) 1996 (S.R. 1996 No. 573)
- Insolvency Regulations (Northern Ireland) 1996 (S.R. 1996 No. 574)
- Deeds of Arrangement Regulations (Northern Ireland) 1996 (S.R. 1996 No. 575)
- Insolvency (Fees) (Amendment) Order (Northern Ireland) 1996 (S.R. 1996 No. 576)
- Insolvency (Deposits) (Amendment) Order (Northern Ireland) 1996 (S.R. 1996 No. 577)
- Maintenance Allowances (Pupils over Compulsory School Age) Regulations (Northern Ireland) 1996 (S.R. 1996 No. 578)
- Plastic Materials and Articles in Contact with Food (Amendment No. 2) Regulations (Northern Ireland) 1996 (S.R. 1996 No. 580)
- Industrial Tribunals (Interest on Awards in Sex and Disability Discrimination Cases) Regulations (Northern Ireland) 1996 (S.R. 1996 No. 581)
- Northern Ireland Civil Service Pensions (Provision of Information and Administrative Charges etc.) Scheme (Northern Ireland) 1996 (S.R. 1996 No. 82)
- Disability Working Allowance and Family Credit (General) (Amendment) Regulations (Northern Ireland) 1996 (S.R. 1996 No. 583)
- Occupational Pension Schemes (Investment) Regulations (Northern Ireland) 1996 (S.R. 1996 No. 584)
- Occupational Pension Schemes (Deficiency on Winding Up, etc.) Regulations (Northern Ireland) 1996 (S.R. 1996 No. 585)
- Motor Vehicles (International Circulation) (Amendment) Order (Northern Ireland) 1996 (S.R. 1996 No. 588)
- Child Support (Miscellaneous Amendments No. 2) Regulations (Northern Ireland) 1996 (S.R. 1996 No. 590)
- Diseases of Animals (Modification No. 5) Order (Northern Ireland) 1996 (S.R. 1996 No. 591)
- Diseases of Animals (Modification No. 4) Order (Northern Ireland) 1996 (S.R. 1996 No. 592)
- Bovine Spongiform Encephalopathy (Amendment) (No. 2) Order (Northern Ireland) 1996 (S.R. 1996 No. 593)
- Specified Bovine Material (Treatment and Disposal) (No. 3) (Amendment) Regulations (Northern Ireland) 1996 (S.R. 1996 No. 594)
- Selective Cull (Enforcement of Community Compensation Conditions) Regulations (Northern Ireland) 1996 (S.R. 1996 No. 595)
- Specified Bovine Material (No. 2) (Amendment No. 2) Order (Northern Ireland) 1996 (S.R. 1996 No. 596)
- Bovine Products (Despatch to Other Member States) (Amendment) Regulations (Northern Ireland) 1996 (S.R. 1996 No. 597)
- Unfair Arbitration Agreements (Specified Amount) Order (Northern Ireland) 1996 (S.R. 1996 No. 598)

== 601-700 ==
- Social Security (Incapacity for Work and Miscellaneous Amendments) Regulations (Northern Ireland) 1996 (S.R. 1996 No. 601)
- Control of Asbestos in Water (Amendment) Regulations (Northern Ireland) 1996 (S.R. 1996 No. 602)
- Surface Waters (Abstraction for Drinking Water) (Classification) Regulations (Northern Ireland) 1996 (S.R. 1996 No. 603)
- Employment Protection (Continuity of Employment) Regulations (Northern Ireland) 1996 (S.R. 1996 No. 604)
- Deseasonalisation Premium (Protection of Payments) Regulations (Northern Ireland) 1996 (S.R. 1996 No. 605)
- Environmentally Sensitive Areas Designation Orders (Amendment) Regulations (Northern Ireland) 1996 (S.R. 1996 No. 606)
- Moorland (Livestock Extensification) (Amendment No. 2) Regulations (Northern Ireland) 1996 (S.R. 1996 No. 607)
- Habitat Improvement (Amendment) Regulations (Northern Ireland) 1996 (S.R. 1996 No. 608)
- Countryside Access (Amendment) Regulations (Northern Ireland) 1996 (S.R. 1996 No. 609)
- Organic Farming Aid (Amendment) Regulations (Northern Ireland) 1996 (S.R. 1996 No. 610)
- Beef Special Premium (Protection of Payments) Regulations (Northern Ireland) 1996 (S.R. 1996 No. 611)
- Laganside Development (Alteration of Designated Area) Order (Northern Ireland) 1996 (S.R. 1996 No. 612)
- Road Humps (Amendment) Regulations (Northern Ireland) 1996 (S.R. 1996 No. 613)
- Traffic Signs (Amendment No. 4) Regulations (Northern Ireland) 1996 (S.R. 1996 No. 614)
- Temporary Speed Limit (Belfast) (No. 2) Order (Northern Ireland) 1996 (S.R. 1996 No. 615)
- Urban Clearways (Londonderry) (Amendment) Order (Northern Ireland) 1996 (S.R. 1996 No. 616)
- Roads (Speed Limit) (No. 10) Order (Northern Ireland) 1996 (S.R. 1996 No. 617)
- Contracting-out (Transfer and Transfer Payment) Regulations (Northern Ireland) 1996 (S.R. 1996 No. 618)
- Occupational Pension Schemes (Transfer Values) Regulations (Northern Ireland) 1996 (S.R. 1996 No. 619)
- Personal and Occupational Pension Schemes (Preservation of Benefit and Perpetuities) (Amendment) Regulations (Northern Ireland) 1996 (S.R. 1996 No. 620)
- Occupational Pension Schemes (Winding Up) Regulations (Northern Ireland) 1996 (S.R. 1996 No. 621)
- Social Security (Child Maintenance Bonus) Regulations (Northern Ireland) 1996 (S.R. 1996 No. 622)
- Control of Traffic (Belfast) (No. 2) Order (Northern Ireland) 1996 (S.R. 1996 No. 623)
