= Firearms Act =

Stock short title used for legislation

Firearms Act is a stock short title used for legislation in Canada, Hong Kong, Jamaica, and the United Kingdom. This list includes not only Firearms Acts as such, but legislation of different names governing firearms and also other weapons.

== List ==
=== Canada ===
- Firearms Act (Canada)

=== Finland ===
- The Firearms Act 1998

=== Hong Kong ===
- The Firearms and Ammunition Ordinance 1981

=== Jamaica ===
- Firearms Act (Jamaica)

=== United Kingdom ===
Many laws governing possession and use of firearms have been passed over the years in the UK and the countries comprising the union; there is a historical discussion at Gun politics in the United Kingdom#Gun control legislation in the United Kingdom

- The English Assize of Arms of 1181 and Assize of Arms of 1252 governed arms, but predated firearms
- The 1508 act forbidding the use of guns or crossbows without royal letters patent
- The Cross-bows, etc. Act 1514 (6 Hen. 8. c. 13) "Acte Avoidyng Shoting in Crossebowes and Gonnes"
- The Cross-bows Act 1541 (33 Hen. 8. c. 6) introducing hunting licenses
- The Hail-shot Act 1548 (2 & 3 Edw. 6. c. 14), forbidding the shooting of birdshot
- The Better Ordering the Forces Act 1663 (15 Cha. 2. c. 4), for Ordering the Forces in the several Counties of the Kingdom
- The Bill of Rights 1689 (1 Will. & Mar. Sess. 2. c. 2), England
- The Disarming Act 1716 (1 Geo. 1. St. 2. c. 54) and Disarming Act 1725 (11 Geo. 1. c. 26), Great Britain Act applicable explicitly to the Highlands of Scotland
  - The Act of Proscription 1746 (19 Geo. 2. c. 39), essentially a restatement with harsher penalties of the Disarming Acts
- The Vagrancy Act 1824 (5 Geo. 4. c. 83) providing power to arrest "... armed with any Gun, Pistol, Hanger, Cutlass, Bludgeon, or other offensive Weapon, or having upon him or her any Instrument, with Intent to commit any felonious Act;"
- The Night Poaching Act 1828 (9 Geo. 4. c. 69)
- The Game Act 1831 (1 & 2 Will. 4. c. 32)
- The Night Poaching Act 1844 (7 & 8 Vict. c. 29)
- The Poaching Prevention Act 1862 (25 & 26 Vict. c. 114)
- The Gun Licence Act 1870 (33 & 34 Vict. c. 57)
- The Pistols Act 1903 (3 Edw. 7. c. 18)
- The Firearms Act 1920 (10 & 11 Geo. 5. c. 43)
- The Firearms and Imitation Firearms (Criminal Use) Act 1933 (23 & 24 Geo. 5. c. 50)
- The Firearms Act 1934 (24 & 25 Geo. 5. c. 16)
- The Firearms (Amendment) Act 1936 (26 Geo. 5 & 1 Edw. 8. c. 39)
- The Firearms Act 1937 (1 Edw. 8 & 1 Geo. 6. c. 12)
- The Firearms Act 1965 (c. 44)
- The Firearms Act 1968 (c. 27)
- The Firearms Act 1969
- The Firearms (Dangerous Air Weapons) Rules 1969 (SI 1969/47)
- The Firearms Act 1982 (c. 31)
- The Crossbows Act 1987 (c. 32)
- The Criminal Justice (Firearms) (Northern Ireland) Order 1988 (SI 1988/1845)
- The Firearms (Amendment) Act 1988 (c. 45)
- The Firearms Rules 1989 (SI 1989/854)
- The Firearms Act (Amendment) Regulations 1992 (SI 1992/2823)
- The Firearms (Amendment) Act 1992 (c. 31)
- The Firearms (Dangerous Air Weapons) (Amendment) Rules 1993 (SI 1993/1490)
- The Firearms (Amendment) Act 1994 (c. 31)
- The Firearms (Amendment) Act 1997 (c. 5)
- The Firearms (Amendment) (No. 2) Act 1997 (c. 64)
- The Firearms (Museums) Order 1997 (SI 1997/1692)
- The Firearms Rules 1998 (SI 1998/1941)
- The Criminal Justice Act 2003 (c. 44)
- The Firearms (Appeals and Applications) Regulations (Northern Ireland) 2005 (SR(NI) 2005/3)
- The Firearms (Amendment) (Northern Ireland) Order 2005 (SI 2005/1966)
- The Firearms (Amendment) Rules 2005 (SI 2005/3344)
- The Violent Crime Reduction Act 2006 (c. 38) Part 2
- The Firearms (Amendment) Regulations 2010 (SI 2010/1759)
- The Firearms (Amendment) (No. 2) Rules 2013 (SI 2013/2970)
- The Firearms (Amendment) Rules 2013 (SI 2013/1945)
- The Firearms Regulations 2015 (SI 2015/860)

The Firearms Acts 1937 and 1965 was the collective title of the Firearms Act 1937 and the Firearms Act 1965.

== See also ==
- The Weapons Act 1990, Queensland, Australia
- German Weapons Act
- The Arms Act 1959, India
- The Arms Act 1983, New Zealand
- The Roberti-Roos Assault Weapons Control Act of 1989, California, USA
- Gun laws in the Czech Republic
