= Firearms Act 1965 =

Act of the Parliament of the United Kingdom

Firearms Act 1965 (Note: Section 11(1).)
- Act of Parliament
- Parliament of the United Kingdom
- Long title: An Act to amend the law relating to firearms, imitation firearms and ammunition; and for connected purposes.
- Citation: 1965 c. 44
- Territorial extent: England and Wales; Scotland; (Note: Section 11(4).)

Dates
- Royal assent: 5 August 1965
- Commencement: August 1965 (sections 1–6); 1 November 1965 (sections 7–9) (Note: The Firearms Act 1965 (Commencement) (No. 1) Order 1965 and the Firearms Act 1965 (Commencement) (No. 2) Order 1965.); (Note: Section 11(5).)
- Repealed: 1 August 1968
Other legislation
Amends	Firearms Act 1937
Repealed by	Firearms Act 1968

Status: Repealed

Text of statute as originally enacted

The Firearms Act 1965 (c. 44) was an act of the Parliament of the United Kingdom that introduced amendments to the law governing firearms, including provisions relating to the private sale of firearms. The act remained in force for two years before being repealed by the Firearms Act 1968, which consolidated its provisions along with those of earlier Firearm Acts.

Frank Soskice, the Secretary of State for the Home Office at the time, would state the goal of the act was "to strike at the criminal and the potential criminal, the hooligan, while limiting as much as possible the restrictions placed on the law-abiding citizen and the burden placed on the police."

== Provisions ==
Sections 1 to 4 of the act provided for additional criminal charges where an offence was committed while the offender was carrying a firearm on their person. Sections 5 and 6 empowered a police constable to search or arrest an individual where there was reasonable cause to suspect that the individual was carrying a firearm with intent to cause harm. These six sections were commenced before the end of August 1965.

Sections 7, 8, and 9 came into commencement on 1 November 1965. They empowered the local police force to revoke the licence of a registered private firearms dealer if the seller was considered to have failed to comply with the restrictions imposed upon them.

Section 3a of the act would prevent anyone who had been sentenced to detention, corrective training, or to imprisonment for a term of three months or more from possessing firearms and ammunition until five years after release.

== Subsequent developments ==
The whole act was repealed by section 59(1) of, and schedule 7 to, the Firearms Act 1968 (1968 c. 27), which came into force on 1 August 1968.

== See also ==
- Firearms (Amendment) Act 1988
- Firearms (Amendment) Act 1997 and Firearms (Amendment) (No. 2) Act 1997
