= Bruni Olympic .380 BBM =

Blank firing revolver

The Bruni BBM Olympic .380, officially marketed as the Olympic 38, is a blank-firing revolver manufactured by Italian replica firearms company Bruni. It was banned in the United Kingdom as being "readily convertible" into a "live-firing" gun.

== Design ==
The Bruni Olympic 38 is a double- and single-action blank-only revolver that is chambered for the .380/9mm R.K. (Rimmed Knall) blank cartridge and is fed by a five-round swing-out cylinder. It was the first Bruni/BBM product, which was introduced at the IWA OutdoorClassics event in Nuremberg in 1981. The Olympic is primarily available in black and nickel finishes with wood grips, while variants exported to the United Kingdom are manufactured with bright orange or blue frames for buyers without a valid legal defence in purchasing a "Realistic Imitation Firearm" as per the UK's Violent Crime Reduction Act 2006. Bruni manufactures front- and side/top-venting versions of the Olympic 38 with the latter for countries (such as the United Kingdom) with more restrictive laws on blank-firing gun replicas.

== Ban in the United Kingdom ==
The Bruni Olympic 38 was banned in the United Kingdom on June 4, 2010 following 179 police seizures of lethally-modified revolvers by criminals with some examples having been used in attempted murders. Increasing use of such modified Bruni revolvers had led to the re-assessment of its categorisation as "not readily converted" to "readily converted", resulting in it becoming a prohibited weapon under section five of the Firearms Act 1968. An amnesty for owners of the Olympic 38 to surrender their re-classified revolver was held in England and Wales from April 9 to June 4, 2010. A newer variant of the Olympic is currently sold legally in the United Kingdom with revisions to its design, such as the cylinder to prevent conversions into a lethal firearm. These are noted with a "UK 2012" inscription on the frame.

== See also ==
- Firearms regulation in the United Kingdom
