= Murders of Christine and Lucy Lee =

2014 double-murder in Surrey, England

- Location: Farnham, Surrey
- Date: 23 February 2014
- Attack type: Double-murder
- Weapon: .410 calibre shotgun
- Deaths: 2
- Victims: Christine Lee; Lucy Lee
- Perpetrator: John Lowe
- Verdict: Guilty on all counts
- Convictions: Murder (2 counts), possessing a firearm with intent to endanger life
- Sentence: Life imprisonment, 25 year minimum term

The murders of Christine and Lucy Lee occurred on 23 February 2014, near Farnham, Surrey. Christine's partner, John Lowe, was convicted of two counts of murder in October 2014 and sentenced to life imprisonment, with a minimum term of 25 years.

The case generated concerns regarding firearms licensing processes as Lowe held a shotgun certificate, which allowed him to legally possess shotguns. His certificate and shotguns were taken into custody by Surrey Police after an incident in June 2013, but were later returned to him after that case was closed. After the murders, Surrey Police apologised for the decision to return them, and an inquest raised national concerns regarding the training that Firearms enquiry officers received.

== Background ==
John Lowe owned Keepers Cottage Stud, a puppy farm near Farnham, Surrey. The farm had been subject to investigations by the RSPCA and Trading Standards, and renewal of Lowe's dog breeding licence was refused by the local council in 2004. He was later convicted of multiple offences relating to the conditions of the puppy farm. Surrey Police held twelve crime reports on Lowe before the murders, and had access to three others held by other police forces. It also held intelligence on him relating to domestic violence and drink-driving.

Lowe held a shotgun certificate issued by Surrey Police, which allowed him to legally possess shotguns. Following an incident in August 1996, where Lowe had allegedly threatened to shoot his then partner, a Surrey Police sergeant wrote in a report "[...I] therefore request that consideration be given to seizing his shotguns immediately and to revoke his license [sic] [...]". However, the department felt that there was insufficient evidence to revoke the certificate.

Lowe first met Christine Lee around 1986. Christine, along with her daughters Lucy Lee and Stacey Banner, later moved into the farm, sporadically staying there for weeks or months at a time. In June 2013, Lowe was involved in an incident in which Banner said that he had threatened her with a shotgun. As part of an investigation into this incident, Surrey Police temporarily revoked Lowe's certificate, and removed his shotguns, but later returned them to him after Banner withdrew her support for prosecution due to his age, and the case was closed with no further action taken. At the time of the murders, Lowe was 82 years old, Christine was 66 and Lucy was 40.

== Murders ==
Police were called to the farm on 23 February 2014 by Lucy Lee in a 999 call, she told them that her mother had been shot and that she was running, in fear for her life. While on the call, Lucy returned to the house to confront Lowe, and stated "I don’t know if I’m going to be alive if I go back in there.". The later court case found it likely that after this point, Lowe shot Lucy in the back of the head, reloaded his shotgun, and then followed her with the intention of killing her.

When the police arrived at the farm, they discovered Lucy deceased just outside the house, Christine deceased inside the house, and four deceased dogs outside. They had all been killed by shots from a .410 calibre shotgun. Post-mortem tests would later conclude that Christine had been shot in the chest, and Lucy had been shot in the back of the head. The police arrested Lowe at the scene, with him saying to them "They've been giving me shit for weeks.", "They had to be put down" and "They wouldn't let me eat.".

== Aftermath ==
Lowe pleaded not guilty to two counts of murder and a charge of possessing a firearm with intent to endanger life. He stated that he had his shotgun out with the intention of putting down four dogs and that the deaths occurred after several accidental discharges of his shotgun. He said that there was an initial struggle with the weapon, with Christine repeating "give me the gun", and the gun discharging when she grabbed the barrel. Lowe then stated that as he turned around, the gun discharged again, and Lucy ran out of the house. He then stated that he left the house and found Lucy lying outside with blood on her, but thought that as there wasn't a lot of blood, she wasn't badly injured. He said that after realising he had accidentally killed Christine, he intended to continue his plan to put down the dogs and then commit suicide, but as he turned around, the gun discharged again. Lowe stated that the accidental discharges likely arose due to the "ludicrous" way he held his shotgun, as a result of his arthritis.

On 29 October 2014, Lowe was found guilty on all charges. He was sentenced to life imprisonment, with a minimum term of 25 years. Lowe died in a hospice in August 2018, and the farm was later demolished.

Surrey Police issued an apology for returning Lowe's guns following the June 2013 incident, and said that the decision to do so "did not meet national standards". They referred the matter to the Independent Police Complaints Commission (IPCC), which decided to supervise an internal investigation by Surrey Police on 24 February 2014. Following external reviews by North Yorkshire Police and Hampshire Constabulary, which raised serious concerns, the IPCC decided to commission its own investigation on 29 September 2014. Three police employees were investigated for gross misconduct by the IPCC. Two police staff members were later referred to the Crown Prosecution Service, but these cases were dropped due to insufficient evidence.

=== Inquest ===
An inquest was held into the deaths from 23 May 2019 to 21 June 2019. A Regulation 28 "prevention of future deaths report" was produced from the inquest's findings. The inquest found that both victims had been unlawfully killed, and the report raised two matters of concern.

Firstly, it raised a concern that there was no mandatory national training course for Firearms enquiry officers (FEOs) at the time. An optional course was available from South Yorkshire Police, and all of Surrey Police's FEOs had completed this. At the time of the report, the College of Policing was working on introducing a course, but this work was still ongoing.

Secondly, it raised a concern relating to FEOs and the assessment of medical fitness in relation to shotgun certificate applications. Prior to the murders, Lowe had failed to declare certain medical conditions on his certificate renewal application, and a concern was raised that he was suffering from Alzheimer's disease. The certificate form only asked applicants to declare certain conditions, as well as "any other relevant condition", without providing further guidance to what other conditions may be relevant. A concern was raised that FEOs did not have the training to reliably assess the substantial list of medical conditions provided to them.

Following the 2021 Plymouth shootings, similar concerns were raised in relation to Police returning a shotgun to an unsuitable person. The College of Policing piloted a training course in September 2024, announcing in November 2024 that it would be mandatory for all FEOs going forward.
