= Arms Act =

The Arms Act may refer to the following:

- The Arms Act, 1959 in India
- The Arms Act (New Zealand), 1983 in New Zealand
- The Protection of Lawful Commerce in Arms Act, 2005 in the United States

== See also ==
- Firearms Act
