= Firearms enquiry officer =

UK police position

A firearms enquiry officer (FEO) is a member of police staff in United Kingdom police forces. They are responsible for investigation issues related to firearms and explosives licensing.

== Role ==
FEOs carry out enquiries and background checks as part of the application process for Firearms Certificates, Shotgun Certificates and explosives licenses. They seek to establish that the applicant has sound reason to possess the articles for which they are applying, and ensure that the applicant has no record of violent or firearms-related crimes, or a history of mental instability. FEOs carry out personal visits to applicants' homes to ensure that they meet the legal requirements regarding secure storage. They perform similar checks when licences are renewed, to reassess licensees.

FEOs also make visits to the homes of licensed firearm owners and shooting clubs to assess the security that the firearms are kept in; if this is not up to standard the licence may be put in jeopardy.

FEOs are full-time members of staff employed by the specific Police Force that they work for, and usually part of an enquiry team, though in smaller stations they may work on their own.

== Training and professional practice ==
Until 2023, there was no standardised national training for FEOs, with Continuous Professional Development considered solely a personal responsibility. West Yorkshire Police offered an Explosives Liaison Officer Course. Provision of appropriate role training was recommended by the Cullen Inquiry into the 1996 Dunblane massacre, but this recommendation was not implemented by Police or the Home Office.

In 2019, the inquest into the 2014 Murders of Christine and Lucy Lee raised the concern that there was no mandatory national training course available for Firearms enquiry officers. The report was concerned that without a mandatory course, further deaths could be risked.

During the inquests into the 2021 Plymouth shooting, FEOs from Devon and Cornwall Police gave evidence that no specific training for the role had been provided in twenty years, and that tools such as risk matrixes were not used. Despite having been cautioned for assault, and required to complete an anger management course, the perpetrator's Shotgun Certificate had been reinstated weeks before the killings. The inquest found that an unsafe culture had existed in the firearms licensing office, following decades of failure to properly train and supervise staff.

Following the shooting, the College of Policing reviewed the Authorised Professional Practice relating to Firearms Licensing, including a public consultation.

In June 2023, CC Debbie Tedds - firearms licensing lead at the National Police Chiefs Council (NPCC) - announced that a national training programme for FEOs would be introduced by 2024.

In July 2024, stakeholders were involved in developing course material, and a pilot couse was run in September 2024. In November 2024, it was announced the course would be mandatory for all FEOs going forward.
