= Firearms (Amendment) Act 1988 =

Act of the Parliament of the United Kingdom

Firearms (Amendment) Act 1988 (Note: Section 27(1).)
- Act of Parliament
- Parliament of the United Kingdom
- Long title: An Act to amend the Firearms Act 1968 and to make further provision for regulating the possession of, and transactions relating to, firearms and ammunition.
- Citation: 1988 c. 45
- Territorial extent: England and Wales; Scotland; Northern Ireland (section 1); (Note: Section 27(4).)

Dates
- Royal assent: 15 November 1988
- Commencement: In part at royal assent; most at 1 February 1989; wholly in force at 2 April 1991 (Note: Section 27(3).)
Other legislation
| Amends | Firearms Act 1968; Customs and Excise Management Act 1979 |
| Amended by | Firearms Acts (Amendment) Regulations 1992; Armed Forces Act 1996; Firearms (Amendment) Act 1997; Firearms (Amendment) (No. 2) Act 1997; Police Reform Act 2002; Anti-social Behaviour Act 2003; Criminal Justice Act 2003; Firearms (Electronic Communications) Order 2011; Police and Fire Reform (Scotland) Act 2012 (Consequential Provisions and Modifications) Order 2013; Firearms (Variation of Fees) Order 2015; Policing and Crime Act 2017; Law Enforcement and Security (Amendment) (EU Exit) Regulations 2019; Sentencing Act 2020; Criminal Justice Act 2003 (Commencement No. 33) and Sentencing Act 2020 (Commencement No. 2) Regulations 2022; Judicial Review and Courts Act 2022 (Magistrates’ Court Sentencing Powers) Regulations 2023; Firearms (Variation of Fees) Order 2025 |

Status: Amended

Text of statute as originally enacted

Revised text of statute as amended

Text of the Firearms (Amendment) Act 1988 as in force today (including any amendments) within the United Kingdom, from legislation.gov.uk.

The Firearms (Amendment) Act 1988 (c. 45) is an act of the Parliament of the United Kingdom, which is still in force. The act, as amended, tightens controls on the possession of firearms, and applies throughout the whole of the United Kingdom except for Northern Ireland. On 15 November 1988, the Act gained royal assent. The Act was partly in force at royal assent (see s. 27(3)). On 1 February 1989, fourteen sections (in whole or in part) of the first 25 sections of the Act came into force. On 2 April 1991, the Act came wholly into force.

== Background ==
The act was passed in response to the Hungerford massacre of 1987, in which a legally owned Type 56 assault rifle was used as part of a spree shooting in which 16 people were shot dead.

== Provisions ==
The act amended Section 5 of the Firearms Act 1968, which defined the class of prohibited weapons, by extending it to cover burst fire firearms, semi-automatic and pump action rifles other than those chambered for .22 rimfire ammunition, semi-automatic and pump action smoothbore guns other than those chambered for .22 rimfire and with a barrel shorter than 24 inches in length or an overall length less than 40 inches (to be measured without detachable stocks or with folding stocks folded), smoothbore revolvers other than muzzle-loaders or one chambered for 9 mm calibre rimfire ammunition, and finally any rocket-launcher or mortar which fired a stabilised missile. It also prohibited exploding ammunition, as well as ammunition containing noxious substances and any form of grenade or shell designed to be projected from a firearm.

Additionally, section 1(4) of the Act gave the Home Secretary the power to prohibit any firearm or type of ammunition not on the list, provided that it had not been widely sold in Britain before 1988, and that it appeared to be "specially dangerous" or constructed so as to evade metal detectors.

Section 2 amended the 1968 Act to limit the type of shotguns which required a shotgun certificate instead of a firearm certificate; this was now defined as a shotgun which had a barrel longer than 24 inches, a calibre of under two inches (50.8mm), and no magazine larger than a fixed two-cartridge magazine. Section 3 amended the regulations for issuing a shotgun licence, allowing the police to refuse a licence if the applicant was felt not to have a good reason for possessing a shotgun, or was believed to be prohibited by the Act. Section 5 prohibited the sale of shotgun ammunition except to someone entitled under the Act to possess a shotgun, or someone acting on their behalf.

The Act made it an offence to modify a shotgun to have a barrel less than 24 inches in length, and stipulated that a prohibited weapon which had been converted into another type of weapon remained prohibited with the exception of the fitting of a barrel longer than 24 inches to a pump action or semi-automatic shotgun that had previously had a shorter barrel fitted. However, a prohibited firearm could be "deactivated" and thus no longer fall under the scope of the Act.

Sections 9 through 12 governed the issuing of firearm certificates, whilst section 13 modified the regulations involving firearms dealers and section 14 required people transporting or storing firearms to store them securely and report any loss to the police.

There were a number of specified exemptions to the requirement for a licence; members of approved rifle or pistol clubs were allowed to carry and use firearms when target shooting even if they did not themselves hold a licence, and someone over the age of seventeen was allowed to borrow a legally held firearm from its owner and use it, under supervision of the owner and complying with the owner's licence, on private premises. Foreign visitors could hold a "visitor's permit", which allowed them to possess any legal firearm without a licence; this licence would be granted by the local police. It was also possible to purchase a firearm without a licence if it was intended to be promptly exported. Finally, firearms in museums were exempted from certain provisions.

== Amendments ==
- Firearms (Amendment) Act 1997: introduced in response to the Dunblane school massacre and the recommendations of the Cullen Report that followed it. It effectively banned the possession of all handguns other than those chambered for .22 calibre rimfire cartridges by civilians in most of the United Kingdom.
- Firearms (Amendment) (No. 2) Act 1997: introduced in response to the Snowdrop Petition that followed the Dunblane Massacre. This new (No. 2) act further banned the private possession of all cartridge ammunition handguns, regardless of calibre.

== See also ==
- Firearms regulation in the United Kingdom
