= List of acts of the Parliament of England from 1679 =

This is a list of acts of the Parliament of England for the year 1679.

For acts passed during the period 1707–1800, see the list of acts of the Parliament of Great Britain. See also the list of acts of the Parliament of Scotland, and the list of acts of the Parliament of Ireland.

For acts passed from 1801 onwards, see the list of acts of the Parliament of the United Kingdom. For acts of the devolved parliaments and assemblies in the United Kingdom, see the list of acts of the Scottish Parliament, the list of acts of the Northern Ireland Assembly, and the list of acts and measures of Senedd Cymru; see also the list of acts of the Parliament of Northern Ireland.

For medieval statutes, etc. that are not considered to be acts of Parliament, see the list of English statutes.

See also the List of ordinances and acts of the Parliament of England, 1642–1660 for ordinances and acts passed by the Long Parliament and other bodies without royal assent, and which were not considered to be valid legislation following the Restoration in 1660.

The number shown after each act's title is its chapter number. Acts are cited using this number, preceded by the years of the reign during which the relevant parliamentary session was held; thus the Union with Ireland Act 1800 is cited as "39 & 40 Geo. 3. c. 67", meaning the 67th act passed during the session that started in the 39th year of the reign of George III and which finished in the 40th year of that reign. The modern convention is to use Arabic numerals in citations (thus "41 Geo. 3" rather than "41 Geo. III"). Acts of the last session of the Parliament of Great Britain and the first session of the Parliament of the United Kingdom are both cited as "41 Geo. 3".

Acts passed by the Parliament of England did not have a short title; however, some of these acts have subsequently been given a short title by acts of the Parliament of the United Kingdom, such as the Short Titles Act 1896 (59 & 60 Vict. c. 14).

Acts passed by the Parliament of England were deemed to have come into effect on the first day of the session in which they were passed. Because of this, the years given in the list below may in fact be the year before a particular act was passed.

== 31 Cha. 2 ==
The 3rd Parliament of King Charles II (the 'Habeas Corpus Parliament') which met from 6 March 1679 until 12 July 1679.

This session was also traditionally cited as 31 Car. 2 (Chronological Table of the Statutes), 31 Chas. 2 or 31 C. 2.

=== Public acts ===
Short title	Citation	Royal assent
Long title
Billeting Act 1679 (repealed)	31 Cha. 2. c. 1	9 May 1679
An Act for granting a Supply to His Majestie of Two hundred and six thousand fower hundred sixtie two pounds seventeene shillings and three pence for paying off and disbanding the Forces raised since the nine and twentyeth of September one thousand six hundred and seaventy seaven. (Repealed by Statute Law Revision Act 1966 (c. 5))
Habeas Corpus Act 1679	31 Cha. 2. c. 2	27 May 1679
An Act for the better securing the Liberty of the Subject, and for Prevention of Imprisonment beyond the Seas.
Records of Fires Burnt, etc. Act 1679 (repealed)	31 Cha. 2. c. 3	27 May 1679
An Act for reingrossing of the Records of Fines burnt or lost in the late Fire in the Temple. (Note: Middle Temple fire, January 1679.) (Repealed by Statute Law Revision Act 1863 (26 & 27 Vict. c. 125))

=== Private acts ===
Short title	Citation	Royal assent
Long title
Drake Estates Act 1679	31 Cha. 2. c. 4 Pr.	9 May 1679
An Act to confirm certain Leases made by John Drake and others; and to enable Sir Francis Drake (Note: Sir Francis Drake, 3rd Baronet.) to make a Jointure and raise Portions for his Daughters and younger Children.
Dale's Estate Act 1679	31 Cha. 2. c. 5 Pr.	27 May 1679
An Act for Sale of the Lands of Charles Dale, (Note: Charles Dale of Tixover, Rutland.) of the County of Rutland, Esquire, deceased, for Payment of his Debts, and Provision for his Daughters and Coheirs.

=== Sources ===
- Raithby, John, ed. (1963) [1819]. "31° Car. II.". Statutes of the Realm. Vol. 5: The Statutes of King Charles I and King Charles II (1625–1680). London: Dawsons. pp. 897–939 – via HathiTrust.
- Raithby, John, ed. (1819). Statutes of the Realm. Vol. 5: 1628-80 – via British History Online.
- Pickering, Danby, ed. (1763). "Anno tricesimo primo Caroli II". The Statutes at Large. Vol. 8: From the Twelfth Year of King Charles II to the Last Year of King James II. Inclusive. Cambridge: Joseph Bentham. pp. 432–440 – via Internet Archive.
- Journal of the House of Commons. Vol. 9. London: His Majesty's Stationery Office. 1803. pp. 567–634 – via Google Books.
- Chronological Table of and Index to the Statutes. Vol. 1: To the End of the Session 59 Vict. Sess. 2 (1895) (13th ed.). London: Her Majesty's Stationery Office. 1896. pp. 73–74 – via Google Books.
- "Acts of the English Parliament from 1679". legislation.gov.uk. The National Archives.
- Chronological Table of the Statutes: Covering the Period from 1235 to the End of 1971. London: Her Majesty's Stationery Office. 1972. p. 71. ISBN 978-0-11-840096-1 – via Google Books.
- "Chronological Tables of the Private and Personal Acts: Part 3 (1660–1680)". legislation.gov.uk. The National Archives.

== See also ==
- List of acts of the Parliament of England
