= Sunday Express Dunblane controversy =

Controversial 2009 British press article

The Scottish edition of the Sunday Express newspaper published a front page article by Paula Murray on 8 March 2009, "Anniversary Shame of Dunblane Survivors", which was critical of survivors of the Dunblane massacre, by then aged 18 and 19, for posting "shocking blogs and photographs of themselves on the Internet". The "shocking" content, read from the survivors' social networking pages, with Bebo being mentioned in the article, included colloquial language and some swearing, mentions of sex and alcohol and joking references to a confrontation (interpreted by the tabloid as a "boast" about "getting in fights") and to being a "Scottish terrorist" in London. The article received a great deal of negative attention given the tenuous grounds for making the attacks. Survivors and members of the public complained to the UK Press Complaints Commission.

The news article was removed from the Daily Express web site, but continued to provoke strong reactions, particularly among the blogging community. An online petition was drawn up asking for a front-page apology from the paper, as well as disciplinary action against the journalist and editor responsible; by 30 March, when it closed, it had attracted 11,186 signatures.

Liz Smith, a Member of Scottish Parliament, was also criticised for describing the contents of some blogs as "in bad taste", a comment that was implied by the article to apply to those of the Dunblane survivors. She later claimed that her comments were quoted out of context, and were directed at teenage bloggers in general; a claim disputed by the Scottish Sunday Express editor Derek Lambie.

== Apology ==
On 22 March, the Scottish Sunday Express printed an apology, stating that: "Our front-page story about the teenage survivors of the Dunblane massacre and their use of social networking websites has caused terrible offence, not only in that town, but across Scotland and around the world. Where possible, we have spoken to the families involved and given them a heartfelt apology. Today we apologise to you, our loyal readers."

The organisers of the online petition criticised the apology as "inadequate", stating that it "dodges the issue of what was wrong with the original article, fails to provide a satisfactory explanation for how this piece happened, holds nobody to account for its publication and offers no reassurance that this won't happen again".

== Press Complaints Commission ==
On 22 June 2009, the Press Complaints Commission issued an adjudication stating that the paper had made a "serious error of judgement" and further remarked that the subjects of the article "were not public figures in any meaningful sense, and the newsworthy event that they had been involved in as young children had happened 13 years previously ... since then they had done nothing to warrant media scrutiny, and the images appeared to have been taken out of context and presented in a way that was designed to humiliate or embarrass them."

Whilst noting the newspaper's apology, the Commission ruled that "the breach of the Code was so serious that no apology could remedy it", and upheld the complainants' claim that it "had only been made because of a national outcry and a petition which had attracted 11,000 signatures."
