= Billeting Act 1679 =

Act of the Parliament of England

Billeting Act 1679 (Note: The citation of this act by this short title was authorised by section 5 of, and the second schedule to, the Statute Law Revision Act 1948. Due to the repeal of those provisions, it is now authorised by section 19(2) of the Interpretation Act 1978.)
- Act of Parliament
- Parliament of England
- Long title: An Act for granting a Supply to His Majestie of Two hundred and six thousand fower hundred sixtie two pounds seventeene shillings and three pence for paying off and disbanding the Forces raised since the nine and twentyeth of September one thousand six hundred and seaventy seaven. (Note: These words are printed against this act in the second column of the second schedule to the Statute Law Revision Act 1948, which is headed "Title".)
- Citation: 31 Cha. 2. c. 1
- Territorial extent: England and Wales

Dates
- Royal assent: 9 May 1679
- Commencement: 6 March 1679 (Note: Start of session.)
- Repealed: 10 March 1966
Other legislation
Amended by	Statute Law Revision Act 1863
Repealed by	Statute Law Revision Act 1966

Status: Repealed

Text of statute as originally enacted

The Billeting Act 1679 (31 Cha. 2. c. 1) was an act of the Parliament of England.

== Subsequent developments ==
The whole act, except section 32, was repealed by section 1 of, and the schedule to, the Statute Law Revision Act 1966, which came into force on 10 March 1966.

The whole act was repealed by section 1 of, and the schedule to, the Statute Law Revision Act 1966, which came into force on 10 March 1966.
