= Derek Lambie =

- Occupation: Journalist, writer

Derek Lambie is the former editor of the Scottish edition of the Sunday Express (2002–2012).

He graduated with a BA Hons in Film & Media Studies from University of Stirling in 1997, then worked with a freelance press agency in Stirling before joining the Scottish Daily Express in 2000. The same year, he was given a Scottish Society of Editors Newcomer of the Year award. In 2002, he was appointed as Editor of the Scottish edition of the Sunday Express in Glasgow.

Lambie was editor at the time of the Sunday Express Dunblane controversy. He left in 2012 as part of a cost-cutting programme. He subsequently worked as freelance, writing the book A Mother's War, about trainee deaths at Deepcut army barracks.
