= Game Act 1831 =

Act of the Parliament of the United Kingdom

Game Act 1831 (Note: The citation of this act by this short title was authorised by section 1 of, and the first schedule to, the Short Titles Act 1896. Due to the repeal of those provisions it is now authorised by section 19(2) of the Interpretation Act 1978.)
- Act of Parliament
- Parliament of the United Kingdom
- Long title: An Act to amend the Laws in England relative to Game.
- Citation: 1 & 2 Will. 4. c. 32
- Territorial extent: England and Wales (Note: Section 48.) (Note: The provisions of the act regarding game dealing licences were subsequently extended across the United Kingdom by section 13 of the Game Licences Act 1860 (23 & 24 Vict. c. 90).)

Dates
- Royal assent: 5 October 1831
- Commencement: 1 November 1831 (Note: Section 1.)
Other legislation
Amends	13 Ric. 2. Stat. 1. c. 13; Swans Act 1482; Game, etc. Act 1495; Game Act 1773; Partridges Act 1799; Preservation of Game Act 1818
Repeals/revokes	Deer, etc. Act 1503; Killing Hares Act 1523; Wild-fowl Act 1533; Cross-bows Act 1541; Game Act 1580; Game Act 1603; Game Act 1609; Game Act 1670; Game Act 1692; Game Act 1706; Game Act 1710; Game Act 1721; Offences Against Persons and Property Act 1736; Game Act 1753; Game Act 1755; Game Act 1762; Game (England) Act 1772; Preservation of Black Game Act 1803; Gamekeepers Act 1808; Black Game in Somerset and Devon Act 1810; Gamekeepers, Wales Act 1819
Amended by	Game Licences Act 1860; Statute Law Revision Act 1874; Summary Jurisdiction Act 1884; Public Authorities Protection Act 1893; Justices of the Peace Act 1949; Statute Law Revision Act 1958; Crown Estate Act 1961; Courts Act 1971; Wild Creatures and Forest Laws Act 1971; Statute Law (Repeals) Act 1976; Statute Law (Repeals) Act 1993; Hunting Act 2004
Relates to	Game (Scotland) Act 1832; Statute Law Revision Act 1861; Gun Licence Act 1870; Statute Law (Ireland) Revision Act 1872; Statute Law (Repeals) Act 1978

Status: Amended

Text of statute as originally enacted

Text of the Game Act 1831 as in force today (including any amendments) within the United Kingdom, from legislation.gov.uk.

The Game Act 1831 (1 & 2 Will. 4. c. 32) is an act of the Parliament of the United Kingdom, which was passed to protect game birds by establishing a close season during which they could not be legally taken. The act also established the need for game licences and the appointing of gamekeepers. It has covered the protection of game birds to this day.

== Game covered ==
The act designated certain species as game birds and their open season, when they may be shot:

- Red grouse (Moor Game), 12 August – 10 December
- Black grouse (Black Game), 20 August – 10 December
- Pheasant, 1 October – 1 February
- Partridge, 1 September – 1 February

As well as adhering to the seasons, game may not be taken on Sundays or Christmas Day.

The great bustard was protected under the act, with its open season decided as 1 September to 1 March. This protection was little use, however, as the great bustard became extinct in Great Britain in the 1830s. It is currently part of a reintroduction programme.

Capercaillie are not protected in the act, as they were extinct in Britain at the time. They were reintroduced to Scotland in 1837.

Brown hares are mentioned in the act but have no closed season. Two Hares Acts were passed in the 19th century. The first, in 1848, removed the requirement for a game certificate for occupiers to kill hares, regulated where hunting could take place, and the banned of baiting with poison. The second, in 1892, among other things, prohibited the sale of hare meat between March and July, which is the animals' breeding season.

== Game licences ==
The act made it lawful to take game only with the provision of a game licence. Also, it made an excise licence necessary to deal with game.

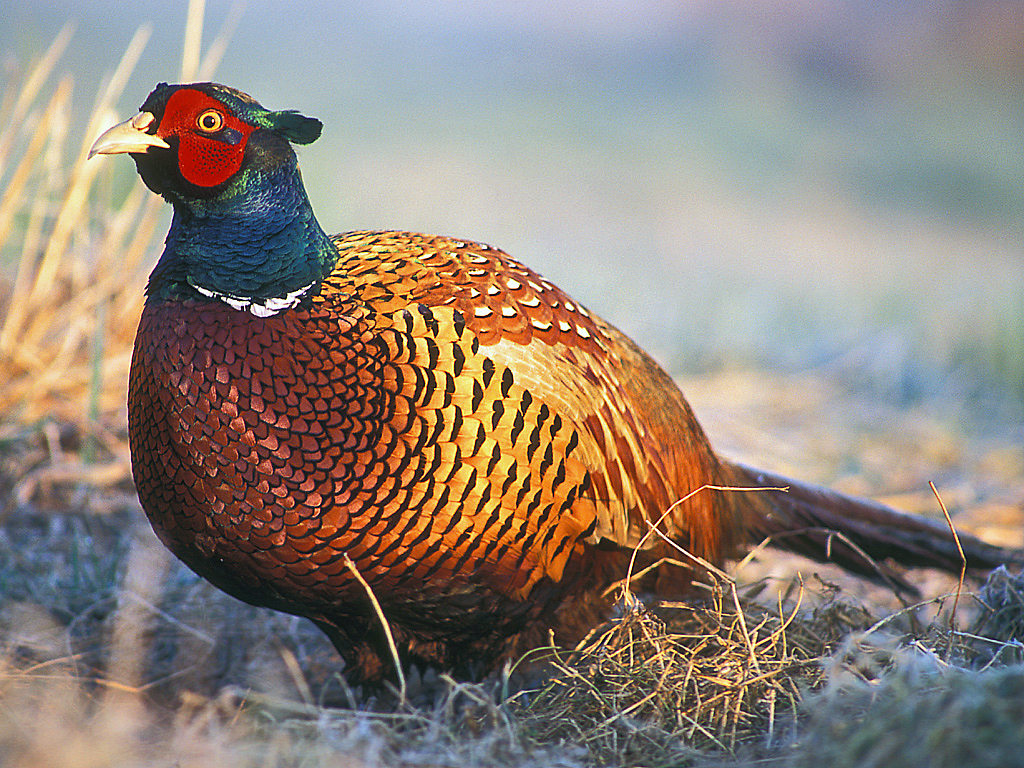
The Game Act 1831 protects game birds in England and Wales.

Game licences were abolished in England and Wales on 1 August 2007, as well as the need for game dealers licences, and the law changed to allow selling game, except hare, year round. In Northern Ireland, game licences and game dealing licences were abolished on 13 June 2011. In Scotland, game licences and game dealing licences were abolished on 29 June 2011.

== Gamekeepers ==
The act listed requirements on the appointment of gamekeepers and on the issuing of a gamekeepers licence on an estate.

== Other birds ==
Although it is not included in the act, a game licence was required to shoot woodcock and common snipe until 1 August 2007. Wildfowl are protected and their close seasons are stated in the Wildlife and Countryside Act 1981.

== Subsequent developments ==
Due to the limited territorial extent of the act to England and Wales, the acts repealed by this act were subsequently repealed by the Statute Law Revision Act 1861 (24 & 25 Vict. c. 101), the Statute Law (Ireland) Revision Act 1872 (35 & 36 Vict. c. 98) and the Statute Law (Repeals) Act 1978.

Section 47 of the act was repealed by section 2 of, and the schedule to, the Public Authorities Protection Act 1893 (56 & 57 Vict. c. 61), which came into force on 1 January 1894.

In section 46 of the act, the words " and may be given in evidence under the general issue " were repealed by section 3 of, and the third schedule to, the Statute Law Revision Act 1958 (6 & 7 Eliz. 2. c. 46), which came into force on 23 July 1958.

Section 45 of the act was repealed by section 1(1) of, and part XIX of schedule 1 to, the Statute Law (Repeals) Act 1976, which came into force on 27 May 1976.

Section 42 of the act was repealed by section 1(1) of, and group 1 of part I of schedule 1 to, the Statute Law (Repeals) Act 1993, which came into force on 5 November 1993.

== Bibliography ==
- Halsbury's Statutes of England. Third Edition. Butterworths. London. 1969. Volume 14. Pages 448 to 469.
- "The Game Act, 1831". Halsbury's Statutes of England. (The Complete Statutes of England). First Edition. 1929. Volume 8: . Page 1066.
- J M Lely. "The Game Act, 1831". The Statutes of Practical Utility. (Chitty's Statutes). Fifth Edition. Sweet and Maxwell. Stevens and Sons. London. 1894. Volume 4. Title "Game". Pages 5 to 23.
- Welsby and Beavan. Chitty's Collection of Statutes, with Notes thereon. Third Edition. Henry Sweet. Stevens and Sons. London. 1865. Volume 2. Title "Game". Pages 234 to 249.
- James Paterson. "Game Act". The Game Laws of the United Kingdom. Shaw and Sons. London. 1861. Pages 1 to 83.
- John Locke. The Game Laws. Second Edition. Shaw and Sons. London. 1840. Pages 1 to 60. Fourth Edition. 1856. Pages 93 to 178.
- William Gurdon. "New Game Act". The Statutes in Force Relating to the Preserving and Killing of Game. Saunders and Benning. London. 1839. Pages 47 to 99.
- John Collyer. The Criminal Statutes of England. Printed for S Sweet. London. Printed for W Wrightson. Birmingham. 1832. Pages 698 to 711. Note is at pages 710 and 711.
- A F Jenkin. "The Game Act, 1831". The Law Relating to Parish Councils. Knight & Co. London. 1894. Pages 396 to 398.
- Pudney v Eccles (1892) 17 Cox CC 594
