= Firearms (Amendment) Act 1997 =

Act of the Parliament of the United Kingdom

Firearms (Amendment) Act 1997 (Note: Section 53(1).)
- Act of Parliament
- Parliament of the United Kingdom
- Long title: An Act to amend the Firearms Acts 1968 to 1992; to make provision in relation to the licensing and regulation of pistol clubs; to make further provision for regulating the possession of, and transactions relating to, firearms and ammunition; and for connected purposes.
- Citation: 1997 c. 5
- Territorial extent: England and Wales; Scotland; (Note: Section 53(5).)

Dates
- Royal assent: 27 February 1997
- Commencement: Various (Note: Section 53(3)–(4).)
Other legislation
Amends	Firearms Act 1968; Firearms (Amendment) Act 1988; Firearms (Amendment) Act 1992
Amended by	Firearms (Amendment) (No. 2) Act 1997; Scotland Act 1998 (Transfer of Functions to the Scottish Ministers etc. ) Order 1999; Firearms (Electronic Communications) Order 2011; Police and Fire Reform (Scotland) Act 2012 (Consequential Provisions and Modifications) Order 2013; Anti-social Behaviour, Crime and Policing Act 2014; Firearms Regulations 2015; Policing and Crime Act 2017
Relates to	Firearms Act 1968; Firearms (Amendment) Act 1988; Firearms (Amendment) Act 1992

Status: Amended

Text of statute as originally enacted

Revised text of statute as amended

The Firearms (Amendment) Act 1997 (c. 5) is an act of the Parliament of the United Kingdom introduced by the Conservative government of John Major, in response to the Dunblane school massacre and the recommendations of the Cullen Report that followed it.

It effectively banned the private possession of all handguns other than those chambered for .22 rimfire cartridges in Great Britain (not Northern Ireland) by making them subject to Section 5 (Prohibited Weapons) of the Firearms Acts. It also made it illegal to tranquilize a human.

Tony Blair's Labour Government followed later in the year with the Firearms (Amendment) (No. 2) Act 1997 which banned .22 handguns.

== See also ==
- Firearms regulation in the United Kingdom
