= Firearms regulation in the United Kingdom =

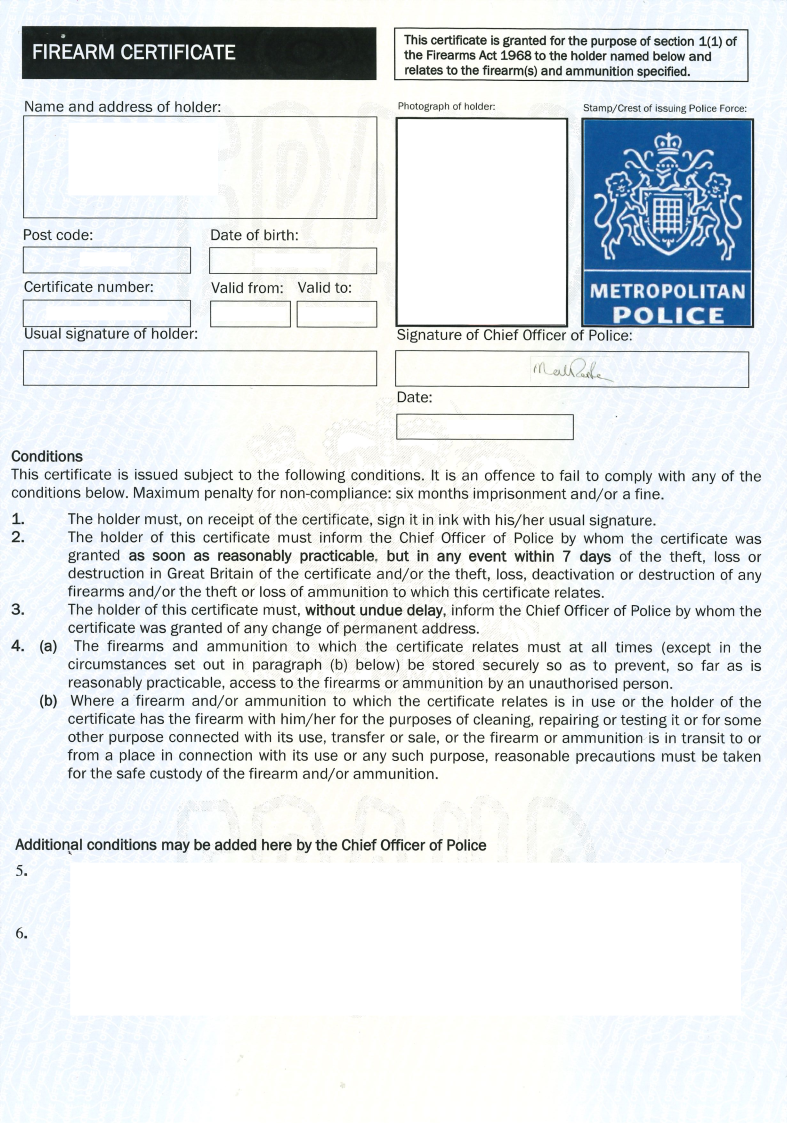
The first page of a firearm certificate issued by the Metropolitan Police. This format is common to all certificates issued in the United Kingdom.

In the United Kingdom, gun ownership is considered a privilege, not a right, and access by the general public to firearms is subject to strict control. Members of the public may own certain firearms for the purposes of sport shooting, recreation, hunting or occupational purposes, subject to licensing.

There is a uniform system of firearms licensing across Great Britain (with an additional airgun licensing scheme in Scotland), and a separate system for Northern Ireland. All firearms are registered.

As of 2026, there were 564,690 licensed firearm owners in the United Kingdom, holding approximately 2.39 million firearms.

== Great Britain ==
=== Licensing ===
With a few exceptions, all firearms must be licensed on either a five-year firearm certificate (FAC) or a shotgun certificate (SGC) issued by the police for the area in which they normally reside. Each certificate can list multiple firearms. Shotguns thus defined are subject to a less rigorous certification process than for the full FAC; an applicant is not required by law to make a good case for being granted a certificate, but the police may withhold a certificate if they consider that the applicant does not have satisfactory security in place, or granting it would constitute a danger to public safety or to the peace. A certificate holder may possess as many shotguns as can be securely stored.

When applying for a firearm certificate, justification must be provided to the police for each firearm, and they are individually listed on the certificate by type, calibre, and serial number. A shotgun certificate similarly lists type, calibre and serial number, but permits possession of as many shotguns as can be safely accommodated. To gain permission for a new firearm, a "variation" must be sought, for a fee, unless the variation is made at the time of renewal, or unless it constitutes a one-for-one replacement of an existing firearm that will be disposed of. The certificate also sets out, by calibre, the maximum quantities of ammunition someone may possess at any one time, and is used to record ammunition purchases (except where ammunition is bought to use immediately on a range under section 11 or section 15 of the Firearms Act 1968).

To obtain a firearm certificate, the police must be satisfied that a person has "good reason" to own each firearm, and that they can be trusted with it "without danger to the public safety or to the peace". Under Home Office guidelines, firearm certificates are only issued if a person has legitimate sporting, collecting, or work-related reasons for ownership. Since 1937, self-defence has not been considered a valid reason to own a firearm. The current licensing procedure involves: positive verification of identity, two referees of verifiable good character who have known the applicant for at least two years (and who may themselves be interviewed and/or investigated as part of the certification), approval of the application by the applicant's own family doctor, an inspection of the premises and cabinet where firearms will be kept and a face-to-face interview by a firearms enquiry officer (FEO), also known as a firearms liaison officer (FLO). Only when all these stages have been satisfactorily completed will a licence be issued, which must be renewed every five years.

Any person who has been sentenced to between three months and three years in prison is automatically prohibited from possessing firearms (including airguns) and ammunition for five years from release. A person who has been sentenced to more than three years is prohibited for life. Application may be made to a court to reverse these prohibitions and this is likely to be successful in relation to convictions for crimes which do not relate to a person's fitness to possess firearms. Similarly, persons applying for licences with recent, serious mental health issues will also be refused a certificate.

Any person holding a firearm or shotgun certificate must comply with strict storage conditions by storing their firearms/shotguns in a safe bolted to the floor or wall that complies to the standard BS 7558:1992. These storage arrangements are checked by the police before a licence is first granted, and on every renewal of the licence.

In the case of a firearm certificate the issuing police force may impose additional conditions over and above the statutory ones. However any condition appended to a certificate must be reasonable and must not be of such a restrictive nature as would amount to a constructive refusal to grant the certificate by making use so unlikely as to be practically impossible. Failure to comply with any of these conditions can result in criminal prosecution resulting in a prison sentence of up to six months. Revocation of the certificate is also possible, depending upon the nature of the breach. A visitor's permit is available for possession of firearms without certificate by visitors to the UK.

The penalty for possession of any type of firearm without a certificate is a maximum of 14 years in prison and an unlimited fine. The penalty for section 5 categories of firearm is subject to a mandatory minimum of five years. (The sentencing judge has discretion to depart from the minimum sentence if there are "exceptional circumstances".) The Violent Crime Reduction Act 2006 increased restrictions on the use, possession, sale and manufacture of both airguns and imitation firearms.

=== Definitions ===
Section 57 of the Firearms Act 1968 defines a firearm as:

- A lethal barrelled weapon, meaning a barrelled weapon of any description from which a shot, bullet or other missile, with kinetic energy of more than 1 joule at the muzzle of the weapon, can be discharged (with an exception for airsoft guns)
- A prohibited weapon
- A relevant component part, namely a:
  - Barrel, chamber or cylinder
  - Frame, body or receiver
  - Breech block, bolt or other mechanism for containing the pressure of discharge at the rear of a chamber

A shotgun is defined as a smooth-bore gun (which is not an air gun) and:

- Has a barrel not less than 24 inches in length and does not have any barrel with a bore exceeding 2 inches in diameter
- Either has no magazine or has a non-detachable magazine incapable of holding more than two cartridges
- Is not a revolver gun

=== Prohibited weapons ===
These weapons are subject to general prohibition under section 5 of the Firearms Act 1968:

- Automatic or burst-fire firearms
- Semi-automatic or pump-action rifled guns other than those chambered for .22 rimfire cartridges
- Manually actuated release system rifles (MARS) and lever release rifles (not to be confused with lever action).
- Most handguns (firearms with a barrel length under 30 cm (12 in) or overall length under 60 cm (24 in)), other than muzzle loading handguns and handguns that are air weapons (neither of which have minimum length thresholds).
- Firearms disguised as another item (e.g. walking sticks, mobile telephones, etc.).
- Rockets and mortars.
- Air guns chambered for self-contained gas cartridges. (Existing owners prior to 20 January 2004 were allowed ownership subject to obtaining a firearm certificate.)
- Any weapon of whatever description designed or adapted for the discharge of any noxious liquid, gas or other substance. This would generally include stun guns, or electric shock devices, CS gas (tear gas), OC spray (pepper spray), etc. Cattle prods would not generally be included, but it would depend on the type.

Firearms which previously fell into a prohibited category cannot be made legal by conversion to an otherwise permitted form. For example, a pistol which is adapted by permanently fitting a 60-centimetre (24 in) long smooth-bore barrel to it does not thereby become permitted.

=== Rifles ===
UK law does not provide a statutory definition for a "rifle". Most long firearms with rifled barrels will – by default – be classified as Section 1, and can be held on a firearm certificate. This includes single-shot; bolt-action; Martini-action; lever-action (also called under-lever action); and revolver rifles in any calibre. Self-loading and pump-action rifles are only permitted in .22 rimfire calibre.

=== Handguns ===
The 1997 acts (see below) do not ban pistols as such and are drafted in terms of "short firearms". These acts prohibit firearms with a barrel shorter than 30 cm (12 in) or an overall length less than 60 cm (24 in) In practice this includes most pistols and revolvers, with the exception of those that are air weapons, muzzle-loading (pistols and revolvers) or signalling apparatus.

A wide variety of black powder muzzle-loading handguns can still be possessed in Great Britain, plus a small number of muzzle-loading smokeless powder pistols and revolvers (in various calibres) are manufactured, such as the Westlake Taurus and Alfa Proj .357 muzzle-loading revolvers. All other handguns are mostly prohibited in Great Britain, with some exceptions such as those used for the humane dispatch of injured animals (such as deer) and some historical firearms.

That law created a new market for "long-barrelled revolvers" and "long-barrelled pistols", firearms with a permanently attached extension to the grip, with overall dimensions larger than those prohibited. Long-barrelled pistols in single-shot, or long-barrelled revolvers, both of any calibre, or semi-automatic in .22 rimfire, are all permitted with a firearm certificate.

Pistol shooting for sporting purposes was effectively banned in 1997, although a temporary exemption was made for competitors to bring section 5 firearms into the UK for the 2002 Commonwealth Games. This exemption only applied to the Games period and Home Nation pistol shooters had to train abroad prior to the Games. Ahead of the 2012 Olympic Games, Tessa Jowell (Minister for the Olympics) and the Home Secretary agreed to use Home Office powers to issue a small number of section 5 permits to elite pistol shooters nominated by British Shooting. With Glasgow winning the right to host the 2014 Commonwealth Games, this arrangement was extended beyond the Olympics, with a small number of UK ranges licensed for section 5 shooting.

A few models of ISSF 50 meter pistol (also known as "Free Pistol") have been produced which exceed the defined dimensions for prohibited "short firearms" and qualify as section 1 firearms. Some free pistols offered removable stabiliser bars; UK-legal models are manufactured with stabilisers permanently fixed. Examples include the single-shot Pardini K22 Longarm and the five-shot Westlake Britarms Long Pistol.

Antique handguns that fall under definitions in Section 58(2) of the Firearms Act 1968 may be owned privately as a "curiosity or ornament" without a license and therefore can be transferred without restrictions. The owner is not to acquire ammunition for it under these terms. Section 126 of the Policing and Crime Act 2017 and the Antique Firearms Regulations 2021 add further details regarding antique firearms. The Antique Firearms Regulations 2021 added several cartridges to the government's official comprehensive list of obsolete ammunition, whilst simultaneously revoking certain black powder centerfire revolver cartridges such as .41 Long Colt, .44 Russian, and .442 Webley due to reported criminal use of legally acquired antique firearms with corresponding ammunition for them.

==== Readily-convertible firearms ====
Specific models of blank-firing starting pistol that are deemed "readily convertible" (by the 1968 and 1982 Firearms Acts) to fire live ammunition may also be either banned or require a firearm certificate. The Bruni Olympic .380 BBM blank-firing revolver was banned in 2010 based on evidence that it was being illegally converted to fire live ammunition. In October 2024, the National Crime Agency similarly declared that all top/side-venting blank-firing pistol replicas by various Turkish companies, which were previously sold legally in the United Kingdom were officially reclassified by the Home Office as being "readily convertible" and thus should be considered by the English and Welsh courts to be section 5 firearms.

The decision was made following several police seizures of modified blank pistols and at least four murders being committed using similar weapons in the previous two years. Legal owners of such blank-firing replicas in England and Wales were expected to surrender them by 28 February 2025 in an amnesty, but received no compensation for losses that could stretch to many hundreds or thousands of pounds. In early September 2025, a very similar illegalisation and amnesty process again in England and Wales was announced for February 2026 for several blank-firing handguns manufactured by Italian blank gun company Bruni, with the National Crime Agency also alleging that they are "readily convertible".

There has been no equivalent announcement from the Scottish Government, who have executive control over the Scottish courts and legal system, and no equivalent amnesties were announced by Police Scotland, so the status of these blank firers remains somewhat uncertain in Scotland. As of June 2026, only one publication posted by Police Scotland has acknowledged this, in which they reiterate the illegality of readily convertible blank firearms.

=== Shotguns ===
Single-, double-, or triple-barrelled shotguns, or those with a lever-action, bolt-action, pump-action, or semi-automatic action and fixed magazine capacity of no more than two cartridges are permitted on a shotgun certificate as long as they meet the criteria of having a minimum barrel length of 24 inches (61 cm), overall length of 40 inches (100 cm), and a non-detachable magazine (if present).

There is no limit on the number of guns or amount of ammunition that a shotgun certificate holder can acquire or possess at one time, although each shotgun must be recorded on the certificates. Cartridges obtained using a shotgun certificate must have at least five projectiles each with a maximum size of 0.36 in (9.1 mm). Other types of shotgun ammunition such as solid slugs can only be bought following the grant of a firearm certificate.

Shotguns with a detachable magazine or larger fixed magazine are considered firearms and require a firearm certificate (24-inch (61 cm) barrel length rule and 40-inch (100 cm) fixed overall length) or break action shotguns with a minimum 12-inch (30 cm) barrel and overall 24-inch (61 cm) fixed length.

=== Airguns ===
Airguns are firearms according to the definition of lethal-barreled weapon under section 57(1) of the Firearms Act 1968. However, in England and Wales, air pistols with a muzzle energy not exceeding 6 foot-pounds force (8.1 joules) and other airguns with muzzle energy not exceeding 12 ft⋅lbf (16 J) are exempt from the requirement to possess a firearm certificate and may be acquired, purchased and possessed by anyone who is not a prohibited person.

The Violent Crime Reduction Act 2006 controls online or mail-order sales of airguns by way of trade or business; transactions must be finalised face-to-face, although the contract of sale may take place at a distance. The airgun may be sent by the seller to a registered firearms dealer (who will act as the seller's agent in the sale) from whom the gun may be collected by the purchaser. The same Act introduced the requirement that a person selling airguns or ammunition for airguns by way of trade or business be a registered firearms dealer. It is not an offence for a private individual to sell an airgun to another person as long as both parties are not legally barred from possessing airguns and the transaction does not constitute a business activity.

In 2006 it became a crime to fire an air weapon beyond the boundary of any premises without the occupier's permission, and increased the lower age limit for buying or possessing an air weapon to 18 years. From 10 February 2011 section 46 of the Crime and Security Act 2010 made it an offence "for a person in possession of an air weapon to fail to take reasonable precautions to prevent any person under the age of eighteen from having the weapon with him".

The Commission on Scottish Devolution when implemented gave the Scottish Parliament powers to regulate air guns. On 14 December 2012, a consultation was launched to investigate proposals for licensing air weapons in Scotland. The Scottish Cabinet Secretary for Justice foreword in the consultation paper (titled Proposals for Licensing Air Weapons in Scotland) stated that the Scottish government "[does] not intend to ban air weapons outright, but [does] not think that it is appropriate in our modern Scotland that there can be up to half a million unregistered, uncontrolled and often forgotten firearms in circulation". It stated an aim to "ensure that only those people with a legitimate reason for owning and using an airgun should have access to them in the future, and that they are properly licensed and accounted for". In 2011/12 there were 195 offences involving air weapons in Scotland, compared to 3,554 in England and Wales. The consultation closed in March 2013 with 1,101 responses, 87% of which were opposed to the principle of licensing air weapons.

As of 31 December 2016, it is a requirement to hold an airgun certificate in Scotland to possess an air rifle with muzzle energy less than 12 ft⋅lb (16 J) or air pistol with muzzle energy less than 6 ft⋅lb (8.1 J). There are some exceptions for current FAC and SGC holders in that they may hold an air rifle on their current certificate and apply to add it/them when next renewing their FAC or SGC.

=== Ammunition ===
Explosive, incendiary, noxious (biological, chemical), and armour-piercing ammunition types are prohibited for civilians. Section 9 of the Firearms (Amendment) Act 1997 generally prohibited expanding ammunition, but this conflicted with the Deer Act 1991 (which mandated its use for deer stalking). An exemption permitted the acquisition and possession of expanding ammunition on firearm certificates held for game shooting or deer-stalking but not target shooting. Section 219 of the Policing and Crime Act 2017 modified the 1997 act to only apply to pistol ammunition. The distinction is no longer made for rifles and expanding ammunition may be used for target shooting. The quantity of ammunition a certificate holder may possess is determined by certificate conditions on a per-calibre basis.

Shotgun cartridges are not restricted by certificate conditions and a shotgun certificate holder may acquire and possess as many as they like. Due to their bulky nature, normal shotgun cartridges are not subject to the same secure storage requirements as section 1 ammunition. Solid slugs or cartridges containing fewer than five projectiles are considered section 1 and must be held on a firearm certificate.

=== Sound moderators ===
Sound moderators were included in the definition of firearms under section 57(1)(d) of the Firearms Act 1968 until 2026 and were subject to control and require a firearm certificate with appropriate authority to acquire or possess.

On 21 February 2024 the Home Office launched a public consultation on proposals to remove moderators from licensing controls. The stated rationale was that moderators did not pose a risk to public safety, and that removing them from licensing controls would ease the administrative burden on the police and certificate holders, removing the need for certificate holders to apply for a variation to acquire or possess a moderator.

The consultation ran until 2 April 2024, and on 17 June 2025 the Home Office announced that moderators would be removed from licensing controls. This came into effect on 29th June 2026.

== Northern Ireland ==
Firearms (Northern Ireland) Order 2004 (Note: Section 1(1).)
- Statutory Instrument
- Parliament of the United Kingdom
- Citation: SI 2004/702
- Territorial extent: Northern Ireland

Dates
- Made: 10 March 2004
- Commencement: various (Note: Section 1(2)–(3).)
Other legislation
Amends	Customs and Excise Management Act 1979; Criminal Justice Act 1988; Terrorism Act 2000
Made under	Northern Ireland Act 2000

Status: Amended

Text of statute as originally enacted

Text of the Firearms (Northern Ireland) Order 2004 as in force today (including any amendments) within the United Kingdom, from legislation.gov.uk.

Gun control laws in Northern Ireland are less restrictive in some areas than gun laws in Great Britain due to the Good Friday Agreement, allowing Northern Ireland to govern itself and pass less restrictive laws. Gun law in Northern Ireland consists primarily of the Firearms (Northern Ireland) Order 2004 (SI 2004/702). Any firearm that has a muzzle energy exceeding 1 joule (0.74 ft⋅lbf) must be listed on a firearms certificate. Northern Ireland has one firearms certificate and all firearms are listed on that certificate irrespective of type.

All firearms owners in Northern Ireland are required to apply for a firearm certificate to possess firearms. Permits are issued to anyone who has good reason to possess firearms, such as target shooting and hunting. All firearms certificate holders are required to demonstrate they can be entrusted with a firearm. It is recommended that firearms dealers selling firearms are to instruct new buyers, and those changing/acquiring another firearm, about the safety procedures for that firearm. Firearms certificate holders are limited to the number of rounds of each calibre of ammunition listed on their certificate to 1,000 per listed calibre. This is a standard allowance given to every certificate holder. If a certificate holder requires a larger allowance, they must request that increase from PSNI Firearms Branch.

There is currently no limit on magazine capacity for rifles or handguns. Shotguns are limited to a magazine capacity of two cartridges for field use. The shotgun capacity can be increased, upon application to the PSNI firearms branch, for target shooting use.

A firearm certificate for a personal protection weapon will only be authorised where the Police Service of Northern Ireland deems there is a "verifiable specific risk" to the life of an individual and that the possession of a firearm is a reasonable, proportionate and necessary measure to protect their life. Permits for personal protection also allow the holder to carry their firearms concealed. Northern Ireland is the only part of the United Kingdom where personal protection is accepted as a legitimate reason to obtain and own a firearm.

=== Definitions ===
Section 2 of the Firearms (Northern Ireland) Order 2004 defines a firearm as:

- A lethal-barrelled weapon of any description from which a shot, bullet or other missile can be discharged
- A prohibited weapon
- An accessory to a weapon designed or adapted to diminish the noise or flash caused by firing the weapon
- Any component part, namely:
  - Any barrel, chamber or cylinder
  - Any frame, body or receiver
  - Any breech block, bolt or other mechanism for containing the pressure of discharge at the rear of a chamber
  - Any part of a firearm which directly bears the pressure caused by firing
  - Any magazine

The definition is similar to that used in Great Britain except for the inclusion of magazines and sound moderators, both of which are controlled in Northern Ireland. As of 2021, all magazines are required to be listed on firearm certificates. This measure is PSNI Firearms Branch policy in line with EU Directive 2021/555 on control of the acquisition and possession of weapons. PSNI Firearms Branch are to clarify exactly how this will take place.

=== Prohibited weapons ===
The following weapons are subject to general prohibition under section 45 of the Firearms (Northern Ireland) Order 2004:

- Automatic or burst-fire firearms
- Semi-automatic or pump-action rifles other than those chambered for .22 rimfire cartridges
- Semi-automatic or pump-action smoothbore firearms, except for air guns or those chambered for .22 rimfire cartridges, with a barrel of less than 60.96 cm (24.00 in) in length or an overall length of less than 102 cm (40 in)
- Any rifle with a chamber from which empty cartridge cases are extracted using either energy from propellant gas, or energy imparted to a spring or other energy storage device by propellant gas, other than a rifle chambered for .22 rimfire cartridges
- Smoothbore revolver firearms except for muzzle-loaders and those chambered for 9mm rimfire cartridges
- Air guns designed for use with self-contained gas cartridges
- Firearms disguised as another object
- Rocket launchers and mortars
- Any weapon of whatever description designed or adapted for the discharge of electricity or any noxious liquid, gas or other substance

Unlike in Great Britain, handguns are not prohibited, and the prohibition on semi-automatic and pump-action centrefire firearms applies only to rifles.

=== Reciprocity ===
Firearm certificates issued in Northern Ireland are valid in Great Britain. However, due to the prohibition of handguns in Great Britain, Northern Ireland certificate holders require special permission from the Home Office or Scottish Ministers to possess a handgun in Great Britain.

Since May 2016, firearm and shotgun certificates issued in Great Britain are also valid in Northern Ireland. However, airguns with a muzzle energy greater than 1 joule (0.74 ft⋅lbf) but less than 16.27 joules (12.00 ft⋅lbf), which are not subject to licensing in England and Wales, require a certificate of approval issued by the PSNI to transport to Northern Ireland.

== Statistics ==
As of 31 March 2026 there were:

- In England and Wales, 140,257 firearm certificates on issue (covering 623,567 firearms) and 457,340 shotgun certificates on issue (covering 1,300,223 shotguns). There were 470,785 certificate holders in total (those holding a firearm certificate, shotgun certificate or both).
- In Scotland, 24,656 firearm certificates on issue (covering 112,478 firearms) and 41,877 shotgun certificates on issue (covering 130,657 shotguns). There were 41,453 certificate holders in total. Additionally, there were 32,045 air weapon certificates on issue.
- In Northern Ireland, 52,452 firearm certificates on issue (covering 172,585 firearms).

== History ==
=== Early history ===
Archery Act 1511
- Act of Parliament
- Parliament of England
- Long title: An Act concerning shooting in Long Bows.
- Citation: 3 Hen. 8. c. 3
- Territorial extent: England and Wales

Dates
- Royal assent: 30 March 1512
- Commencement: 4 February 1512 (Note: Start of session.)
- Repealed: 28 July 1863
Other legislation
Amended by	Archery Act 1514; Unlawful Games Act 1541; Repeal of Acts Concerning Importation Act 1822
Repealed by	Statute Law Revision Act 1863
Relates to	Cross-bows, etc. Act 1514; Cross-bows Act 1523; Cross-bows Act 1533; Hail-shot Act 1548; Criminal Statutes Repeal Act 1827

Status: Repealed

Text of statute as originally enacted

The concept of legislating the use and ownership of weapons goes back at least as far as 1285 (13 Edw. 1) when the teaching or practice of fencing with a buckler was banned in the City of London. In 1305 the Statute of Arms stipulated the weapons that could be carried or used at a tournament of knights. This stated that not even a knight could bring a pointed sword, and his attendants were not permitted to wear or have a dagger. Throwing spears was banned in 1383 (7 Ric. 2. c. 13), and in 1388 servants, apprentices, and labourers were banned from wearing a sword in public except in time of war (12 Ric. 2. c. 6). The Archery Act 1511 (3 Hen. 8. c. 3) banned foreigners from having or using a longbow in England, and also banned them from taking bows or arrows out of the country.

Cross-bows, etc. Act 1514
- Act of Parliament
- Parliament of England
- Long title: An Act avoiding shooting in Cross Bows.
- Citation: 6 Hen. 8. c. 13
- Territorial extent: England and Wales

Dates
- Royal assent: 31 March 1515
- Commencement: 5 February 1515
- Repealed: 28 July 1863
Other legislation
Amended by	Cross-bows Act 1533; Cross-bows Act 1541
Repealed by	Statute Law Revision Act 1863
Relates to	Archery Act 1511; Cross-bows Act 1523; Hail-shot Act 1548

Status: Repealed

Text of statute as originally enacted

Cross-bows Act 1523
- Act of Parliament
- Parliament of England
- Long title: The Act for shooting in Cross Bows and Hand Guns.
- Citation: 14 & 15 Hen. 8. c. 7
- Territorial extent: England and Wales

Dates
- Royal assent: 13 August 1523
- Commencement: 15 April 1523
- Repealed: 28 July 1863
Other legislation
Amended by	Cross-bows Act 1533
Repealed by	Statute Law Revision Act 1863
Relates to	Archery Act 1511; Cross-bows, etc. Act 1514

Status: Repealed

Text of statute as originally enacted

Cross-bows Act 1533
- Act of Parliament
- Parliament of England
- Long title: An Act for shooting in Cross Bows and Hand Guns.
- Citation: 25 Hen. 8. c. 17
- Territorial extent: England and Wales

Dates
- Royal assent: 30 March 1534
- Commencement: 15 January 1534
- Repealed: 16 January 1542
Other legislation
Amends	Cross-bows, etc. Act 1514; Cross-bows Act 1523
Repealed by	Cross-bows Act 1541
Relates to	Archery Act 1511

Status: Repealed

Text of statute as originally enacted

The first legislation to specifically mention firearms was the Cross-bows, etc. Act 1514 (6 Hen. 8. c. 13), which prohibited the use of hand guns by anyone who did not own land with an income of at least forty marks per year. The same rule also applied to crossbows. There was an exception for those who lived on a ship, or within seven miles of the sea, or "upon any of the English Marches foranenst Scotland", when a gun or crossbow was permitted to defend one's home or town. The land value threshold was amended to £100 by the Cross-bows Act 1523 (14 & 15 Hen. 8. c. 7), and these rules were repeated in the Cross-bows Act 1533 (25 Hen. 8. c. 17). The provision that persons living within twelve miles of the border between England and Scotland were permitted to use crossbows and demyhake for the defence of their homes was repealed by the Union of England and Scotland Act 1606 (4 Jas. 1. c. 1). In 1534, as a result of dissent within Wales to King Henry VIII proclaiming himself head of the Church of England, it was made illegal by the Marches in Wales Act 1534 (26 Hen. 8. c. 6) for any Welsh man or anyone in Wales to take a weapon of any sort, "any bill, longebowe, crosbowe, handgon, swerde, staffe, daggare, halberde, morespike, speare, or any other maner of weapon", to any public assembly, fair, market, church, or meeting, or within two miles of any court.

Cross-bows Act 1541
- Act of Parliament
- Parliament of England
- Long title: An Act concerning Cross-bows and Hand-guns.
- Citation: 33 Hen. 8. c. 6
- Territorial extent: England and Wales; Isle of Man

Dates
- Royal assent: 1 April 1542
- Commencement: 16 January 1542
- Repealed: England and Wales: 1 November 1831; Isle of Man: 25 July 1991
Other legislation
Amends	Cross-bows, etc. Act 1514; Cross-bows Act 1523
Repeals/revokes	Cross-bows Act 1533
Repealed by	England and Wales: Game Act 1831; Isle of Man: Statute Law Revision (Isle of Man) Act 1991
Relates to	Archery Act 1511; Hail-shot Act 1548

Status: Repealed

Text of statute as originally enacted

Hail-shot Act 1548
- Act of Parliament
- Parliament of England
- Long title: An Act against shooting of Hail-shot.
- Citation: 2 & 3 Edw. 6. c. 14
- Territorial extent: England and Wales

Dates
- Royal assent: 14 March 1549
- Commencement: 24 November 1548
- Repealed: 7 November 1693
Other legislation
Repealed by	Militia, etc. Act 1694
Relates to	Archery Act 151; Cross-bows Act 1541

Status: Repealed

Text of statute as originally enacted

By 1541 the increased variety of handheld firearms required new legislation and it was then made illegal to own any "handgun hagbutt or demy hake, or use or kepe in his or their houses or elsewhere any handgun hagbut or demy hake", except for those owning land worth more than £100. These weapons were required to be at least three feet long (91.4 cm), unless they were a "hagbutt or demyhake", when the minimum length was three-quarters of a yard (68 cm). In addition, under the Cross-bows Act 1541 (33 Hen. 8. c. 6) these weapons could be used only for firing at a bank of earth, a butt, or a mark, and not for shooting game. The Hail-shot Act 1548 (2 & 3 Edw. 6. c. 14) stipulated that no one less than a member of the House of Lords could fire a handgun within any town or city, that 'hayleshot', or any other form of shot that delivered more than one pellet at a time, was banned entirely. The prescribed penalty was a £10 fine and 3 months in prison. Anyone wishing to fire a handgun had to register with a justice of the peace first. The purpose of this was given as that the king might know where in the country armed men were to be found should he need them for any purpose. This is not yet gun licensing, but owner registration. In 1592, John Baseden of Tenterden, a miller, was fined under this statute.

The Hail-shot Act 1548 was repealed by the Militia, etc. Act 1694 (6 & 7 Will. & Mar. c. 13). The preamble in that act said that however useful the Hail-shot Act 1548 might have been when passed, it had now fallen into disuse; it needed repealing because a number of malicious prosecutions citing this act had been launched.

Military Service Act 1557
- Act of Parliament
- Parliament of England
- Long title: An Act for the having of Horse Armour and Weapons.
- Citation: 4 & 5 Phil. & Mar. c. 2
- Territorial extent: England and Wales

Dates
- Royal assent: 7 March 1558
- Commencement: 20 January 1558
- Repealed: 19 March 1604
Other legislation
Repealed by	Continuance of Laws, etc. Act 1603

Status: Repealed

Text of statute as originally enacted

The Military Service Act 1557 (4 & 5 Phil. & Mar. c. 2), passed when England was at war with both Scotland and France, stipulated that everyone with property, including "anye Honoures Lordeshipes Manours Houses Landes Meadowes Pastires or Wooddes", over certain thresholds had to provide specific numbers of horses, armour and weapons, including hagbutts, "for the better furniture and defence of this Realme". Everyone worth more than £1,000 had to have six horses suitable for knights in armour, complete with saddle and harness, ten more horses for light cavalry, forty sets of armour, forty pikes, thirty longbows, thirty sheaves of arrows, thirty metal helmets, twenty halberds, twenty hagbutts, and twenty salets. Men with lesser amounts of property were required to provided fewer weapons, so that a man whose property was valued at £20 had to provide one set of armour, one longbow with one sheaf of arrows, one steel helmet, and one hagbutt. There is no mention of whether or not these men had to be registered, but anyone living in Wales was excused finding a hagbutt, and had to replace each weapon with a longbow and sheaf of arrows. Furthermore, these hagbutts were to be used only in accordance with the existing Cross-bows Act 1541 (33 Hen. 8. c. 6) and could not be carried on the public highway unless going to or from a muster or to war.

=== 1600–1714 ===
In 1603, in response to the low number of prosecutions for illegal hunting, the Game Act 1603 (1 Jas. 1. c. 27) (Note: This is the citation in The Statutes of the Realm) made it an offence for anyone to shoot, spoil or destroy with any gun, crossbow, stone bow or longbow any of a long list of game birds including pheasant, partridge, heron, mallard, teal, wigeon, and grouse, offenders to be sentenced to three months in the common gaol or pay a fine of twenty shillings for each bird. A specific exception was made that any person who kept hawks may shoot with a hand gun or "birding piece," crows, chough, rooks, doves, jays and other small birds for feeding hawks, but that shooting must not occur within six hundred paces of any heronry or one hundred paces of any pigeon house.

In 1660, on disbanding the army after the Civil War and the restoration of the monarchy, the Disbanding of the Army Act 1660 (12 Cha. 2. c. 15) stipulated that all horse and foot soldiers should "deliver up their Armes" except swords, and that no soldier shall, "ride or travell with any fire armes upon paine of losing his said Armes and of imprisonment dureing his Majestyes pleasure."

The Militia Act 1662 (14 Cha. 2. c. 3), entitled An Act for ordering the Forces in the several Counties of this Kingdom, passed shortly after the Restoration, enabled and authorised, by warrant, local government personnel to search for and seize all arms in the custody or possession of any person or persons whom the government judged dangerous to the peace of the kingdom. It prohibited the search of rural houses during the night hours. It made it lawful in case of resistance to enter by force. Furthermore, it allowed for the restoration of seized arms.

Additionally, the act authorised recruitment into the militia of men with an income of £100 per year or more. Foot soldiers in the militia were authorised to be armed with a musket "the Barrell whereof is not to be under three Foot (91 cm) in length and the Gage of the Bore to be for twelve Bulletts to the pound," and they should bring with them to each muster half a pound (225 g) of gunpowder. Horse soldiers were authorised to be armed with "a Sword and a case of Pistolls the Barrells whereof are not to be under fourteen inches (35 cm) in length," and should bring with them a quarter pound (115 g) of powder.

The Better Ordering the Forces Act 1663 (15 Cha. 2. c. 4) ordered that each musketeer should bring with him to each muster, exercise, or training, half a pound (225 g) of powder and half a pound of bullets, that each musketeer with a matchlock should bring three yards (2.75 m) of match, and that every horseman should bring a quarter pound (115 g) of powder and a quarter pound of bullets. The act also clarified that these items were to be paid for by the Lieutenant of the County, who was personally responsible for raising, mustering, and exercising the troops who could not be required to undergo more than fourteen days training per year.

The Game Act 1670 (22 & 23 Cha. 2. c. 25) stipulated that ownership of a gun or a bow (and ownership of certain other poaching apparatus and equipment including lowbells, harepipes, and snares) was restricted to those with land or tenements in their own or their wife's name that brought in an income of £100 per year or more, or with a lease of ninety-nine years or more on land with an income of £150 or more. The act also authorised gamekeepers registered with the justice of the peace to obtain a warrant to search the property of anyone not authorised by the act to keep a gun, for anything restricted by the act and to seize and destroy the same.

The Billeting Act 1679 (31 Cha. 2. c. 1) disbanded the army, with soldiers required to return their arms and ammunition. Foot soldiers were directed to march away with their clothes, sword, belt and knapsack only, while horse soldiers were additionally entitled to their horse, saddle and bridle, while, "all other Armes shall be then delivered up as is before directed."

Importing, etc., of Gunpowder, etc. Act 1685
- Act of Parliament
- Parliament of the United Kingdom
- Long title: An Act against the Importation of Gun-powder Arms and other Ammunition and Utensils of Warr.
- Citation: 1 Ja. 2. c. 8
- Territorial extent: England and Wales

Dates
- Royal assent: 27 June 1685
- Commencement: 10 July 1685 (Note: Section 2.)
- Repealed: 28 July 1863
Other legislation
Amended by	Importation (No. 5) Act 1806
Repealed by	Statute Law Revision Act 1863

Status: Repealed

Text of statute as originally enacted

The Importing, etc., of Gunpowder, etc. Act 1685 (1 Ja. 2. c. 8) made it an offence to import guns, ammunition, gunpowder or "Utensills of Warr" without a licence. It was also an offence to obtain such a licence and sell the imported merchandise to anyone other than the "Publique Stores of his Majestie."

The Papists (No. 2) Act 1688 (1 Will. & Mar. c. 15) made it an offence for a Roman Catholic to own, possess, hold or use any arms, weapons, ammunition or gunpowder. A catholic was defined as anyone who refused to take an oath declaring that transubstantiation did not happen at the eucharist. The act also authorised any two or more justices of the peace to issue warrants for the constable, the tythingman, or their deputy, to search the property of any person refusing to take the oath, and seize any arms, weapons, gunpowder or ammunition in their possession or custody, and deliver them to the lieutenant of the county for the use of the militia. It was also an offence to hinder the search, to conceal items from the searchers, or to fail to reveal items not discovered when searched for, all of which were punishable by three months in the county gaol.

Following the Glorious Revolution, the Bill of Rights 1689 clarified that ownership of firearms remained as it had originally been defined in the Cross-bows Act 1523, as restated in the Cross-bows Act 1541, the Militia Act 1662, and the Game Act 1670, that ownership and possession of firearms was restricted to those who owned land worth £100 or more. But that in accordance with the Papists (No. 2) Act 1688, this only applied to Protestants. No Catholic was permitted to own, hold or use firearms, ammunition, or gunpowder.

The rights of English subjects and, after 1707, British subjects, to possess arms was recognised under English common law. Sir William Blackstone's Commentaries on the Laws of England, were highly influential and were used as a reference and text book for English common law. In his Commentaries, Blackstone described the right to arms:

The fifth and last auxiliary right of the subject, that I shall at present mention, is that of having arms for their defence, suitable to their condition and degree, and such as are allowed by law. Which is also declared by the same statute I W. & M. st.2. c.2. and is indeed a public allowance, under due restrictions, of the natural right of resistance and self-preservation, when the sanctions of society and laws are found insufficient to restrain the violence of oppression.

Formerly, this same British common law applied to the UK and Australia, and until 1783 to the colonies in North America that became the United States. The right to keep and bear arms had originated in England during the reign of Henry II with the 1181 Assize of Arms, and developed as part of common law.

=== 1715–1899 ===
After the Jacobite rebellions of 1715 and 1745, harsh laws providing, amongst other things, for disarming the Highlands of Scotland were enacted by the Parliament of Great Britain: the Disarming Acts of 1716 and 1725 and the Act of Proscription 1746. Some high-profile assassination attempts using firearms occurred in the 19th century, such as the assassination of Prime Minister Spencer Perceval in 1812 and Edward Oxford's attack on Queen Victoria in 1840, but those events led to changes in treason legislation (Treason Act 1840) rather than firearm controls.

The first British firearm controls were introduced as part of the Vagrancy Act 1824 (5 Geo. 4 c. 83), which was set up in a reaction against the large number of people roaming the country with weapons brought back from the Napoleonic Wars. It allowed the police to arrest "any person with any gun, pistol, hanger [a light sword], cutlass, bludgeon or other offensive weapon ... with intent to commit a felonious act". It was followed by the Night Poaching Acts 1828 and 1844, the Game Act 1831 (1 & 2 Will. 4 c. 32), and the Poaching Prevention Act 1862 (25 & 26 Vict. c. 114), which made it an offence to shoot game illegally by using a firearm.

Gun Licence Act 1870 (Note: Section 1.)
- Act of Parliament
- Parliament of the United Kingdom
- Long title: An Act to grant a Duty of Excise on Licences to use Guns.
- Citation: 33 & 34 Vict. c. 57
- Territorial extent: United Kingdom (Note: Section 3.)

Dates
- Royal assent: 9 August 1870
- Commencement: 1 April 1871
- Repealed: England and Wales: 13 December 1966; Scotland: 21 December 1966
Other legislation
Amended by	Customs and Excise Act 1952
Repealed by	England and Wales: Local Government Act 1966; Scotland: Local Government (Scotland) Act 1966
Relates to	Game Act 1831; Game (Scotland) Act 1832

Status: Repealed

Text of statute as originally enacted

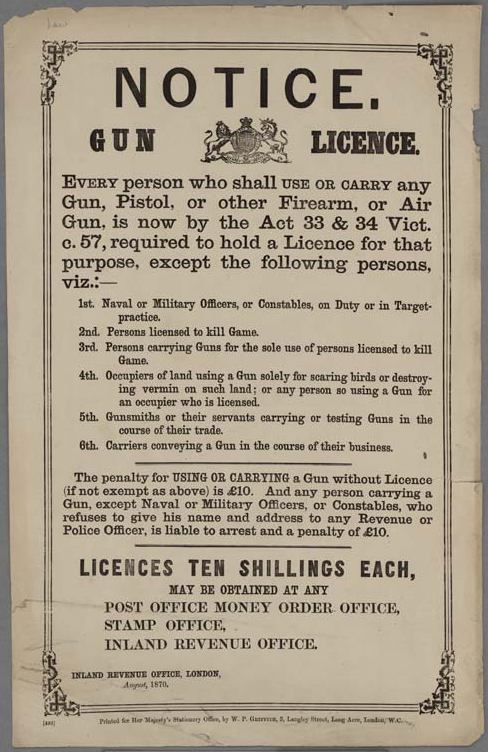
Gun licence notice from 1870

The Gun Licence Act 1870 (33 & 34 Vict. c. 57) was created to raise revenue. It required a person to obtain a licence to carry a gun outside his own property for any reason. A licence was not required to buy a gun. The licences cost 10 shillings (equivalent to £51 in 2025), lasted one year and could be bought over the counter at post offices.

=== Pistols Act 1903 ===
Pistols Act 1903
- Act of Parliament
- Parliament of the United Kingdom
- Long title: An Act to regulate the sale and use of Pistols or other Firearms.
- Citation: 3 Edw. 7. c. 18
- Territorial extent: England and Wales; Scotland (Note: Section 9.)

Dates
- Royal assent: 11 August 1903
- Commencement: 11 August 1903 (Note: The Acts of Parliament (Commencement) Act 1793.)
- Repealed: 1 September 1920
Other legislation
Repealed by	Firearms Act 1920
Relates to	Gun Licence Act 1870

Status: Repealed

Text of statute as originally enacted

The Pistols Act 1903 (3 Edw. 7. c. 18) was the first to place restrictions on the sale of firearms. Titled "An Act to regulate the sale and use of Pistols or other Firearms", it was short, with just nine sections, and applied solely to pistols. It defined a pistol as a firearm whose barrel did not exceed 9 in (230 mm) in length and made it illegal to sell or rent a pistol to anyone who could not produce a current gun licence or game licence, unless they were exempt from the Gun Licence Act 1870, could prove that they planned to use the pistol on their own property, or had a statement signed by a police officer of inspector rank or above or a justice of the peace to the effect that they were about to go abroad for six months or more. The act was more or less ineffective, as anyone wishing to buy a pistol commercially merely had to purchase a licence on demand over the counter from a Post Office before doing so. In addition, it did not regulate private sales of such firearms.

The legislators laid some emphasis on the dangers of pistols in the hands of children and drunkards and made specific provisions regarding sales to these two groups: persons under 18 could be fined 40 shillings (£2, equivalent to £210 in 2025) if they bought, hired, or carried a pistol, while anyone who sold a pistol to such a person could be fined £5. Anyone who sold a pistol to someone who was "intoxicated or of unsound mind" was liable to a fine of £25 (equivalent to £2,600 in 2025) or three months' imprisonment with hard labour. However, it was not an offence under the act to give or lend a pistol to anyone belonging to the two groups.

=== Firearms Act 1920 ===
Firearms Act 1920 (Note: Section 19(1).)
- Act of Parliament
- Parliament of the United Kingdom
- Long title: An Act to amend the Law relating to Firearms and other Weapons and Ammunition, and to amend the Unlawful Drilling Act, 1819.
- Citation: 10 & 11 Geo. 5. c. 43
- Territorial extent: England and Wales; Scotland (Note: Section 17.); Ireland (Note: Section 18.)

Dates
- Royal assent: 16 August 1920
- Commencement: 1 September 1920 (Note: Section 19(3).)
- Repealed: 8 November 1995
Other legislation
Amends	Unlawful Drilling Act 1819
Repeals/revokes	Pistols Act 1903
Amended by	Firearms Act 1934; Firearms (Amendment) Act 1936; Firearms Act 1937
Repealed by	Statute Law (Repeals) Act 1995
Relates to	Gun Barrel Proof Act 1868; Gun Licence Act 1870; Pawnbrokers Act 1872; Explosive Substances Act 1883; Police Act 1890; Firearms and Imitation Firearms (Criminal Use) Act 1933

Status: Repealed

Text of statute as originally enacted

Revised text of statute as amended

The Firearms Act 1920 (10 & 11 Geo. 5. c. 43) was partly spurred by fears of a possible surge in crime from the large number of firearms available following World War I and also fears of working-class unrest in this period. "An Act to amend the law relating to firearms and other weapons and ammunition", its main stated aim was to enable the government to control the overseas arms trade and so fulfil its commitment to the 1919 Paris Arms Convention. The ongoing Anglo-Irish War may also have been a factor, as Britain and Ireland were at that time still in union with each other, and the act also applied to Ireland. It required anyone wanting to purchase or possess a firearm or ammunition to obtain a firearm certificate. The certificate, which lasted for three years, specified not only the firearm but also the amount of ammunition the holder could buy or possess. Local chief constables decided who could obtain a certificate and had the power to exclude anyone of "intemperate habits" or "unsound mind", or anyone considered "for any reason unfitted to be trusted with firearms". Applicants for certificates also had to convince the police that they had a good reason for needing a certificate. The law did not affect smooth-bore guns, which were available for purchase without any form of paperwork. The penalty for violating the act was a fine of up to £50 (equivalent to £equivalent to £1,900 in 2025) or "imprisonment with or without hard labour for a term not exceeding three months", or both.

The right of individuals to bear arms had previously been, in the words of the 1689 Bill of Rights, "as allowed by law". The Firearms Act 1920 made this right conditional upon the Home Secretary and the police. A series of classified Home Office directives defined for the benefit of chief constables what constituted good reason to grant a certificate. They originally included self-defence.

Firearms and Imitation Firearms (Criminal Use) Act 1933 (Note: Section 5(1).)
- Act of Parliament
- Parliament of the United Kingdom
- Long title: An Act to impose penalties for the use, attempted use and possession of firearms and imitation firearms in certain cases, to amend certain provisions of the Larceny Act, 1916, relating to offensive weapons or instruments, and for purposes connected with the matters aforesaid.
- Citation: 23 & 24 Geo. 5. c. 50
- Territorial extent: England and Wales (Note: Section 5(3).)

Dates
- Royal assent: 17 November 1933
- Commencement: 17 November 1933
- Repealed: 1 May 1937
Other legislation
Amends	Larceny Act 1916
Amended by	Firearms (Amendment) Act 1936
Repealed by	Firearms Act 1937
Relates to	Vagrancy Act 1824; Malicious Damage Act 1861; Offences Against the Person Act 1861; Prevention of Crimes Act 1871; Penal Servitude Act 1891; Firearms Act 1920; Criminal Justice Act 1925; Road Traffic Act 1930

Status: Repealed

Text of statute as originally enacted

Firearms Act 1934 (Note: Section 2(1).)
- Act of Parliament
- Parliament of the United Kingdom
- Long title: An Act to amend the Firearms Act, 1920, as to the age of persons who may purchase firearms or to whom firearms may be sold; and to alter the definition of firearms in the said Act.
- Citation: 24 & 25 Geo. 5. c. 16
- Territorial extent: England and Wales; Scotland; (Note: Section 2(2).)

Dates
- Royal assent: 17 May 1934
- Commencement: 17 May 1934
- Repealed: 1 May 1937
Other legislation
Amends	Firearms Act 1920
Amended by	Firearms (Amendment) Act 1936
Repealed by	Firearms Act 1937
Relates to	Firearms (Amendment) Act 1936

Status: Repealed

Text of statute as originally enacted

Firearms (Amendment) Act 1936 (Note: Section 16(1).)
- Act of Parliament
- Parliament of the United Kingdom
- Long title: An Act to amend the Firearms Act, 1920, and the Firearms Act, 1934, and in connection therewith to amend subsection (2) of section five of the Firearms and Imitation Firearms (Criminal Use) Act, 1933.
- Citation: 26 Geo. 5 & 1 Edw. 8. c. 39
- Territorial extent: United Kingdom

Dates
- Royal assent: 31 July 1936
- Commencement: 1 May 1937 (Note: Section 16(4).)
- Repealed: England and Wales and Scotland: 1 May 1937; Northern Ireland:
Other legislation
Amends	Firearms Act 1920; Firearms Act 1934; Firearms and Imitation Firearms (Criminal Use) Act 1933
Amended by	Statute Law Revision Act 1953
Repealed by	England and Wales and Scotland: Firearms Act 1937; Northern Ireland: Firearms Act (Northern Ireland) 1969
Relates to	Firearms Act 1934

Status: Repealed

Text of statute as originally enacted

As the Firearms Act 1920 did not prevent criminals from obtaining firearms illegally, the Firearms and Imitation Firearms (Criminal Use) Act 1933 (23 & 24 Geo. 5. c. 50) was passed by Parliament. It increased the punishment for the use of a gun in the commission of a crime and made it an offence punishable by up to 14 years' imprisonment for anyone to "attempt to make use" of any firearm or imitation firearm to resist arrest. Possession of a real or imitation firearm was also made an offence unless the possessor could show he had it for "a lawful object".

=== Firearms Act 1937 ===
The Firearms Act 1937 (1 Edw. 8 & 1 Geo. 6 c. 12) incorporated various modifications to the Firearms Act 1920 based on the recommendations of a 1934 committee chaired by Sir Archibald Bodkin. The resulting legislation raised the minimum age for buying a firearm or airgun from 14 to 17, extended controls to shotguns and other smooth-bore weapons with barrels shorter than 20 in (510 mm) (later raised by the Firearms Act 1968 to 24 in (610 mm)), transferred certificates for machine guns to military oversight, regulated gun dealers, and granted chief constables the power to add conditions to individual firearms certificates.

In the same year, the Home Secretary declared that self-defence was no longer a suitable reason for applying for a firearm certificate and directed police to refuse such applications on the grounds that "firearms cannot be regarded as a suitable means of protection and may be a source of danger".

=== Firearms Act 1968 ===
The Firearms Act 1968 (c. 27) brought together all existing firearms legislation in a single statute. Disregarding minor changes, it formed the legal basis for British firearms control policy until the Firearms (Amendment) Act 1988 (c. 45) was put through Parliament in the aftermath of the 1987 Hungerford massacre. For the first time, it introduced controls for long-barrelled shotguns, in the form of shotgun certificates that, like firearm certificates, were issued by an area's chief constable in England, Scotland, and Wales. While applicants for firearms certificates had to show a good reason for possessing the firearm or ammunition, it did not apply to shotgun certificates. Firearms and ammunition had to be kept locked up in a secure place approved by the local police firearms officer.

The act also prohibited the possession of firearms or ammunition by criminals who had been sentenced to imprisonment; those sentenced to three months to three years imprisonment were banned from possessing firearms or ammunition for five years, while those sentenced to longer terms were banned for life. However, an application could be made to have the prohibition removed.

The act was accompanied by an amnesty; many older weapons were handed in to the police. It has remained a feature of British policing that from time to time a brief firearms amnesty is declared.

=== Firearms (Amendment) Act 1988 ===
In the aftermath of the Hungerford massacre, Parliament passed the Firearms (Amendment) Act 1988 (c. 45). This confined semi-automatic and pump-action centre-fire rifles, military weapons firing explosive ammunition, short shotguns that had magazines, and elevated both pump-action and self-loading rifles to the Prohibited category. Registration and secure storage of shotguns held on shotgun certificates became required, and shotguns with more than a 2+1 capacity came to need a firearm certificate. The law also introduced new restrictions on shotguns. Rifles in .22 rimfire and semi-automatic pistols were unaffected.

=== Firearms (Amendment) Acts 1997 ===
Following the Dunblane massacre, Parliament passed the Firearms (Amendment) Act 1997 (c. 5) and the Firearms (Amendment) (No. 2) Act 1997 (c. 64), defining "short firearms" as Section 5 prohibited weapons, which effectively banned private possession of handguns almost completely in Great Britain. Exceptions to the ban include muzzle-loading guns, pistols of historic interest (such as pistols used in notable crimes, rare prototypes, unusual serial numbers, guns forming part of a collection), guns used for starting sporting events, signal pistols, pistols that are of particular aesthetic interest (such as engraved or jewelled guns), and shot pistols for pest control. Even the UK's Olympic shooters fell under this ban; shooters could only train in Northern Ireland (where the ban did not apply), or outside of the UK, be that in the Crown Dependencies (made up of the Channel Islands and Isle of Man), or in foreign nations (in Switzerland, in practice). Prior to the 2012 London Olympics, British Shooting negotiated an agreement with the Home Office to issue Section 5 permits to a limited number of nominated elite athletes, allowing them to keep pistols and train on the UK mainland at nominated "Section 5 Ranges". This agreement was renewed following the Olympics and Section 5 permits remain on issue for eligible members of the GB squad.

162,000 pistols and 700 long tons (710 t) of ammunition and related equipment were handed in by an estimated 57,000 people – 0.1% of the population, or one in every 960 persons. At the time, the renewal cycle for FACs was five years, meaning that it would take six years for the full reduction of valid certificates for both large-calibre and .22 handguns bans (because certificates remained valid even if the holder had disposed of all their firearms). On 31 December 1996, prior to the large-calibre handgun ban, there were 133,600 FACs on issue in England and Wales; by 31 December 1997 it had fallen to 131,900. On 31 December 2001, five years after the large calibre ban, the number had fallen to 119,600 and 117,700 the following year. This represents a net drop of 24,200 certificates. Comparable figures for Scotland show a net drop of 5,841 from 32,053 to 26,212 certificates, making a GB total net drop of 30,041. However, while the number of certificates in England and Wales rose each year after 2002 to stand at 126,400 at 31 March 2005 (due to a change in reporting period), those in Scotland remained relatively static, standing at 26,538 at 31 December 2005.

=== Violent Crime Reduction Act 2006 ===
The Violent Crime Reduction Act 2006 (c. 38) mainly impacted upon firearms legislation by creating minimum sentences for some firearms offences, regulating the sale of primers and provisions relating to imitation firearms. From 6 April 2007 the sale and transfer of new "air weapons" by mail order ("by way of trade or business") became an offence (they may still be purchased in person), as well as the sale of primers, and realistic imitation firearms (RIFs). The only exceptions are for the purposes of military and historical reenactment, media and theatre production, paintballing, and Airsoft as a sport. This has affected Airsoft in the UK by restricting the sale, import and purchase of airsoft replicas to individuals entitled to a specific defence, e.g. members of an organised airsoft site holding permitted activities with third-party liability insurance cover or re-enactors.

=== Offensive Weapons Act 2019 ===
At the bill stage, the Offensive Weapons Act 2019 (c. 17) proposed to amend Section 5 (Prohibited Weapons) of the 1968 act with three new classes:

- Bump stocks
- "Rapid firing" MARS and lever-release rifles (not to be confused with lever action rifles, which remain legal)
- "High muzzle energy" firearms generating more than 10,000 ft⋅lbf (13,600 J) muzzle energy

The prohibition on bump stocks was a reaction to the 2017 Las Vegas shooting. This had no effect on the UK legal market as most semi-automatic firearms are already prohibited and bump stocks were not commonly available. It was intended to prevent the import of such items for use with illicit firearms.

The second prohibition is for firearms which use the propellant gas to operate a mechanism for extracting the spent casing. This encompasses gas-operated firearms which were already banned as semi-automatic or automatic, but also includes those that lock the action before reloading, to be released manually. The mechanism of most weapons affected by this ban was either MARS (Manually-Activated Release System, such as a vz. 58 modified by Caledonian Arms in Kilbirnie), where the action is released with a trigger pull (a second trigger pull being needed to fire the loaded cartridge); or lever release (such as weapons made by the Southern Gun Company in Bodmin), where the action is released by operating a lever separate from the trigger. These were moved to s. 5 due to a perception that they represented a "loophole" around the prohibition on semi-automatic rifles and could "fire rapidly". A scheme to compensate owners opened in December 2020, ahead of the prohibition coming into force in March 2021.

The final item for consideration was high muzzle energy firearms. This was intended to target rifles in .50 BMG calibre that are "capable of 10,000 foot pounds [13,600 J] of muzzle energy". However, this criterion would also apply to some British hunting calibres. This proposal never made the final act. There were several proposed amendments to include further restrictions on all firearms and the licensing of airguns in England and Wales, none of which were adopted. Air weapons and high muzzle energy firearms were also part of a public consultation in December 2020. The outcome of the consultation was published in July 2022.

== Gun crime ==
The United Kingdom has one of the lowest rates of gun homicides in the world and mass shootings are extremely rare. There were 0.05 recorded intentional homicides committed with a firearm per 100,000 inhabitants in the five years to 2011 (15 to 38 people per year). Gun homicides accounted for 2.4% of all homicides in the year 2011. Office for National Statistics figures show 7,866 offences in which firearms were involved in the year ending March 2015, 2% up on the previous year and the first increase in 10 years. Of these, 19 were fatalities, 10 fewer than the previous year and the lowest since records began in 1969.

It is important to recognize, though, that the overall homicide rate had grown steadily from the 1970s to the peak in 2003 (at 1.79 per 100,000 inhabitants), and as of 2026 never fell below the early 1970s numbers.

=== Spree killings and mass shootings ===
The United Kingdom has had few spree killings or mass shootings. The most well known are the Hungerford massacre of 1987, the Dunblane school massacre of 1996, and the Cumbria shootings of 2010. After Hungerford and Dunblane, firearms legislation was amended, tightening firearms restrictions in the United Kingdom. UK gun legislation has been described by The Huffington Post as "one of the toughest regimes in the world". After Hungerford, the Firearms (Amendment) Act 1988 criminalised most semi-automatic long-barrelled weapons; it was generally supported by the Labour opposition although some Labour backbenchers thought it inadequate. After Dunblane, the Firearms (Amendment) Act 1997 criminalised private possession of most handguns having a calibre over .22; the Snowdrop campaign continued to press for a wider ban, and in 1997 the incoming Labour government passed the Firearms (Amendment) (No. 2) Act 1997. This extended the ban to most handguns with a calibre of .22, excepting antique handguns and black-powder revolvers.

==== Hungerford massacre ====
On 19 August 1987, 27-year-old Michael Ryan, armed with two semi-automatic rifles (a Type 56 sporter and an M1 carbine) and a Beretta 92 pistol, dressed in combat fatigues and proceeded around the town of Hungerford killing 16 people, wounding 15 and shooting himself, in what became known as the Hungerford massacre. Ryan's collection of weapons had been legally licensed, according to the Hungerford Report.

==== Dunblane massacre ====
On 13 March 1996, Thomas Hamilton, a 43-year-old former Scout leader who had been ousted by The Scout Association in 1974, shot dead 16 young children and their teacher, Gweneth Mayor, in Dunblane Primary School's gymnasium with two Browning Hi-Power pistols and two Smith & Wesson Model 19 revolvers. He then shot himself. Personnel of the Police Firearms Licensing Office were not aware of Hamilton's expulsion from the Scout Association, nor were they aware of allegations made against him regarding unsavoury behaviour at boys' summer camps he had organised: allegations that would have exposed his poor character. The incident led to improvements in inter-departmental sharing of police intelligence and deeper background checks of firearm certificate applicants.

After the incident, in 1997, legislation was introduced to prohibit, with some extremely specialised exemptions, "small firearms" with a barrel length of less than 30 cm (12 in) or an overall length of less than 60 cm (24 in).

==== Cumbria shootings ====
On 2 June 2010, Derrick Bird, a 52-year-old taxi driver, shot and killed 12 people and injured 11 others while driving through Cumbria. He then shot himself. Bird was a licensed firearms holder; his weapons were a 12-gauge double-barrelled shotgun and CZ 452-2E ZKM .22-calibre bolt-action rifle.

==== Plymouth shootings ====
On 12 August 2021, 22-year-old Jake Davison, an apprentice crane operator and bodybuilding enthusiast, shot seven people, killing five including his own mother, around a residential area in the Keyham area of Plymouth in Devon. He then shot and killed himself. Davison's motives were related to his declining mental health and quality of life. Davison considered himself to be a part of the incel movement, blaming others for his issues and hardships and would regularly vent his frustrations online. Prior to carrying out the attack, Davison posted a video rant, saying how he was "beaten down".

Davison was armed with a legally held shotgun. An investigation into the events that transpired during this incident quickly revealed that Davison had previously lost his shotgun certificate after admitting to assaulting two youths at a park. He then had his firearm and firearm licence reinstated after participating in a Pathfinder programme. The coroner's inquest heard that firearms enquiry officers (FEO) at Devon and Cornwall Police had received no training for twenty years, and that a "dangerously unsafe culture" had prevailed within the Firearms Licensing Office, which was described as "a dangerous shambles". On 6 October 2021, the Independent Office for Police Conduct issued disciplinary notices to two members of Devon and Cornwall Police over their handling of Davison's shotgun certificate.

The incident prompted the Home Office to review how firearms certificates and shotgun certificates were issued. In June 2023, it was announced that a national training programme for FEOs would be introduced by 2024. Provision of appropriate role training had originally been recommended by the Cullen Inquiry into the 1996 Dunblane massacre, but had not been implemented by police or the Home Office.

== See also ==
- Firearms enquiry officer

== Bibliography ==
- Greenwood, Colin (1972). Firearms Control: A Study of Armed Crime and Firearms Control in England and Wales. Routledge. ISBN 0-7100-7435-2.
- Malcolm, Joyce Lee (2002). Guns and Violence: The English Experience. Harvard University Press. ISBN 0-674-01608-4.
- Utterley, Sandra (2006). Dunblane Unburied. BookPublishingWorld. ISBN 1905553056.
- Waldren, Michael J. (2007). Armed Police: The Police Use of Firearms Since 1945. England: Sutton Publishing. ISBN 978-0-7509-4637-7.
