= Firearms (Amendment) (No. 2) Act 1997 =

Act of the Parliament of the United Kingdom

Firearms (Amendment) (No. 2) Act 1997 (Note: Section 3(1).)
- Act of Parliament
- Parliament of the United Kingdom
- Long title: An Act to extend the class of prohibited weapons under the Firearms Act 1968 to include small-calibre pistols.
- Citation: 1997 c. 64
- Introduced by: Jack Straw (Commons)
- Territorial extent: England and Wales; Scotland; (Note: Section 3(5).)

Dates
- Royal assent: 27 November 1997
- Commencement: 17 December 1997 (in part); 1 February 1998 (whole act); (Note: Section 3(3)–(4). The Firearms (Amendment) (No. 2) Act 1997 (Commencement) Order 1997.)
Other legislation
| Relates to | Firearms Act 1968; Firearms (Amendment) Act 1988; Firearms (Amendment) Act 1997 |

Status: Current legislation

Text of statute as originally enacted

Text of the Firearms (Amendment) (No. 2) Act 1997 as in force today (including any amendments) within the United Kingdom, from legislation.gov.uk.

The Firearms (Amendment) (No. 2) Act 1997 (c. 64) is an act of the Parliament of the United Kingdom. It was the second of two acts from 1997 that amended the regulation of firearms within Great Britain. It was introduced by the newly elected Labour government of Tony Blair. The first act was the Firearms (Amendment) Act 1997.

== Background ==
The act was created in response to the Snowdrop Petition following the Dunblane Massacre. The previous Conservative government had exceeded the recommendations of the Cullen Report and introduced the Firearms (Amendment) Act 1997 that banned "high calibre" handguns, greater than .22 calibre (5.6 mm). This new (No. 2) act further prohibited the private possession of all cartridge handguns, regardless of calibre.

The only handguns still allowed following the ban were:

- Antique and muzzle-loading black-powder guns
- Firearms of historic interest whose ammunition is no longer available ("Section 7.1" firearms)
- Firearms of historic interest with current calibres ("Section 7.3" firearms) (Note: Guns of historic interest, are ones that were typically manufactured before the year 1919. Since so-called "Section 7.3" historic weapons use currently available ammunition, they must be kept at a secure designated site such as the Bisley Camp, in Surrey.)
- Air pistols (Note: Air pistols are legally required not to exceed a muzzle energy of 6 ft·lbf (8.1 J).)
- Firearms which fall outside the Home Office definition of "small firearms" (Note: Due to the difficulty of defining a handgun in a legally meaningful way, the first act defined "small firearms" based on a combination of overall length and barrel length. Certain specialist pistols - such as those used in the Olympic 50 metre pistol event - exceeded these dimensions, as do later "long-barrelled handguns". These pistols whose barrel length and overall firearm length exceed the statutory limits are treated as normal Section 1 firearms for licensing purposes.)
- Pistols used by hunters for humane dispatch

The act does not extend to Northern Ireland, where firearms regulations differ in part due to the Troubles. Northern Ireland law still allows handguns to be owned for target shooting and/or as part of a collection, just as the law in Great Britain did prior to 1997. It also allows pistols for use as personal protection weapons, mainly by retired police or prison officers, but also prominent figures who were considered at risk, while self-defence ceased to be good reason for owning firearms in the rest of the UK in the 1930s. The act also does not extend to Crown Dependencies such as the Channel Islands or the Isle of Man, where handguns are still used in target sports.

== See also ==
- Firearms regulation in the United Kingdom
