= Firearms Act 1937 =

Act of the Parliament of the United Kingdom

Firearms Act 1937 (Note: Section 34(1).)
- Act of Parliament
- Parliament of the United Kingdom
- Long title: An Act to consolidate the provisions of the Firearms Acts, 1920 to 1936, relating to firearms, imitation firearms and other weapons and to ammunition.
- Citation: 1 Edw. 8 & 1 Geo. 6. c. 12
- Territorial extent: England and Wales; Scotland; (Note: Section 34(3).)

Dates
- Royal assent: 18 February 1937
- Commencement: 1 May 1937 (Note: Section 34(4).)
- Repealed: 1 August 1968
Other legislation
Amends	See § Repealed enactments
Repeals/revokes	See § Repealed enactments
Amended by	Criminal Justice Act 1948; Criminal Justice (Scotland) Act 1949; Sexual Offences Act 1956; Police Act 1964; Firearms Act 1965; Local Government Act 1966; Local Government (Scotland) Act 1966; Criminal Law Act 1967; Police (Scotland) Act 1967
Repealed by	Firearms Act 1968

Status: Repealed

Text of statute as originally enacted

The Firearms Act 1937 (1 Edw. 8 & 1 Geo. 6. c. 12) was an act of the Parliament of the United Kingdom that consolidated enactments related to firearms, imitation firearms, and ammunition in Great Britain.

== Provisions ==
=== Repealed enactments ===
Section 34(2) of the act repealed 4 enactments, listed in the fourth schedule to the act.

Citation	Short title	Extent of repeal
10 & 11 Geo. 5. c. 43	Firearms Act 1920	The whole act except section sixteen and subsection (1) of section nineteen.
23 & 24 Geo. 5. c. 50	Firearms and Imitation Firearms (Criminal Use) Act 1933	The whole act.
24 & 25 Geo. 5. c. 16	Firearms Act 1934	The whole act.
26 Geo. 5 & 1 Edw. 8. c. 39	Firearms (Amendment) Act 1936	The whole act.

== Subsequent developments ==
The whole act was repealed by section 59(1) of, and schedule 7 to, the Firearms Act 1968 (1968 c. 27), which came into force on 1 August 1968.
