= Dunblane massacre =

1996 school shooting in central Scotland

- Gwen Mayor and her pupils, 1996
- Location: 56°11′20″N 3°58′27″W; Dunblane, Stirling, Scotland
- Date: 13 March 1996 c. 9:35–9:40 a.m. (GMT)
- Target: Pupils and staff at Dunblane Primary School
- Attack type: School shooting, mass murder, mass shooting, pedicide, murder–suicide
- Weapons: 9x19mm Browning GP Competition semi-automatic pistol; .357 Magnum Smith & Wesson Model 19-4 revolver; 9x19mm Browning Hi-Power semi-automatic pistol (unused); .357 Magnum Smith & Wesson Model 19-7 revolver (unused)
- Deaths: 18 (including the perpetrator)
- Injuries: 15
- Perpetrator: Thomas Hamilton

The Dunblane massacre was a school shooting that took place at Dunblane Primary School in Dunblane, near Stirling, Scotland, on 13 March 1996, when 43-year-old Thomas Hamilton killed 16 pupils and one teacher and injured 15 others before killing himself. It remains the deadliest mass shooting in British history.

Following the killings, public debate centred on gun control laws, including public petitions for a ban on private ownership of handguns and an official inquiry, which produced the 1996 Cullen Report.

The incident led to a public campaign, known as the Snowdrop Petition, which helped bring about legislation, specifically two new Firearms Acts, which prohibited the private ownership of most handguns in Great Britain. The UK Government instituted a buyback programme which provided compensation to licensed owners.

== Events ==
=== Preceding the shooting ===
At about 8:15 a.m. on 13 March 1996, the gunman, 43-year-old Thomas Hamilton, was seen scraping ice off his van outside his home at Kent Road in Stirling. He left soon afterwards and drove about five miles (eight kilometres) north to Dunblane. Hamilton arrived on the grounds of Dunblane Primary School at around 9:30 a.m. and parked his van near a telegraph pole in the car park of the school. He cut the telephone cables at the bottom of the telegraph pole, which served nearby houses, before making his way across the car park towards the school buildings.

Hamilton headed towards the northwest side of the school, arriving at a door near the toilets and the school gymnasium. After entering, he made his way to the gymnasium armed with four legally held handguns – two 9mm Browning HP pistols and two Smith & Wesson M19 .357 Magnum revolvers. Hamilton was also carrying 743 ammunition cartridges, consisting of 501 9 mm cartridges and 242 .357 Magnum cartridges. A class of 28 Primary 1 pupils was inside, preparing for a P.E. lesson in the presence of three adult staff members. Before entering the gymnasium, it is believed Hamilton fired two shots into the stage of the assembly hall and the girls' toilet.

=== Shooting ===
Hamilton entered the gymnasium and started shooting rapidly and randomly. He first shot P.E. teacher Eileen Harrild, who was injured in her arms and chest as she attempted to protect herself. She stumbled into the open-plan store cupboard at the side of the gym along with several injured children. Gwen Mayor, the teacher of the Primary 1 class, was shot and killed instantly. The third adult present, Mary Blake, a supervisory assistant, was shot in the head and both legs but also managed to make her way to the store cupboard with several of the children in front of her.

From entering the gymnasium and walking a few steps, Hamilton fired 29 shots with one of the pistols, killing one child and injuring several others. Four injured children took shelter in the store cupboard with the injured Harrild and Blake. Hamilton then moved up the gym's east side, firing six shots as he walked, and then fired eight shots towards the opposite end of the gym. He then went towards the centre of the gym, firing 16 shots at point-blank range at a group of children who had been incapacitated by his earlier shots.

A Primary 7 pupil who was walking along the west side of the gymnasium exterior at the time heard loud bangs and screams and looked inside. Hamilton shot in his direction, and the pupil was injured by flying glass before running away. From this position, Hamilton fired 24 shots in various directions. He fired shots towards a window next to the fire exit at the southeast end of the gym, possibly at an adult who was walking across the playground. He then fired four more shots in the same direction after opening the fire exit door. Hamilton then briefly left the gym through the fire exit and fired another four shots towards the library cloakroom, injuring Grace Tweddle, another staff member.

In the mobile classroom closest to the fire exit where Hamilton was standing, Catherine Gordon saw him firing shots and instructed her Primary 7 class to get down onto the floor. Hamilton then fired nine bullets into the classroom, striking books and equipment. One bullet passed through a chair where a child had been sitting seconds before. Hamilton then re-entered the gym, dropped the Browning pistol he had been using, and took out one of the two Magnum revolvers. He put the barrel of the gun in his mouth, pointed it upwards, and pulled the trigger, killing himself. A total of 32 people sustained gunshot wounds fired over a 3‍–‍4 minute period. Mayor and 15 pupils were fatally wounded in the gymnasium, while one other child died en route to hospital.

Hamilton fired 106 shots in total during the massacre, including the suicide shot: 105 from one of his Browning pistols, and the suicide shot from one of his Smith & Wesson revolvers. Out of the twenty-five 20-round 9 mm magazines that the shooter brought to the school, four were emptied and three were partially emptied.

=== Emergency response ===
The first call to the police was made at 9:41 a.m. by school headmaster Ronald Taylor, who had been alerted by assistant headmistress Agnes Awlson to the possibility of a gunman on the school premises. Awlson had told Taylor that she heard screaming inside the gymnasium and saw what she thought to be cartridges on the ground. Taylor had been aware of loud noises, which he assumed to have been from builders on site that he had not been informed of. As he was on his way to the gym, the shooting ended. When he saw what had happened, he ran back to his office and told deputy headmistress Fiona Eadington to call for ambulances, a call which was made at 9:43 a.m.

The first ambulance arrived on the scene at 9:57 a.m. Another medical team from Dunblane Health Centre arrived at 10:04 a.m., which included doctors and a nurse who were involved in the initial resuscitation of the injured. Medical teams from the health centres in Doune and Callander arrived shortly after. The accident and emergency department at Stirling Royal Infirmary had also been informed of a major incident involving multiple casualties at 9:48 a.m., and the first of several medical teams from the hospital arrived at 10:15 a.m. Another medical team from the Falkirk and District Royal Infirmary arrived at 10:35 a.m.

By about 11:10 a.m., all of the injured had been taken to Stirling Royal Infirmary for medical treatment. Upon examination, several of the patients were transferred to the District Royal Infirmary in Falkirk and some to the Royal Hospital for Sick Children in Glasgow.

== Perpetrator ==
Thomas Watt Hamilton was born as Thomas Watt Jr. on 10 May 1952 in Glasgow, the son of Thomas Watt Sr., a bus driver, and Agnes Graham Hamilton, a hotel chambermaid. When Hamilton was 18 months old, his father abandoned the family for another woman, after which his parents divorced and his father had no contact with him. Thomas's maternal grandparents, James and Catherine Hamilton, raised Thomas as their son, legally adopting him and changing his name to Thomas Watt Hamilton.

The family relocated to Stirling when Hamilton was a young boy. He was made to believe that his maternal grandparents were his actual parents, and that his mother was his older sister. Hamilton's grandparents told Thomas the truth when he was around 22 years old, which reportedly had a lasting psychological impact on him. He began working in youth organisations. As the head of several youth clubs, Hamilton had been the subject of several complaints to police regarding inappropriate behaviour towards young boys, including claims that he had taken photographs of semi-naked boys without parental consent. He had briefly been a Scout leader – in July 1973 at age 21, he had been appointed assistant leader with the 4th/6th Stirling troop of the Scout Association. Later that year, he was seconded as leader to the 24th Stirlingshire troop, which was being revived.

Several complaints were made about Hamilton's leadership, including complaints about Scouts being forced to sleep in close proximity to him inside his van during hill-walking expeditions. Within months, on 13 May 1974, Hamilton's Scout Warrant was withdrawn, with the County Commissioner stating that he was "suspicious of his moral intentions towards boys". He was blacklisted by the Association and thwarted in a later attempt he made to become a Scout leader in Clackmannanshire.

Hamilton claimed in letters that local rumours regarding his behaviour towards young boys had led to the failure of his business in 1993, and that, in the last months of his life, he had complained that his attempts to organise a boys' club were subjected to persecution by local police and the Scout movement. Among those he complained to were Queen Elizabeth II and his local Member of Parliament (MP), Michael Forsyth (Conservative). In the 1980s, another MP, George Robertson (Labour), who lived in Dunblane, had complained to Forsyth about Hamilton's local boys' club, which his son had attended. On the day after the massacre, Robertson spoke of having previously argued with Hamilton "in my own home".

On 19 March 1996, six days after the massacre, Hamilton's body was cremated. According to a police spokesman, this service was conducted "far away from" Dunblane.

== Subsequent legislation ==
The Cullen Report on the Dunblane massacre recommended that the Government of the United Kingdom introduce tighter controls on handgun ownership and consider whether an outright ban on private ownership would be in the public interest in the alternative (though club ownership would be maintained). The report also recommended changes in school security and vetting of people working with children under 18. The Home Affairs Select Committee agreed with the need for restrictions on gun ownership but stated that a handgun ban was not appropriate.

An advocacy group, the six-member Gun Control Network, was founded in the aftermath of the massacre and was supported by some parents of the victims of the Dunblane and Hungerford massacres shootings. Bereaved families and others also campaigned for a ban on private gun ownership.

In response to public debate, the Conservative government of Prime Minister John Major introduced the Firearms (Amendment) Act 1997 which banned all cartridge ammunition handguns with the exception of .22 calibre rimfire in England, Scotland, and Wales. Following the 1997 United Kingdom general election, the Labour government of Prime Minister Tony Blair introduced the Firearms (Amendment) (No. 2) Act 1997, banning the remaining .22 cartridge handguns as well. This left only muzzle-loading and historic handguns legal as well as certain sporting handguns (e.g. "Long-Arms") and long-barrelled handguns that fall outside the minimum barrel and overall length dimensions in the Firearms Act 1968, as amended.

This handgun ban did not apply to Northern Ireland, where it remains legal for citizens to own handguns for target shooting (if they hold a firearms licence) and, for self-defence, if the owner holds a personal protection weapon permit, almost 3000 of which were active as of 2012.

Evidence of previous police interaction with Hamilton was presented to the Cullen Inquiry but was later sealed under a closure order to prevent publication for 100 years. The official reason for sealing the documents was to protect the identities of children, but this led to accusations of a coverup intended to protect the reputations of officials. Following a review of the closure order by the Lord Advocate, Colin Boyd, edited versions of some of the documents were released to the public in October 2005. Four files containing post-mortems, medical records and profiles on the victims, as well as Hamilton's post-mortem, remained sealed under the 100-year order to avoid distressing the relatives and survivors.

The released documents revealed that in 1991 complaints against Hamilton were made to the Central Scotland Police and were investigated by the Child Protection Unit. He was reported to the Procurator Fiscal for consideration of ten charges, including assault, obstructing police and contravention of the Children and Young Persons Act 1937. Reports from serving police officers stated that he was unsuitable to own firearms; no action was taken.

== Media coverage ==
On the Sunday following the shootings the morning service from Dunblane Cathedral, conducted by Colin MacIntosh, was broadcast live by the BBC. The BBC also transmitted the 9 October 1996 memorial service live from Dunblane Cathedral. The massacre was discussed in a 2011 episode of the documentary series, Crimes That Shook Britain. The documentary Dunblane: Remembering our Children, which featured many of the parents of the children who had been killed, was broadcast by STV and ITV at the time of the first anniversary.

Martin Bryant, who murdered 35 people and wounded 23 in the Port Arthur massacre in Australia, was inspired by the Dunblane massacre and the media coverage of Hamilton to commit the massacre. In Cold Blood, a 1997 documentary exploring the psychology behind mass killings, examined the men behind the mass shootings in Dunblane, Aramoana, New Zealand and in Port Arthur – and found common traits in the three murderers.

To mark the tenth anniversary in March 2006, two documentaries were broadcast: Channel 5's Dunblane – A Decade On, and BBC Scotland's Remembering Dunblane.

Two books – Dunblane: Our Year of Tears by Peter Samson and Alan Crow and Dunblane: Never Forget by Mick North – give accounts of the massacre from the perspective of people directly affected. In 2009, the Sunday Express was criticised for an inappropriate article about the Dunblane survivors, thirteen years after the event.

On 9 March 2016 relatives of the victims spoke in a BBC Scotland documentary titled Dunblane: Our Story to mark the twentieth anniversary. A 2018 Netflix documentary, Lessons from a School Shooting: Notes from Dunblane, directed by Kim A. Snyder, drew comparison with the Sandy Hook massacre in the United States by exploring the grief and friendship between the two priests serving the affected communities at the times of the respective shootings. On 11 March 2021, ITV aired a special documentary to mark the twenty-fifth anniversary: Return to Dunblane with Lorraine Kelly in which the presenter revisited the town, speaking with the victims' families and emergency aid workers.

To mark the thirtieth anniversary in March 2026, the BBC broadcast a one-hour documentary titled Dunblane: How Britain Banned Handguns.

Tennis players Andy Murray and his brother Jamie were both pupils at Dunblane Primary School at the time and were in the school when the massacre happened. Andy took cover in a classroom; he said in 2019 that he had been too young to understand what was happening, and he is generally reluctant to talk about the event in interviews.

== Memorials and tributes ==
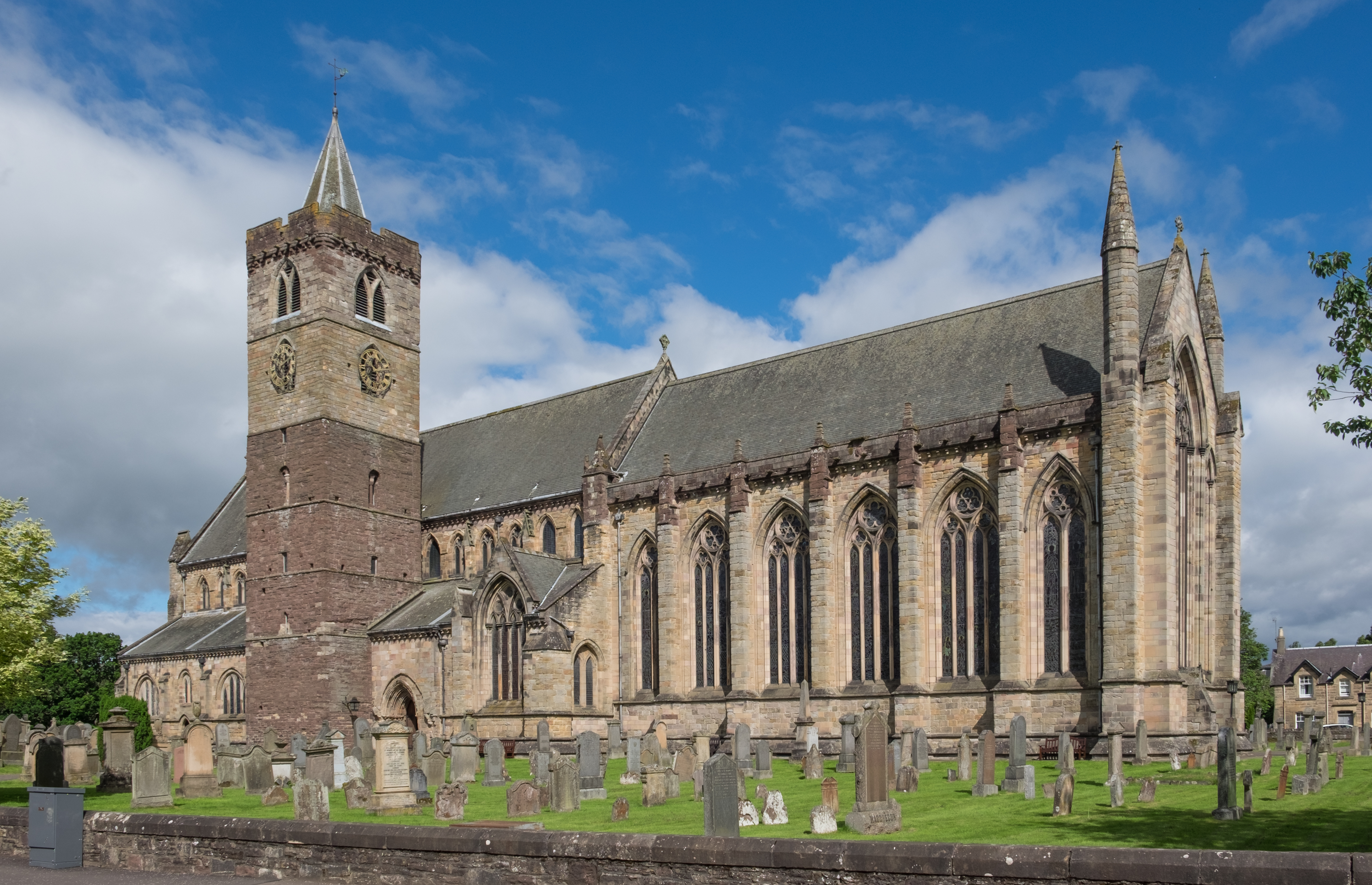
Numerous memorial services have been held at Dunblane Cathedral.

Two days after the shooting, a vigil and prayer session was held at Dunblane Cathedral which was attended by people of all faiths. On Mothering Sunday, on 17 March, Queen Elizabeth II and her daughter Anne, Princess Royal, attended a memorial service at Dunblane Cathedral.

Seven months after the massacre, in October 1996, the families of the victims organised their own memorial service at Dunblane Cathedral, which more than 600 people attended, including Prince Charles. The service was broadcast live on BBC1 and conducted by James Whyte, a former Moderator of the General Assembly of the Church of Scotland. Television presenter Lorraine Kelly, who had befriended some of the victims' families whilst reporting on the massacre for GMTV, was a guest speaker at the service.

In August 1997, two new rose varieties were unveiled and planted as the centrepiece for a roundabout in Dunblane. The roses were developed by Cockers Roses of Aberdeen: the 'Gwen Mayor' rose and the 'Innocence' rose, in memory of the children killed. A snowdrop cultivar, originally found in a Dunblane garden in the 1970s, was renamed 'Sophie North' in memory of one of the victims of the massacre.

Deaths
- Victoria Elizabeth Clydesdale (age 5)
- Emma Elizabeth Crozier (age 5)
- Melissa Helen Currie (age 5)
- Charlotte Louise Dunn (age 5)
- Kevin Allan Hasell (age 5)
- Ross William Irvine (age 5)
- David Charles Kerr (age 5)
- Mhairi Isabel MacBeath (age 5)
- Gwen Mayor (age 45) (teacher)
- Brett McKinnon (age 6)
- Abigail Joanne McLennan (age 5)
- Emily Morton (age 5)
- Sophie Jane Lockwood North (age 5)
- John Petrie (age 5)
- Joanna Caroline Ross (age 5)
- Hannah Louise Scott (age 5)
- Megan Turner (age 5)
- Thomas Hamilton (age 43) (perpetrator)

The gymnasium at the school was demolished on 11 April 1996 and replaced by a memorial garden. Two years after the massacre, on 14 March 1998, a memorial garden was opened at Dunblane Cemetery, where Mayor and twelve of the children who were killed are buried. The garden features a fountain with a plaque of the names of those killed. Stained glass windows in memory of the victims were placed in three local churches, St Blane's and the Church of the Holy Family in Dunblane and the nearby Lecropt Kirk as well as at the Dunblane Youth and Community Centre.

Newton Primary School awards The Gwen Mayor Rosebowl to a pupil every year. A charity, the Gwen Mayor Trust, was set up by the Educational Institute of Scotland to provide funding for projects in Scottish primary schools.

The National Association for Primary Education commissioned a sculpture, "Flame for Dunblane", created by Walter Bailey from a single yew tree, which was placed in the National Forest, near Moira, Leicestershire.

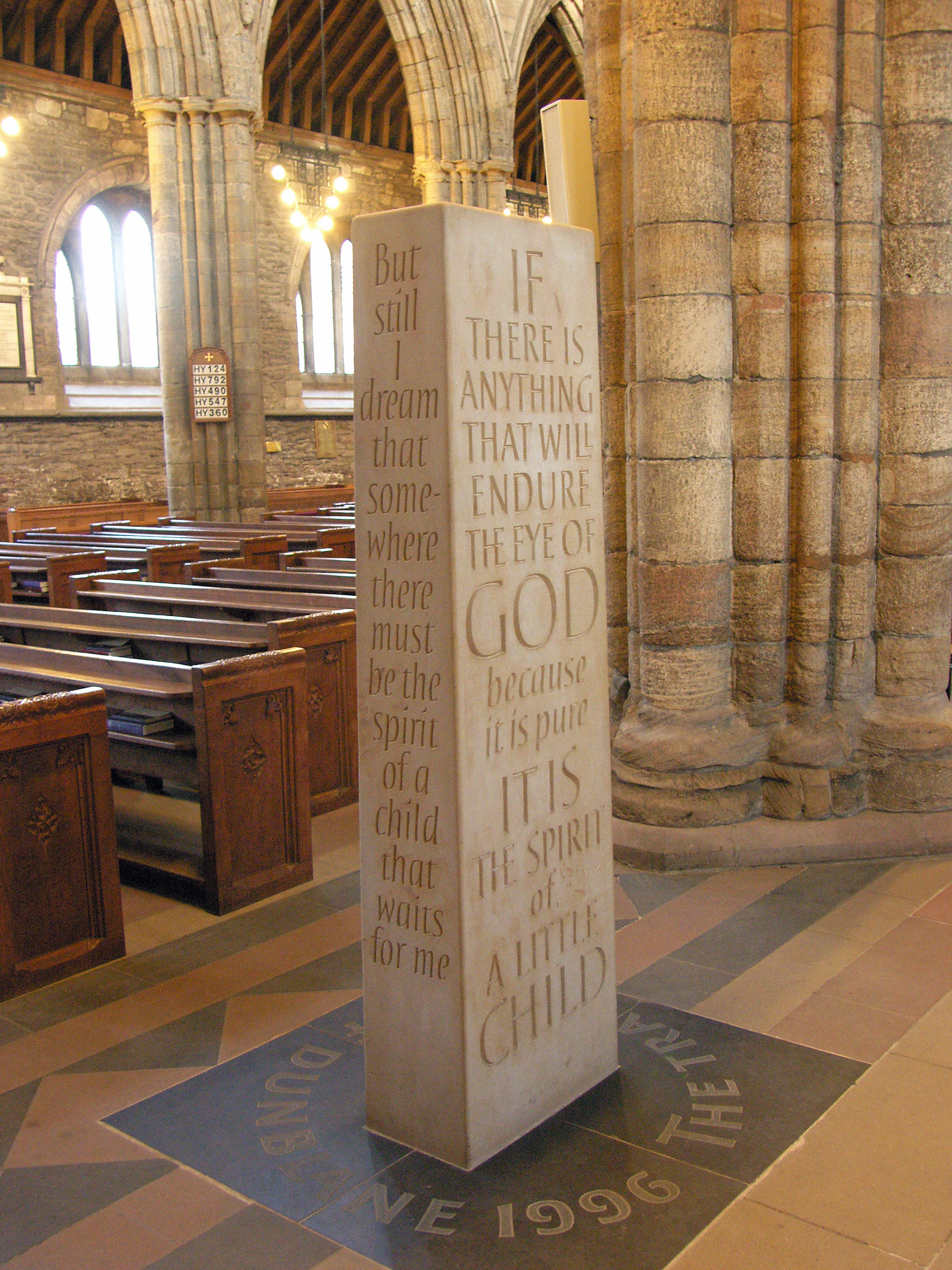
The Dunblane Commemoration standing stone in the nave of Dunblane Cathedral

The nave of Dunblane Cathedral has a standing stone by the monumental sculptor Richard Kindersley. It was commissioned by the Kirk Session as the cathedral's commemoration and dedicated at a service on 12 March 2001. It is a Clashach stone two metres high on a Caithness flagstone base. The quotations on the stone are by E. V. Rieu ("He called a little child to him..."), Richard Henry Stoddard ("...the spirit of a little child"), Bayard Taylor ("But still I dream that somewhere there must be The spirit of a child that waits for me") and W. H. Auden ("We are linked as children in a circle dancing").

With the consent of Bob Dylan, the musician Ted Christopher wrote a new verse for "Knockin' on Heaven's Door" in memory of the Dunblane school children and their teacher. The recording of the revised version of the song, which included brothers and sisters of the victims singing the chorus and Mark Knopfler on guitar, was released on 9 December 1996 in the UK, and reached number 1. The proceeds went to charities for children.

Pipe Major Robert Mathieson of the Shotts and Dykehead Pipe Band composed a pipe tune in tribute, "The Bells of Dunblane".

Scottish composer James MacMillan created a choral work, "A Child's Prayer", as a tribute to the dead at Dunblane.

English punk rock band U.K. Subs released a song called "Dunblane" on their 1997 album Quintessentials, with the chorus "After Dunblane how can you hold a gun and say you're innocent?"

Gwen Mayor was honoured with the award of the Elizabeth Emblem in 2025. The emblem is awarded by the monarch to the next of kin of public servants killed while performing their duties.

== See also ==
- Cumbria shootings, mass shooting in England in 2010
- Hungerford massacre, mass shooting in England in 1987
- List of school attacks in the United Kingdom
- List of attacks related to primary schools
- List of massacres in Great Britain
- List of rampage killers (school massacres)
- List of school massacres
- Robert Mone – responsible for a school hostage-taking and shooting in Dundee in 1967
