= Statute Law Revision Act 1966 =

Act of the Parliament of the United Kingdom

Statute Law Revision Act 1966 (Note: Section 3.)
- Act of Parliament
- Parliament of the United Kingdom
- Long title: An Act to revise the statute law by repealing obsolete, spent, unnecessary or superseded enactments.
- Citation: 1966 c. 5
- Territorial extent: United Kingdom (Note: Section 2.)

Dates
- Royal assent: 10 March 1966
- Commencement: 10 March 1966 (Note: The Acts of Parliament (Commencement) Act 1793.)
- Repealed: 27 June 1974
Other legislation
Amended by	Northern Ireland Constitution Act 1973
Repealed by	Statute Law (Repeals) Act 1974
Relates to	Repeal of Obsolete Statutes Act 1956; See Statute Law Revision Act

Status: Repealed

Text of statute as originally enacted

The Statute Law Revision Act 1966 (c. 5) was an act of the Parliament of the United Kingdom.

== Subsequent developments ==
Section 2 of the act was repealed by section 41(1) of, and part I of schedule 6 to, the Northern Ireland Constitution Act 1973, which came into force on 18 July 1973.

The whole act was repealed by section 1 of, and part XI of the schedule to, the Statute Law (Repeals) Act 1974, which came into force on 27 June 1974.

The enactments which were repealed (whether for the whole or any part of the United Kingdom) by the act were repealed so far as they extended to the Isle of Man by section 1(1) of, and schedule 1 to, the Statute Law Revision (Isle of Man) Act 1991, which came into force on 25 July 1991.

== See also ==
- Statute Law Revision Act

== Bibliography ==
- Halsbury's Statutes
- John Burke (General editor). Current Law Statutes Annotated 1966. Sweet & Maxwell, Stevens & Sons. London. W Green & Son. Edinburgh. 1966.
- HL Deb vol 271, cols 402 to 403, HC Deb vol 724, cols 1662 to 1667.
