= Firearms Act 1968 =

Act of the Parliament of the United Kingdom

Firearms Act 1968 (Note: Section 60(1).)
- Act of Parliament
- Parliament of the United Kingdom
- Long title: An Act to consolidate the Firearms Acts 1937 and 1965, the Air Guns and Shot Guns, etc., Act 1962, Part V of the Criminal Justice Act 1967 and certain enactments amending the Firearms Act 1937.
- Citation: 1968 c. 27
- Territorial extent: England and Wales; Scotland; (Note: Section 60(3).)

Dates
- Royal assent: 30 May 1968
- Commencement: 1 August 1968 (Note: Section 60(2).)
Other legislation
Amends	See § Repealed enactments
Repeals/revokes	See § Repealed enactments
Amended by	Theft Act 1968; Courts Act 1971; Criminal Damage Act 1971; Criminal Justice Act 1972; Criminal Attempts Act 1981; Child Abduction Act 1984; Firearms (Amendment) Act 1988; Firearms Acts (Amendment) Regulations 1992; Armed Forces Act 1996; Firearms (Amendment) Act 1997; Firearms (Amendment) (No. 2) Act 1997; Crime and Disorder Act 1998; Immigration and Asylum Act 1999; Criminal Justice and Police Act 2001; Anti-terrorism, Crime and Security Act 2001; Anti-social Behaviour Act 2003; Violent Crime Reduction Act 2006; Criminal Justice and Immigration Act 2008; Firearms (Amendment) Regulations 2010; Anti-social Behaviour, Crime and Policing Act 2014; Welfare of Animals at the Time of Killing Regulations 2014; Criminal Justice and Courts Act 2015; Air Weapons and Licensing (Scotland) Act 2015; Welfare of Animals at the Time of Killing (England) Regulations 2015; Policing and Crime Act 2017; Air Weapons and Licensing (Scotland) Act 2015 (Consequential Provisions) Order 2017; Offensive Weapons Act 2019; Sentencing (Pre-consolidation Amendments) Act 2020; Sentencing Act 2020; Criminal Justice Act 2003 (Commencement No. 33) and Sentencing Act 2020 (Commencement No. 2) Regulations 2022; Firearms Act 2023; Judicial Review and Courts Act 2022 (Magistrates’ Court Sentencing Powers) Regulations 2023

Status: Amended

Text of statute as originally enacted

Revised text of statute as amended

Text of the Firearms Act 1968 as in force today (including any amendments) within the United Kingdom, from legislation.gov.uk.

The Firearms Act 1968 (c. 27) is an act of the Parliament of the United Kingdom that consolidated the law regarding the control, use, and possession of firearms into one statute. It forms the foundation of modern British firearms law, bringing together and rationalising earlier statutes to regulate the manufacture, sale, possession, and use of firearms and ammunition, establishing a framework for the certification and licensing of gun owners, and defining categories of prohibited weapons and ammunition.

The act introduced, for the first time, a system of shotgun certificates alongside existing firearm certificates, both issued by local police forces under the authority of the chief constable. Applicants for firearm certificates were required to demonstrate a “good reason” for ownership and satisfy conditions of public safety, whilst shotgun certificates were subject to less stringent requirements. The act also made it an offence for certain categories of persons, such as convicted criminals, to possess firearms or ammunition, and established penalties for unlawful possession, use, or transfer.

Since its commencement on 1 August 1968, the act has been amended numerous times to respond to changing attitudes toward gun control and major incidents involving firearms. Notable amendments followed the Hungerford massacre in 1987 and the Dunblane school massacre in 1996, leading to the near-total prohibition of private handgun ownership through the Firearms (Amendment) Acts 1988 and 1997. The amended act remains the principal legal instrument governing firearms in Great Britain.

== Provisions ==
The act brought together all existing firearms legislation in a single statute. For the first time, it introduced controls for long-barrelled shotguns, in the form of shotgun certificates that, like firearm certificates, were issued by an area's chief constable in England, Scotland, and Wales. While applicants for firearms certificates had to show a good reason for possessing the firearm or ammunition, it did not apply to shotgun certificates. Firearms and ammunition had to be kept locked up in a secure place approved by the local police firearms officer.

The act also prohibited the possession of firearms or ammunition by criminals who had been sentenced to imprisonment; those sentenced to three months to three years imprisonment were banned from possessing firearms or ammunition for five years, while those sentenced to longer terms were banned for life. However, an application could be made to have the prohibition removed.

The act was accompanied by an amnesty; many older weapons were handed in to the police. It has remained a feature of British policing that from time to time a brief firearms amnesty is declared.

== Prohibited firearms and ammunition ==
Section five of part one of the act states that a prohibited firearm is one which:

- Fires more than one projectile when the trigger is pressed;
- Is a self-loading or pump-action rifled gun except when chambered for 5.6 mm rim-fire cartridges;
- Has a barrel shorter than 30 centimetres or is shorter than 60 centimetres overall, except air weapons, muzzle-loading guns and signalling firearms;
- Is a self-loading or pump-action smooth-bore gun which is not an air weapon or chambered for 5.6 mm rim-fire cartridges and has a barrel shorter than 60 cm or shorter than 100 cm overall;
- Is a smooth-bore revolver gun except chambered for 9 mm rim-fire cartridges or a muzzle-loading gun;
- Is a rocket launcher or mortar except when designed for line-throwing, pyrotechnic purposes, or for signalling;
- Is an air firearm which uses a self-contained gas cartridge system; e.g., the Brocock system of pump-up cartridges, each with their own pellet, but not a CO_{2} bulb system;
- Is a weapon of whatever description designed or adapted for the discharge of any noxious liquid, gas or other, presumably including sound or light that may cause injury.

For ammunition it is prohibited if it:

- Is designed to explode on or immediately before impact;
- Contains any such noxious item;
- Consists of a missile

Prohibited firearms and ammunition may only be possessed, purchased, sold, given, or manufactured with authority from the government. As enacted this was from the Defence Council; as of 2020 this is from the Secretary of State.

=== Repealed enactments ===
Section 59(1) of the act repealed 14 enactments, listed in schedule 7 to the act.

Enactments repealed by section 59(1)
Citation	Short title	Extent of repeal
1 Edw. 8 & 1 Geo. 6. c. 12	Firearms Act 1937	The whole act.
11 & 12 Geo. 6. c. 58	Criminal Justice Act 1948	In Schedule 9, the entry relating to the Firearms Act 1937.
12, 13 & 14 Geo. 6. c. 94	Criminal Justice (Scotland) Act 1949	In Schedule 11, the entry relating to the Firearms Act 1937.
15 & 16 Geo. 6 & 1 Eliz. 2. c. 55	Magistrates' Courts Act 1952	In Schedule 5, the entry relating to section 23(4) of the Firearms Act 1937.
15 & 16 Geo. 6 & 1 Eliz. 2. c. 52	Prison Act 1952	In Schedule 3, the entry relating to section 21(2) of the Firearms Act 1937.
15 & 16 Geo. 6 & 1 Eliz. 2. c. 61	Prisons (Scotland) Act 1952	In Schedule 3, the entry relating to section 21(2) of the Firearms Act 1937.
4 & 5 Eliz. 2. c. 69	Sexual Offences Act 1956	In Schedule 3, the entry relating to the Firearms Act 1937.
10 & 11 Eliz. 2. c. 49	Air Guns and Shot Guns, etc. Act 1962	The whole act.
1964 c. 48	Police Act 1964	In Schedule 9, the entry relating to the Firearms Act 1937.
1965 c. 44	Firearms Act 1965	The whole act.
1966 c. 42	Local Government Act 1966	In Part II of Schedule 3, the entry (numbered 19) relating to the Firearms Act 1937.
1966 c. 51	Local Government (Scotland) Act 1966	In Part II of Schedule 4, the entry (numbered 17) relating to the Firearms Act 1937.
1967 c. 77	Police (Scotland) Act 1967	In Schedule 4, the entry relating to the Firearms Act 1937.
1967 c. 80	Criminal Justice Act 1967	Part V (that is to say, sections 85 to 88).

== Subsequent developments ==
Since 1968, the act has been extensively amended. Following the Hungerford massacre, the Firearms (Amendment) Act 1988 extended the class of prohibited weapons. Following the Dunblane school massacre, two acts were passed, the Firearms (Amendment) Act 1997 and, after the general election that year, the Firearms (Amendment) (No. 2) Act 1997, which in effect banned almost all handguns. The Policing and Crime Act 2017 brought clarity to aspects of the act, following a recommendation from the Law Commission.

== See also ==
- Firearms regulation in the United Kingdom
