= The Cullen Reports =

Reports into UK disasters

The Cullen Report can refer to one of three reports of public inquiries into UK disasters that were overseen by William Cullen, Baron Cullen of Whitekirk.

== Piper Alpha ==
The first Cullen Report was prompted by Occidental Petroleum's Piper Alpha disaster on 6 July 1988, in which gas condensate ignited, killing 167 of the 229 people on board the oil platform in only 22 minutes.

== Dunblane Massacre ==
In 1996, Lord Cullen led the inquiry into the massacre at Dunblane Primary School.

== Ladbroke Grove ==
The third Cullen Report was a result of Lord Cullen's appointment to chair the 1999 Ladbroke Grove Rail Inquiry.
