= List of massacres in Great Britain =

== Inclusion criteria ==
This is a list of massacres that have occurred in the purely geographical definition of the island of Great Britain and minor outlying islands and excludes Northern Ireland and massacres in Ireland before independence.

== List ==
Date	Name	Location	Deaths	Injuries	Notes
211	Severan Genocide	Stirlingshire and Perthshire	unknown		Cassius Dio's Roman History (Book LXXVII, Chapter 15) records that Septimius Severus ordered the following When the inhabitants of the island again revolted, he summoned the soldiers and ordered them to invade the rebels' country, killing everybody they met; and he quoted these words: "Let no one escape sheer destruction, No one our hands, not even the babe in the womb of the mother, If it be male; let it nevertheless not escape sheer destruction."
60 or 61	Boudica's attacks on Roman cities	Camulodunum (modern-day Colchester), Londinium (modern-day London), Verulamium (modern-day St Albans)	70,000–80,000 (Mostly Britons)		Forces led by Boudica, Queen of the Iceni tribe, massacred both Romans and Britons in Camulodunum, Londinium and Verulamium. Her forces were later defeated by the Romans at the Battle of Watling Street.
633–634	Cadwallon ap Cadfan's occupation of Northumbria	Northumbria	Unknown		King Cadwallon ap Cadfan of Gwynedd, defeated and occupied the Kingdom of Northumbria after allying with King Penda of Mercia. Bede describes Cadwallon's actions during the occupation, stating "though he bore the name and professed himself a Christian, was so barbarous in his disposition and behaviour, that he neither spared the female sex, nor the innocent age of children, but with savage cruelty put them to tormenting deaths, ravaging all their country for a long time, and resolving to cut off all the race of the English within the borders of Britain". Cadwallon's occupation ended when he was killed at the Battle of Heavenfield.
13 November 1002	St. Brice's Day massacre	Territory of England under Anglo-Saxon control	Unknown		The St. Brice's Day massacre was the extermination of immigrant Danes, their families and descendants, including those of mixed Danish and Anglo-Saxon descent on orders of the Anglo-Saxon King Æthelred the Unready and took place in remaining territory in his control in what is now England, at a time England was subject to Danelaw. Gunhilde sister of Sweyn Forkbeard, the King of Denmark was a victim along with her husband Pallig Tokesen
1066	Harald Hardrada's attack on Scarborough	Scarborough	No survivors		Attack by Vikings led by Harald Hardrada and Tostig Godwinson. A prelude to the Battle of Stamford Bridge and ultimately the Battle of Hastings in 1066. Scarborough was subsequently absent from the Domesday Book.
1069–1070	Harrying of the North	The North of England between the Humber and the Tees	100,000		William the Conqueror's men burnt whole villages and slaughtered the inhabitants. Foodstores and livestock were destroyed so that anyone surviving the initial massacre would starve over the winter.
October 1136	Massacre of Norman, English, and Flemish Settlers	Cardigan and surrounding areas	10,000		Following the victory of Gwynedd and Deheubarth over the Norman forces at the Battle of Crug Mawr, the Welsh targeted the foreign settler population. Many fled to the fortified town of Cardigan for safety, which was subsequently taken and burned by the Welsh.
16 March 1190	Massacre of the Jews at York	York, England	150		"A wave of anti-Semitic riots culminated in the massacre of an estimated 150 Jews – the entire Jewish community of York – who had taken refuge in the royal castle where Clifford's Tower now stands. The chronicler William of Newburgh described the rioters in York as acting 'without any scruple of Christian conscientiousness' in wiping out the Jewish community."
30 March 1296	Massacre of Berwick	Berwick-upon-Tweed, Scotland (at the time)	7,500–16,000	unknown	After besieging the Scottish town, English troops massacred the civilian and military population.
10–12 February 1355	St Scholastica Day riot	Oxford, England	93	Unknown	A riot culminating from tensions between the people of the city of Oxford and the academic community of the University.
21 October 1490	Massacre of Monzievaird	Monzievaird, Scotland	possibly 120		Blood feud between the Murray and Drummond families.
1521	Amersham Martyrdoms	Amersham, Buckinghamshire	7		Massacre of Lollards for the heresy of reading the Bible in English
1549	Clyst Heath Massacre	Clyst Heath, Devon	900		Massacre of bound and gagged rebels from Cornwall and Devon taken prisoner during the Prayer Book Rebellion.
1577	Eigg massacre	Isle of Eigg, Scotland	395		Clan warfare: according to the Clanranald legend, all but one of the Isle of Eigg's MacDonald clan were asphyxiated by their rival MacLeod clan in the massacre cave on the south coast of the island.
28 May 1644	Storming of Bolton	Bolton, England	1,600		During the English Civil War, Royalist forces under Prince Rupert of the Rhine slaughtered a large population of the strongly Parliamentarian town of Bolton.
September 1644	Sack of Aberdeen	Aberdeen, Scotland	118-160		During the Wars of the Three Kingdoms, Royalist forces under General Montrose sacked the city of Aberdeen after it defied his authority.
1645	Battle of Philiphaugh	Philiphaugh, Scotland	400		During the Wars of the Three Kingdoms, Irish soldiers and camp followers killed after surrender by the Covenanters.
1646	Dunoon massacre	Dunoon, Scotland	200		Rivalry between Clan Campbell and neighbours of the Clan Lamont
May 1647	Battle of Dunaverty	Kintyre, Scotland	300		More than 300 of MacDougalls and MacDonald's followers, men, women and children, were slaughtered at Dunaverty after being promised quarter (mercy) by the Covenanters.
13 February 1692	Massacre of Glencoe	Glen Coe, Scotland	78		Committed by government troops under Captain Robert Campbell of Glenlyon, for failing to swear an oath of allegiance to the newly crowned William of Orange.
9 March 1761	Hexham Riot	Hexham	45 - 51?	300 est.	Massacre of demonstrators at Hexham Market Place by North Yorkshire militia.
10 May 1768	Massacre of St George's Fields	London, England	6–7		Committed by the Horse Grenadier Guards and the Third Regiment of Foot Guards during a riot against the imprisonment of John Wilkes in St. George's Fields.
29 October 1797	Massacre of Tranent	Tranent, East Lothian, Scotland	12		Townsfolk, including women and children, were killed by members of the Cinque Ports Dragoons, a fencible cavalry regiment, during a protest against the Act of Parliament to raise a Scots militia by a form of conscription.
16 August 1819	Peterloo Massacre	Manchester, Lancashire, England	15	400–700	Committed by the 15th Hussars and the Manchester and Salford Yeomanry during a large outdoor political demonstration for male universal suffrage in St. Peter's Field. Led to the enacting of the Six Acts.
May – 7 June 1831	Merthyr Rising	Merthyr Tydfil, Wales	24-26	70+	Described by historian John Davies as "the most ferocious and bloody event in the history of industrialised Britain", the rebellion in Merthyr Tydfil and surrounding areas broke out following protests against falling wages, the price of bread, and forced redundancy. During the bloodiest incident, Argyll and Sutherland Highlander troops sent to retake Merthyr fired on protesters during a fight against a large crowd.
4 November 1839	Newport Rising	Newport, Wales	22	50+	Led by John Frost, between 1,000 and 5,000 Chartist sympathisers armed with home-made weapons marched on Newport, intent on liberating fellow Chartists who had reportedly been taken prisoner. About 22 demonstrators were killed when troops opened fire on them. The leaders of the rebellion were convicted of high treason, and sentenced to transportation for life.
12/13 August 1842	Preston Strike of 1842	Preston, Lancashire, England	4	3+	The Mayor Samuel Horrocks read the Riot Act. This gave local authorities the right to use force if necessary to disperse unlawful assemblies and stop riots. When violence escalated and the crowd did not disperse, the 72nd Highlanders fired into the crowd, shooting at least eight men.
13 December 1867	Clerkenwell explosion	London, England	12	120	The Irish Republican Brotherhood attempted to free a member named Ricard O'Sullivan Burke from Clerkenwell Prison by blowing up a wall with gunpowder. The explosion damaged several nearby buildings and killed twelve people. No prisoners escaped.
25 August 1939	Coventry bombing	Coventry, England	5	70	A bicycle bomb planted by the Irish Republican Army exploded without warning on Broadgate in Coventry city centre. Five bystanders were killed and there were over 70 injuries, 12 of them serious. Two of the perpetrators, Peter Barnes and James McCormick were convicted and executed for the crime.
22 February 1972	Aldershot bombing	Aldershot, England	7	18	A car bomb outside the headquarters of the British Army's 16th Parachute Regiment by Official IRA member Noel Jenkinson.
4 February 1974	M62 coach bombing	West Yorkshire, England	12	38	A bombing on a coach carrying servicemen and their families by the Provisional Irish Republican Army.
5 October 1974	Guildford pub bombings	Guildford, England	5	65	Two bombs detonated in two Guildford pubs by the PIRA who targeted them because they were popular with British servicemen.
21 November 1974	Birmingham pub bombings	Birmingham, England	21	182	Two bombs detonated in two Birmingham pubs by the PIRA.
16 August 1980	Denmark Place fire	London, England	37		An arson attack against a nightclub on Denmark Street by patron who was angry at being barred from the club for arguing with a barman. Described – before the Lockerbie bombing – as the deadliest mass murder in modern British history.
19 August 1987	Hungerford massacre	Hungerford, England	16	15	A spree shooting/murder–suicide. Led to the Firearms (Amendment) Act 1988.
21 December 1988	Lockerbie bombing	Lockerbie, Scotland	270		Bombing on the Pan Am Flight 103; the dead included eleven locals on the ground.
26 February 1994	Clerkenwell cinema fire	London, England	11	13	An arson attack against a cinema in Clerkenwell by patron who was angry at having to pay entry fee again after leaving.
13 March 1996	Dunblane massacre	Dunblane, Scotland	17	15	A school shooting/murder–suicide. Deadliest mass shooting in UK history.
7 July 2005	7 July 2005 London bombings	London, England	52	700+	Al-Qaeda attack. Four coordinated terrorist Suicide bombings in central London between 08:50 and 09:47. It was the United Kingdom's worst terrorist incident since the 1988 Lockerbie bombing.
2 June 2010	Cumbria shootings	Cumbria, England	12	11	A killing spree/murder–suicide.
14 August 2011	Rzeszowski family homicides	St Helier, Jersey	6	0	A mass stabbing and Familicide committed by Damian Rzeszowski.
1 January 2012	Horden shooting	Horden, England	4	1	A mass shooting/murder–suicide.
22 March 2017	2017 Westminster attack	London, England	6	49	A vehicle and knife Islamist terrorist attack outside the Palace of Westminster.
22 May 2017	Manchester Arena bombing	Manchester, England	23	1017	Islamist terrorist suicide attack at Manchester Arena after an Ariana Grande concert. In May 2018, the number of injured was revised to 800.
3 June 2017	2017 London Bridge attack	London, England	8	48	Islamic State (ISIS) vehicle and knife attack.
29 November 2019	2019 London Bridge stabbings	London, England	3	3	Five people were stabbed, two of them fatally, in Central London. The attacker, Usman Khan, was fatally shot by City of London Police.
29 March 2020	2020 Woodmancote shooting	Woodmancote, England	4	0	A man shot and killed his wife and two daughters with a shotgun before killing himself.
20 June 2020	2020 Reading stabbings	Reading, England	3	3	A man armed with a kitchen knife attacked six people in Forbury Gardens, killing three and seriously injuring three others.
12 August 2021	2021 Plymouth shooting	Plymouth, England	6	2	Six people killed including the gunman after a mass shooting in Keyham, Plymouth. The gunman was Jake William Davison.
25 April 2022	2022 Bermondsey stabbing	London, England	4	0	28-year-old Joshua Jacques stabbed four people to death.
13 June 2023	2023 Nottingham attacks	Nottingham, England	3	5	31-year-old Valdo Calocane fatally stabbed three people, and three others were injured when a van was driven into them.
29 July 2024	2024 Southport stabbings	Southport, England	3	10	17-year old Axel Rudakubana killed three children and injured ten others at a Taylor Swift–themed yoga and dance workshop.
13 September 2024	Prosper family murders	Luton, England	3	0	18-year-old Nicholas Prosper shot dead his mother, brother and sister.
