= List of mass shootings in the United Kingdom =

This article is a list of mass shootings in the United Kingdom. Mass shootings are firearm-related violence with at least four casualties. This list does not include violence during the Troubles. As of April 2026, 415 people have died and 664 people have been injured in 201 mass shootings, with a total of 1,079 casualties (including perpetrator/s).

== 21st century ==
=== 2020s ===
Date	Location	Dead	Injured	Total	Description
2 May 2026	Brixton, England	1	3	4	One man was killed and three others injured after being shot in a drive-by at a barbecue on Coldharbour Lane. No arrests were made.
23 July 2025	Maguiresbridge, Northern Ireland	4 (Note: Including the perpetrator/s or suspect/s)	0	4	Two children and their parents died after being shot at their home; the father, who is suspected to be the perpetrator, died later in hospital.
18 July 2025	Leyland, England	0	4	4	Four people were injured after a shotgun was discharged near a pub.
29 May 2024	Hackney, England	0	4	4	A nine-year-old girl and three men were seriously injured in a gang-related drive-by shooting in Dalston.
14 January 2023	Camden, England	0	6	6	Euston shooting: Six people, including a seven-year-old girl, were shot during a drive-by shooting near a church in Euston and a 7 year old girl was left in a critical condition.
24 December 2022	Wallasey, England	1	4	5	Wallasey pub shooting: A gunman fired at a busy pub entrance in Wallasey Village, killing one and injuring four.
25 October 2022	Ilford, England	2	2	4	Two men were shot dead and two others were injured during a quadruple shooting inside a property near Ilford Lane. The gunmen fired 47 gunshots total. One man was left in a critical condition after being shot in the head.
18 June 2022	Lambeth, England	0	5	5	Five people were shot during a gang related shooting in Clapham and one man was left in a critical condition.
14 August 2021	Camden, England	0	4	4	Four people were shot during a crowded barbecue in Clarence Gardens.
12 August 2021	Plymouth, England	6	2	8	Plymouth shooting: A man fatally shot five people, including his mother, and wounded two others in Keyham, before killing himself nearby.
25 July 2021	Manchester, England	0	4	4	Four people were shot by a gunman during an engagement party in Longsight.
13 June 2021	Brixton, England	0	6	6	Six people were shot during a gang related shooting in Brixton on Coldharbour Lane leaving one man in a critical condition.
3 August 2020	Birmingham, England	0	5	5	Five people were shot when gunmen opened fired into a crowd at a street party in Winson Green.
3 June 2020	Brent, England	0	4	4	Four people, including a two-year-old boy, were shot in Harlesden.
29 March 2020	Woodmancote, England	4	0	4	A man shot and killed his wife and two daughters with a shotgun before killing himself.

=== 2010s ===
Date	Location	Dead	Injured	Total	Description
30 June 2019	Birmingham, England	0	4	4	Four people were injured at a barbecue in Winson Green.
12 August 2018	Manchester, England	0	12	12	Twelve people were shot in the Moss Side neighbourhood.
25 March 2016	Forest Gate, England	0	5	5	A drive-by shooting left five people wounded.
10 October 2015	Hockley, England	0	4	4	A shooting incident at a Costcutter shop left four men wounded.
4 August 2012	Bootle, England	0	4	4	Four teenagers suffered shotgun wounds in a street.
25 May 2012	Droylsden, England	1	3	4	A man shot and killed one person and wounded three others at Cotton Tree Pub.
1 January 2012	Horden, England	4	1	5	Horden shooting: A man killed three women in a domestic violence incident. He wounded another person before killing himself.
9 July 2010	London, England	0	5	5	Five men were wounded in St. James Garden, Brixton.
13 June 2010	Birmingham, England	0	4	4	A shooting incident at Digbeth's Custard Factory left three men and one woman wounded.
2 June 2010	Cumbria, England	13	11	24	Cumbria shootings: A man killed twelve people, including his brother, at separate locations. The gunman wounded eleven others before killing himself.

=== 2000s ===
Date	Location	Dead	Injured	Total	Description
11 September 2009	London, England	0	5	5	Six teenagers were hospitalized after five were shot and another stabbed in Tottenham.
1 July 2009	Sheffield, England	1	3	4	A man was killed and three other men wounded in a shooting in Broomhall.
7 March 2009	Antrim, Northern Ireland	2	4	6	Massereene Barracks shooting: Two gunmen opened fire outside Massereene Barracks on four soldiers receiving a pizza delivery, killing two of them and injuring the two other soldiers and two deliverymen. The Real Irish Republican Army claimed responsibility.
1 January 2007	London, England	0	4	4	Four people were shot and wounded during a New Year's Eve party at a club in Islington.
9 December 2006	Ipswich, England	1	3	4	A shooting at a nightclub left one man dead and three other people wounded.
14 November 2006	Luton, England	0	4	4	A gunman shot at a crowd in the street, wounding four people before fleeing.
13 July 2006	Bradford, England	0	5	5	A gunman opened fire in a barbershop, wounding five people.
9 July 2006	Newcastle upon Tyne, England	4	0	4	A man shot and killed four of his family members. He surrendered at a local police station.
12 March 2006	Salford, England	2	2	4	Two gunmen opened fire in a pub in a gang-related attack, wounding two other men. The shooters were disarmed and shot dead with their own firearms by patrons.
9 December 2005	Balloch, Scotland	0	4	4	Four men sustained shotgun wounds as they walked home.
18 July 2005	Newcastle, Northern Ireland	0	4	4	Four people were wounded in a drive-by shooting.
20 November 2004	Birmingham, England	1	3	4	Several gunmen opened fire as they attempted to enter a nightclub, killing a doorman and wounding three other employees.
9 November 2003	Belfast, Northern Ireland	0	4	4	Four men were injured outside an apartment complex in what was described as a "paramilitary-style punishment attack".
2 January 2003	Birmingham, England	2	3	5	Murder of Charlene Ellis and Letisha Shakespeare: Two teenage girls were shot and killed leaving a party in Aston. Three more were wounded. The drive-by shooting was part of a feud between two Birmingham gangs following the murder of a member of one gang.
9 November 2002	London, England	0	4	4	Four people were shot and wounded during a mass brawl in Haringey, involving knives, bats, and guns. Another man was stabbed to death.
23 June 2002	Leeds, England	0	4	4	A gunman opened fire inside a pub in Cross Gates, wounding three employees and a customer before fleeing.
1 June 2002	Bradford, England	0	4	4	After two men were expelled from a nightclub, one of them fired a shotgun at people leaving the club, wounding four.
27 December 2001	Birmingham, England	0	4	4	After a disturbance outside a nightclub in Aston, shots were fired, wounding four people.
25 November 2001	Liverpool, England	0	5	5	A gunman fired shots inside a pub in Toxteth, wounding five people.
2 September 2001	Oldham, England	0	4	4	After a man was stabbed outside a pub, a gunman injured four people inside the establishment before fleeing.
14 July 2001	Leeds, England	1	5	6	Four people were found shot in a car park outside a hotel in Chapeltown, one of whom died in hospital. This shooting was linked to a nearby shooting that occurred two hours earlier, leaving two men wounded.
6 May 2001	Harrow, England	4	0	4	A man shot and killed three family members with a shotgun before killing himself.
22 February 2001	Blackburn, England	1	3	4	Two people fired shots through the door of a house, striking four men inside, one of whom died.
2 February 2001	Camberley, England	4	0	4	A man shot and killed his wife and two children before killing himself.
18 August 2000	Belfast, Northern Ireland	0	4	4	Four people were injured by gunfire during a sectarian fight between loyalists.
31 July 2000	London, England	0	8	8	Two gunmen shot and wounded eight people outside a nightclub in Peckham.

== 20th century ==
=== 1990s ===
Date	Location	Dead	Injured	Total	Description
4 May 1999	London, England	0	7	7	Two shooters exchanged gunfire at a nightclub in Hackney, wounding seven people.
23 April 1999	Rochdale, England	0	5	5	A man opened fire from his car on officers and pedestrians during a police chase, wounding five people before being arrested along with two accomplices.
23 August 1997	near Winsick, England	0	4	4	Four people sustained shotgun wounds during a shooting at a caravan site.
10 March 1997	London, England	1	3	4	One person was killed and three others wounded when a gunman opened fire in a nightclub in Camberwell.
15 November 1996	Barrmill, Scotland	0	4	4	Three men and an 11-year-old boy were wounded by gunfire inside a home.
13 March 1996	Dunblane, Scotland	18	15	33	Dunblane massacre: A man entered Dunblane Primary School and opened fire, killing sixteen pupils and one teacher. The shooter wounded fifteen others before killing himself.
14 July 1994	Aylesbury, England	0	4	4	A gunman wounded four people in a pub with a handgun before being stabbed and arrested.
25 June 1994	Glastonbury, England	0	5	5	A man shot and wounded five people at the Glastonbury Festival before being arrested.
4 March 1994	Grays, England	0	11	11	Eleven people were wounded when a man fired a shotgun at a crowd gathered outside his apartment.
16 July 1993	Bradford, England	0	6	6	Six people were wounded when four gunmen with shotguns fired into a nightclub.
8 July 1993	Cairnryan, Scotland	1	3	4	A robber attacked a family of German tourists, shooting a man dead and wounding his wife and two children. He also stabbed one of the children, but she survived.
15 May 1993	Forth, Scotland	1	4	5	A man kidnapped a couple, shooting the male dead and forcing the female out of the vehicle before fleeing. As police investigated the murder, the gunman opened fire on them in an ambush, wounding three officers before he was wounded by return fire and arrested.
15 May 1992	Birmingham, England	4	0	4	A man fatally shot his wife and two daughters at their home in Alum Rock before killing himself.
7 March 1992	Aberaeron, Wales	3	1	4	A man killed his ex-wife and her father and wounded her mother before killing himself.
11 October 1991	Nottingham, England	4	0	4	A man wanted for traffic crimes shot and killed his three children and himself with a handgun.
3 August 1991	London, England	2	4	6	Two masked gunmen killed two people and wounded four others at a pub in Walworth.
18 March 1990	Glasgow, Scotland	2	5	7	After striking a person's car with his own vehicle, a man opened fire into a crowd of people attempting to help the crash victims, killing one and wounding five. The shooter killed himself afterwards.

=== 1980s ===
Date	Location	Dead	Injured	Total	Description
20 July 1989	near Gravesend, England	1	4	5	At least three gunmen opened fire at a traveler's camp, killing one person and wounding four others.
30 April 1989	Monkseaton, England	1	14	15	Monkseaton shootings: A man fired indiscriminately at people outside his home, killing one person and wounding fourteen. He fled the scene and was arrested in nearby Whitley Bay.
11 September 1988	Walsall, England	1	3	4	An intoxicated man fired a shotgun at people near a nightclub, wounding three, before killing himself in front of police.
7 March 1988	London, England	2	2	4	A man opened fire at two homes in Hackney, killing two people and wounding two others before being arrested.
10 January 1988	Derry, Northern Ireland	5	0	5	A man killed four family members with a shotgun before killing himself.
6 January 1988	Higham Ferrers, England	0	4	4	Higham Ferrers School shooting: An expelled student entered his former school and wounded four people with a shotgun before being arrested.
11 November 1987	London, England	3	1	4	Dormers Wells High School shooting: Two Sikhs opened fire at a prayer meeting held at a secondary school in Southall, killing three men and injuring another. They were then subdued and slightly injured by the congregation. In 1989, both were sentenced to life imprisonment.
19 August 1987	Hungerford, England	17	15	32	Hungerford massacre: A man roamed the town and indiscriminately shot at passersby. Sixteen people were killed and fifteen others wounded before the shooter was surrounded by police and killed himself.
15 May 1987	Kingston upon Hull, England	0	10	10	A local student shot and injured nine people with a shotgun at a bar before attempting suicide.
3 March 1987	Manchester, England	1	3	4	Shots fired through the door of an illegal drinking club in the Moss Side neighborhood killed one person and wounded three.
13 February 1987	London, England	3	1	4	A man killed his wife and two teenaged children with a pistol at their home in East Dulwich before non-fatally shooting himself in the head.
19 December 1986	Oakley Green, England	0	4	4	Somebody fired a shotgun into two vehicles, wounding four occupants. A 40-year-old man was charged with attempted murder of one of the wounded.
17 November 1986	London, England	0	5	5	A man opened fire outside a pub, wounding five people.
May 1986	near Ashford, England	0	5	5	Three adults and two children were wounded at a caravan site.
21 April 1986	Redruth, England	6	0	6	A man killed his wife and four children before killing himself.
7 August 1985	Tolleshunt D'Arcy, England	5	0	5	White House Farm murders: A man shot five relatives to death. He fled the scene, but was arrested.
12 July 1985	Great Yarmouth, England	4	0	4	Four people were found shot dead at a house in a domestic-related incident.
March 1985	London, England	0	4	4	Four people were wounded at a pub in Southwark.
30 November 1984	Glenrothes, Scotland	1	5	6	A paper mill worker fired at co-workers, killing a man and wounding five others. He was remanded in custody.
17 April 1984	London, England	1	11	12	Murder of Yvonne Fletcher: A gunman opened fire from the Libyan embassy in Westminster towards a crowd of protesters. A Metropolitan Police officer was killed and eleven demonstrators were wounded.
28 March 1984	near Barnburgh/Rotherham England	4	0	4	A man shot and killed his wife and daughter before driving to his mother's house and killing her. He shot himself to death as police investigated the site.
17 December 1983	London, England	4	1	5	A former police cadet killed two family members and a friend before killing himself. A third family member was wounded.
3 February 1983	near Ludlow, England	4	0	4	A man shot and killed his wife, two children, and five dogs, and set their house on fire before killing himself.
28 December 1981	Orpington, England	0	6	6	A gunman opened fire with a shotgun at a community centre following an argument, wounding six people.

=== 1970s ===
Date	Location	Dead	Injured	Total	Description
30 December 1978	Brampton, England	1	3	4	After a domestic dispute with his girlfriend, a man became upset and opened fire on his sister and her boyfriend at his family's home. He then fired at and wounded three neighbours and took another hostage. During a gun battle with police, a law enforcement marksman killed the shooter.
26 October 1978	West Bromwich and Nuneaton, England	5	3	8	West Bromwich and Nuneaton shootings: A man opened fire on his neighbours, killing three and wounding three. Two others were killed as the gunman went on a shooting spree. The shooter was arrested in Buxton the following day.
20 August 1978	London, England	2	9	11	1978 London bus attack: Members of the Popular Front for the Liberation of Palestine shot at people and detonated grenades outside a hotel in Grosvenor Square, killing one and wounding nine. One of the assailants was killed, while another was arrested.
24 September 1976	Penmaenmawr, Wales	5	0	5	Penmaenmawr Killings: A hotel employee shot and killed the owner and three others before setting the hotel on fire and killing himself.
1 September 1975	Leicester, England	3	2	5	A man opened fire from his home, killing three people and wounding two before being arrested.
3 October 1974	Torquay, England	4	0	4	A man shot three people dead at an unemployment office before killing himself.
April 1974	Temple Ewell, England	4	0	4	Four family members were discovered shot dead on 24 April in a triple murder–suicide.
20 March 1974	London, England	0	4	4	Attempted kidnapping of Anne, Princess Royal: A schizophrenic man shot and wounded four people with a pistol as he attempted to kidnap Anne, Princess Royal.
21 December 1973	Torquay, England	4	2	6	A man shot and killed a police officer before heading to a casino, where he shot five people, killing three. The shooter fled the scene, but was arrested in Newton Poppleford.
20 May 1973	London, England	4	0	4	Four family members were killed in a triple murder–suicide at a home in Wimbledon.
21 December 1972	London, England	0	5	5	Five bystanders were wounded as a criminal opened fire during a bank truck robbery in Plaistow.
3 July 1971	London, England	0	4	4	Rifle shots were fired into a pub from a car outside, wounding four people.
24 June 1971	Cragg Vale, England	4	0	4	A man shot and killed his wife and two children before killing himself at their home.
5 May 1970	Dunholme, England	0	4	4	A soldier on leave from Germany wounded four people.

=== 1960s ===
Date	Location	Dead	Injured	Total	Description
15 July 1969	Glasgow, Scotland	2	13	15	A career criminal opened fire at multiple locations, killing one person and wounding thirteen before being killed by police.
March 1969	Tewkesbury, England	4	0	4	A man shot and killed four family members before fleeing. He was arrested and institutionalized, but released in 1985. The perpetrator murdered his partner in 1998 before killing himself.
January 1969	Choppington, England	0	4	4	Four children were wounded by shotgun pellets.
22 June 1968	Coleraine, Northern Ireland	0	4	4	A man with a shotgun wounded four people in a dispute.
26 April 1968	London, England	0	4	4	After a dispute and assault at a nightclub, somebody fired a shotgun outside, wounding four individuals.
22 December 1967	West Bromwich, England	0	6	6	Six people were shot and wounded during a fight outside a fish and chip shop.
15 May 1967	London, England	4	0	4	A financier killed his wife and two children with a revolver at their home in Wimbledon before killing himself.
18 April 1967	Hardwicke, England	4	0	4	A student killed his parents and sister at their home before killing himself.
8 March 1966	London, England	1	4	5	Five people were shot, one fatally, in a gunfight at a nightclub.
16 November 1965	near Durley, England	4	0	4	A man killed his wife and two children with a shotgun before killing himself.
November 1965	Glasgow, Scotland	0	4	4	Four people were wounded. A young man was sought.
10 February 1965	Oxenholme, England	1	3	4	A man shot three police officers at Oxenholme railway station, killing one. He non-fatally shot himself as police encroached on him near Oxenholme.
6 November 1964	Derby, England	4	0	4	A man killed his wife and two children at their home before going to his separate home and killing himself.
11 November 1963	Smethwick, England	1	4	5	A woman was killed and four other people wounded at a house. One of the wounded was arrested.
18 February 1962	London, England	1	3	4	A man went to see his former girlfriend in Tottenham and shot her and two other men in the house before killing himself. The victims all survived.
27 June 1961	London, England	0	4	4	After an argument at an house in Sydenham, four people were shot and injured. A man was under questioning by police.
3 June 1961	London, England	3	2	5	A man shot four police officers, two fatally, in West Ham. He fatally shot himself later that day as police enclosed on his location.
1 January 1960	Sheffield, England	3	2	5	East House mass shooting: A man opened fire in a pub, killing three people and wounding two before being arrested.

=== 1950s ===
Date	Location	Dead	Injured	Total	Description
25 December 1959	London, England	0	4	4	An intoxicated man shot and wounded four people in Dagenham.
1 July 1959	Narborough, England	4	0	4	A man shot and killed his wife and two children before calling police to his residence and killing himself.
12 December 1958	Blackburn, England	2	2	4	A man shot and killed his wife and a police officer and wounded another officer before attempting suicide and being arrested.
29 September 1958	St Andrews, Scotland	4	0	4	Four people, including two children, were killed in a domestic murder–suicide.
20 December 1956	Chilgrove, England	5	0	5	A man shot and killed his wife and three children in a caravan at a farm before fatally shooting himself.
26 July 1956	London, England	4	0	4	A former criminal killed his wife, teenaged son, and daughter before shooting himself dead at their home in Haringey.
12 April 1956	London, England	0	4	4	A 14-year-old shot and wounded four other boys in Mill Hill.
24 August 1955	Manston, England	4	9	13	A United States Air Force airman opened fire at RAF Manston, killing two American comrades and a Royal Air Force airman. Nine others were wounded. The gunman fled to a hill near Broadstairs, where he engaged police before killing himself.
28 June 1954	Sidlesham, England	0	16	16	Sixteen people, including several children, were injured aboard a bus when a loaded shotgun accidentally discharged.
18 May 1954	London, England	2	2	4	An ex-soldier killed one person and wounded two others in a shooting spree before killing himself.
9 October 1952	Merseyside, England	2	2	4	Knowsley Hall shootings: A footman for John Stanley, 18th Earl of Derby shot four people at Knowsley Hall, including three staff and Lady Derby; two servants died. The gunman fled the scene, but was arrested in Liverpool.
11 July 1952	Rippingale, England	0	4	4	An agricultural worker wounded four other fruitpickers at a caravan site.
12 May 1951	Belfast, Northern Ireland	0	4	4	Three gunmen opened fire on a group of four men as they went home, wounding the four before running away.

=== 1940s ===
Date	Location	Dead	Injured	Total	Description
5 June 1947	Purfleet, England	4	1	5	A man sent his wife to a neighbour's residence before he shot and killed three of his daughters and wounded another. He was found with a self-inflicted gunshot wound and died two days later.
25 September 1946	Warrington, England	2	2	4	An intoxicated man returned with a gun after being expelled from a hotel bar and opened fire, fatally shooting a man and wounding two others before fatally shooting himself.
13 June 1945	London, England	4	0	4	A former soldier shot his wife and two daughters to death at their Islington home before killing himself.
2 March 1943	Newport, England	4	0	4	A Home Guard member used a rifle to kill his wife, son, and mother-in-law before killing himself.
11 November 1941	London, England	3	6	9	A man fatally shot three people and wounded six others as he drove around Chiswick firing randomly. He was arrested in Edgware.
17 May 1940	Oxford, England	1	3	4	A 19-year-old Oxford University student fired at other students from his window at University College, killing one student and wounding three others.
13 March 1940	London, England	1	3	4	An Indian assassin shot and killed former colonial administrator Michael O'Dwyer and wounded three others at Caxton Hall, Westminster.

=== 1930s ===
Date	Location	Dead	Injured	Total	Description
18 July 1938	Romiley, England	4	0	4	Four family members were fatally shot at their home. It was later determined that a man had shot and killed his wife and two children before killing himself.
11 August 1937	Glasgow, Scotland	5	1	6	A 30-year-old man shot and killed four people and wounded one other with a .25-caliber handgun before killing himself.
27 January 1937	near Worsthorne, England	4	0	4	A recently discharged farm worker killed three farm employees and himself with a shotgun.
11 August 1936	Lincoln, England	0	4	4	Three men and a woman were wounded on a housing estate. A man was arrested.
10 August 1935	Banbury, England	4	1	5	A man opened fire on a bus containing his wife and sister-in-law, killing them and another passenger before killing himself. Another person was wounded.
8 January 1934	Crook, England	4	0	4	A man shot at his family members, killing his son and daughter and fatally wounding his wife before he fatally shot himself.
28 May 1932	Cambridge, England	5	0	5	Five people were killed in a domestic murder–suicide.
26 February 1932	London, England	4	0	4	A man shot and killed his three daughters before fatally shooting himself at their home in Highgate.

=== 1920s ===
Date	Location	Dead	Injured	Total	Description
18 April 1929	Shenstone, England	4	0	4	A man killed two family members before fatally shooting a neighbor and himself.
13 April 1929	Marden, England	4	0	4	A man killed three family members and himself.
16 January 1927	London, England	4	0	4	A man shot and killed his two sons and his daughter before killing himself at their home in Barnes.
24 November 1926	near Broughton Mills, England	4	0	4	A man, his wife, and their two children were found dead inside their home. The man was found with a gun.
13 October 1926	Liverpool, England	0	4	4	A bank robber wounded four people as he attempted to escape the scene. He was arrested.
15 June 1925	London, England	4	0	4	A man killed his wife and two children before killing himself at their Willesden home.
27 December 1924	Staveley, England	2	2	4	A man shot and killed his mother and wounded his brother and sister before killing himself.
12 June 1924	North Uist, Scotland	4	0	4	A mentally ill man killed three family members and himself.
1 February 1924	Portsmouth, England	4	0	4	A man killed three family members with a shotgun before killing himself.
24 October 1920	Leeds, England	1	4	5	A man fired into a crowd inside a house in the Chapeltown neighborhood, wounding four before killing himself.
23 July 1920	Liverpool, England	1	3	4	One person was killed and three others wounded in a dispute.
21 June 1920	London, England	4	0	4	An estranged husband broke into his wife's residence and killed her, her sister, and a girl staying in the house who had alerted police. He then shot himself to death.

=== 1910s ===
Date	Location	Dead	Injured	Total	Description
24 July 1919	London, England	2	2	4	An estranged husband opened fire inside his wife's home, killing her and wounding two Australian soldiers who were lodging in her home. The gunman killed himself in the garden outside.
11 July 1916	Purton, England	2	3	5	A man opened fire on a woman and her three children, killing one of the children and injuring the others. He was later found dead of a self-inflicted gunshot wound.
17 September 1915	Edinburgh, Scotland	4	0	4	A man killed three family members before traveling to a social club and killing himself.
17 May 1914	Kingston upon Hull, England	3	1	4	A man killed three family members before attempting to kill himself.
9 May 1914	Burtonwood, England	0	5	5	A man shot at his neighbours during a dispute, wounding two women and three children. The gunman was arrested.
14 February 1914	Tonbridge, England	4	0	4	A man shot and killed his three children before killing himself.
20 December 1913	Brodsworth, England	0	4	4	On the estate of Brodsworth Hall, poachers opened fire on gamekeepers, wounding four of them.
10 July 1913	Lowestoft, England	2	2	4	A man wounded his ex-wife and her friend before shooting a man to death as he charged the shooter. The gunman then killed himself.
15 April 1913	Bedlington, England	3	1	4	A man shot and killed two police officers and a woman as they came to evict him. He fled the scene and was taken into custody after being shot by a civilian.
27 September 1912	London, England	3	2	5	A man opened fire at a hotel and on the street at pursuers, killing one person and wounding four others before being overpowered by civilians. One of the victims died in the hospital in October 1912 from his injuries, while another victim died in 1916 of tuberculosis resulting from his wounds.
19 August 1912	Eastbourne, England	3	1	4	Eastbourne Tragedy: Two days after killing his second wife and one child, a bigamist lured his first wife and two children to a rented house, where he killed the children and wounded his first wife. He then killed himself.
22 May 1912	Kingston upon Hull, England	1	3	4	A man wounded three people, including two police officers, before being found dead of a self-inflicted gunshot wound.
26 December 1910	Houndsditch, England	4	2	6	Houndsditch murders: A gang of burglars shot and killed three police officers and wounded two others. One of the gang was fatally wounded by shots from his compatriots in the process.

=== 1900s ===
Date	Location	Dead	Injured	Total	Description
18 August 1909	Gorleston-on-Sea, England	1	3	4	A man killed a constable before wounding three people as they attempted to intervene. He surrendered after his house was surrounded.
7 April 1909	St Blazey, England	0	4	4	A mentally ill man shot and wounded four people from his house. After a multi-day siege, he was arrested.
23 January 1909	Tottenham, England	4	21	25	Tottenham Outrage: Two criminals shot and killed two people and wounded twenty-one others during a two-hour police chase. The two thieves killed themselves at the end of the pursuit.
8 February 1908	Henley-on-Thames, England	5	0	5	A man shot and killed his wife, daughter, and two maids before killing himself.
13 August 1906	South Shields, England	4	0	4	A man fatally shot three family members before killing himself.
7 October 1905	near Horton, England	0	4	4	A man aimed a gun at a passing carriage and fired a shot when a passenger goaded him on, wounding four people. A miner was detained in connection with the shooting.
18 April 1905	Hightown, England	4	0	4	A man killed three family members and himself at their home.
2 April 1903	London, England	0	4	4	A man shot and wounded four people at random inside a lodging house in Whitechapel. The gunman was arrested and declared insane.
22 August 1901	Saltash, England	6	0	6	A man armed with a shotgun killed his wife and four children at their home before killing himself.
22 July 1901	London, England	4	0	4	A man killed three family members and himself.
19 May 1901	Charlton, England	5	1	6	A former soldier killed five of his children and wounded another before being arrested.

== 19th century ==
=== 1890s ===
Date	Location	Dead	Injured	Total	Description
8 December 1898	Criccieth, Wales	4	0	4	A man shot and killed his wife, two children and himself.
3 March 1898	London, England	0	5	5	After several children mocked an elderly man outside his home in Chiswick, the man took a shotgun and opened fire, wounding five boys. The shooter was arrested.
18 January 1896	Jarrow, England	2	2	4	A man shot and killed another man following an altercation at a pub, then fired at people in the street, shooting three people, one of whom died.
27 June 1895	Dundee, Scotland	0	4	4	A man struck and shot his wife during a domestic disturbance before shooting and injuring another woman and his daughter. He then injured a man who came to investigative by shooting and pistol-whipping him. As he attempted to shoot a police officer, the gunman's weapon malfunctioned, and he was arrested.
12 January 1894	London, England	1	3	4	A man shot and wounded three people in a botched robbery at a jewellery store before killing himself in the street.
15 August 1893	Dundee, Scotland	0	5	5	A man shot at his neighbours and responding police officers, wounding five people. He fatally stabbed a constable before being subdued and arrested.
7 August 1893	London, England	0	4	4	While hunting along the River Thames, a man shot and wounded four people in a passing boat.
22 February 1893	Scarva, Ireland	0	4	4	Two men shot into a crowd outside a country dance, wounding four people. The shooters were arrested.

=== 1880s ===
Date	Location	Dead	Injured	Total	Description
1 January 1888	Ramsgate, England	1	3	4	A man shot at two people in the street, missing them. He fired at people pursuing him, fatally shooting a man. He barricaded himself in his home and wounded three people outside, including the brother of the man killed. Police broke into the home and arrested the gunman.
24 August 1887	Pontypridd, Wales	1	13	14	A man shot into a crowd outside his house, killing another man and wounding thirteen other people.
28 July 1886	Penzance, England	4	0	4	A man shot and killed his sister, brother-in-law and a visitor before killing himself.
27 November 1884	Yateley, England	0	7	7	A man shot at Wellington College students on his land, wounding seven people.

=== 1840s ===
Date	Location	Dead	Injured	Total	Description
28 November 1848	Wymondham, England	2	2	4	Murders at Stanfield Hall: A man shot and killed two people and wounded two others at Stanfield Hall, near Wymondham.
26 August 1842	Glossop, England	0	4	4	During the 1842 general strike, a factory owner fired multiple guns at rioters outside his factory, wounding four of them.

== 18th century ==
=== 1730s ===
Date	Location	Dead	Injured	Total	Description
19 June 1734	near Helston, England	2	3	5	An under-sheriff with several constables and soldiers attempted to arrest a man, who opened fire, killing two men and wounding three others. They returned in March 1735, where the man shot and killed a bailiff and a soldier and then escaped. He was subsequently arrested and executed.

== See also ==
- List of mass stabbings in the United Kingdom
