= Dormers Wells High School shooting =

School shooting in England

- Location: 51.519699°N 0.366504°W; Dormers Wells High School, Southall, England
- Date: 11 November 1987; 10:00 p.m.
- Target: Mahraz Darshan Das (preacher)
- Attack type: Mass shooting, school shooting, assassination
- Weapons: .38-caliber revolver; Sawed-off shotgun; .22-caliber pistol
- Deaths: 3
- Injuries: 3 (including both perpetrators)
- Perpetrators: Rajinder Singh Batth; Mangit Singh Sunder
- Defenders: Jaga Singh; An unnamed man
- Convictions: Batth: murder, manslaughter, and malicious wounding Sunder: murder and manslaughter

On 11 November 1987, a school shooting occurred at Dormers Wells High School in Southall, London, England. Rajinder Singh Batth and Mangit Singh Sunder, two orthodox Sikhs, opened fire during a Sikh prayer meeting, targeting preacher Mahraz Darshan Das and then the congregation, killing three men and wounding one other. They were then subdued and treated for minor injuries at the hospital. In March 1989, both were sentenced to life imprisonment for murder and manslaughter, and have since been released.

== Shooting ==
On 11 November 1987, Batth and Sunder attended a prayer meeting held by Mahraz Darshan Das, 34, at Dormers Wells High School in Southall, London. Das was a preacher and self-styled Guru who was disliked by fundamentalist Sikhs for his moderate views. The perpetrators had attended several of Das' meetings beforehand. A witness recalled that Batth looked uncomfortable during one of them.

After making a statement, Das walked to the front of the stage to talk to the congregation. The two gunmen then stood up and moved towards him. Sunder yelled at him in Punjabi: "what's all this, you dog" before pulling out his sawed-off shotgun from under his coat and firing at Das, missing. Batth subsequently jumped up to the stage, retrieved his .38-caliber revolver from his waistband, and fatally shot Das in the back of the head at point-blank range. The bullet penetrated the back of his ear and ricocheted to his chest.

Afterwards, Batth turned and shot at the crowd. His bullets hit Satwant Singh Panesar, 41, and Dharan Singh Bimbrah, 53. Panesar died 11 days later while Bimbrah was discharged from the hospital on 20 November 1987.

Members of the crowd then rushed towards the gunmen to subdue them. A man tackled Batth and disarmed him without incident. 44-year-old Jaga Singh pushed Sunder to the ground, disarmed him, and punched him. However, Sunder pulled out his .22-caliber pistol and shot him in the abdomen. He died five hours later during surgery at Ealing Hospital.

The police and ambulances soon arrived. The shooters were arrested and then taken to the hospital to be treated for minor injuries inflicted on them by the congregation. A cassette tape used to record hymns and prayers captured audio of 38-second-long shooting.

== Perpetrators ==
Rajinder Singh Batth and Mangit Singh Sunder, both Londoners, were pro-Khalistan extremists upset with Das for his criticism of fundamentalist Sikhs and their wishes for an independent homeland in the Punjab. Both were members of fundamentalist groups within the International Sikh Youth Federation (ISYF). Batth, who was an unemployed 37-year-old, was considered the ringleader of the two. Sunder was 25-years-old and worked at a factory. Batth claimed he purchased their guns for €250 from a man outside of a Sikh temple in Handsworth three months before the shooting.

=== Legal proceedings ===
The perpetrators were both charged with three counts of murder, and Batth was also charged with malicious wounding in relation to Dharan Singh Bimbrah. The charges were later reduced to one count of murder and one count of manslaughter.

Halfway through the three-week-long trial, on 1 March 1989, Sunder pleaded guilty to the murder of Das and the manslaughter of Jaga Singh. Later that month, after deliberating for five hours, the jury found Batth guilty of Das's murder, the manslaughter of Singh, and malicious wounding. The judge sentenced both to life imprisonment, with the recommendation that Sunder serve at least 20 years and Batth serve at least 30 years.

Batth was released from prison in December 2021. He then returned to India and was honoured, along with his family, by jathedar Giani Harpreet Singh at the Akal Takht with siropas. Regarding the event, Batth said he was "lucky to be honoured at the Takht." Sunder has also been released.

== See also ==
- List of mass shootings in the United Kingdom
- Sikhism in the United Kingdom
