= USS S-29 =

S-class submarine of the United States

- USS S-29 (SS-134) visited Hawaii, in the summers of 1927, 1928, and 1930. She is seen here in June 1927.

History

United States
- Name: S-29
- Ordered: 4 March 1917
- Builder: Fore River Shipyard, Quincy, Massachusetts
- Cost: $677,622.75 (hull and machinery)
- Laid down: 17 April 1919
- Launched: 9 November 1922
- Sponsored by: Mrs. Ronan C. Grady
- Commissioned: 22 May 1924
- Decommissioned: 5 June 1942
- Stricken: 26 January 1946
- Identification: Hull symbol: SS-133; Call sign: NINT
- Fate: Transferred to the Royal Navy, 5 June 1942; Returned, 26 January 1946; Sold for scrap, 24 January 1947

United Kingdom
- Name: P556
- Acquired: 5 June 1942
- Fate: Returned to the U. Navy, 26 January 1946

General characteristics
- Class & type: S-18-class submarine
- Displacement: 930 long tons (945 t) surfaced; 1,094 long tons (1,112 t) submerged
- Length: 219 feet 3 inches (66.83 m)
- Beam: 20 ft 8 in (6.30 m)
- Draft: 17 ft 3 in (5.26 m)
- Installed power: 1,200 brake horsepower (895 kW) diesel; 2,375 hp (1,771 kW) electric
- Propulsion: 2 × NELSECO diesel engines; 2 × Ridgway Dynamo & Engine Company electric motors; 2 × 60-cell batteries; 2 × Propellers
- Speed: 14.5 knots (26.9 km/h; 16.7 mph) surfaced; 11 kn (20 km/h; 13 mph) submerged
- Range: 3,420 nmi (6,330 km; 3,940 mi) at 6.5 kn (12.0 km/h; 7.5 mph) surfaced; 8,950 nmi (16,580 km; 10,300 mi) at 9.5 kn (17.6 km/h; 10.9 mph) surfaced with fuel in main ballast tanks; 20 hours at 5 knots (9 km/h; 6 mph) submerged
- Test depth: 200 ft (61 m)
- Capacity: 41,921 US gallons (158,690 L; 34,907 imp gal) fuel oil
- Complement: 4 officers; 34 enlisted
- Armament: 4 × 21-inch (533 mm) torpedo tubes (12 torpedoes); 1 × 4-inch (102 mm)/50-caliber

USS S-29 (SS-134) was an S-18-class submarine, also referred to as an S-1-class or "Holland"-type, of the United States Navy. During World War II, she also served in the Royal Navy as HMS P556.

== Design ==
The S-18-class had a length of 219 feet 3 inches (66.8 m) overall, a beam of 20 ft 8 in (6.3 m), and a mean draft of 17 ft 3 in (5.3 m). They displaced 930 long tons (940 t) on the surface and 1,094 long tons (1,112 t) submerged. All S-class submarines had a crew of 4 officers and 34 enlisted men, when first commissioned. They had a diving depth of 200 ft (61.0 m).

For surface running, the S-18-class were powered by two 600-brake-horsepower (447 kW) NELSECO diesel engines, each driving one propeller shaft. When submerged each propeller was driven by a 1,175-horsepower (876 kW) Ridgway Dynamo & Engine Company electric motor. They could reach 14.5 knots (26.9 km/h; 16.7 mph) on the surface and 11 kn (20 km/h; 13 mph) underwater.

The boats were armed with four 21-inch (533 mm) torpedo tubes in the bow. They carried eight reloads, for a total of twelve torpedoes. The S-18-class submarines were also armed with a single 4 in (100 mm)/50 caliber deck gun.

== Construction ==
S-29's keel was laid down on 17 April 1919, by the Bethlehem Shipbuilding Corporation's Fore River Shipyard, in Quincy, Massachusetts. She was launched on 9 November 1922, sponsored by Mrs. Ronan C. Grady, and commissioned on 22 May 1924.

== Service history ==
=== U.S. Navy ===
After duties in the northeastern United States operating from New London, Connecticut, in 1924, S-29 visited the Territory of Hawaii, from 27 April to 30 May 1925. Operating mainly from Mare Island Navy Yard, San Diego, and San Pedro, California, until 1931, S-29 also served in the Panama Canal area from February to March 1926, visited Hawaii in the summers of 1927 and 1928, served in the Panama Canal area during February 1929, and again visited Hawaii during the summer of 1930.

Departing Mare Island, on 14 February 1931, S-29 arrived at Pearl Harbor, Hawaii, on 23 February 1931. S-29 then operated at Pearl Harbor, until 16 June 1939, when she departed bound for New London, which she reached on 23 August 1939. She then had duty in the northeastern United States and at Key West, Florida, from December 1940 to May 1941.

After the Japanese attack on Pearl Harbor, on 7 December 1941, brought the United States into World War II, S-29 moved to the Panama Canal area in late December 1941. In March 1942 she headed back to New London, where she arrived on 1 April 1942. She decommissioned there on 5 June 1942.

=== Royal Navy ===
On the day of her decommissioning, S-29 was transferred the United Kingdom. In the Royal Navy she became HMS P556. While in British service she suffered a battery explosion at Weymouth. The Royal Navy returned her to the US Navy on 26 January 1946.

== Fate ==
The US Navy struck S-29 from the Naval Vessel Register in 1946, and sold her in the United Kingdom, to H. G. Pound, on 24 January 1947, for scrapping. In 1982, her hulk, minus its conning tower, was still visible at the Pounds scrapyard near Portsmouth. She finally was scrapped in Spain, between 1986 and 1987.

== Awards ==
- American Defense Service Medal
- American Campaign Medal
- World War II Victory Medal

== Bibliography ==
- "Table 21 - Ships on Navy List June 30, 1919". Congressional Serial Set. U.S. Government Printing Office. 1921.
- Friedman, Norman (1995). U.S. Submarines Through 1945: An Illustrated Design History. Annapolis, Maryland: Naval Institute Press. ISBN 1-55750-263-3.
- Mohl, Michael. "S-29 (SS-134)". Navsource.net.
- "S-29". Dictionary of American Naval Fighting Ships. Navy Department, Naval History and Heritage Command. 1 September 2015. This article incorporates text from this source, which is in the public domain.
- Hall, Anne Martin (1925). Ships of the United States navy and their sponsors, 1913-1923.
- Hedman, Ric; Johnston, Dabid. "S-29".
- "USS S-29 (SS-134)". Archived from the original on 22 November 2010.
