= List of mass stabbings in the United Kingdom =

This is an incomplete list of mass stabbings in the United Kingdom. Examples of weapons which can be used in such attacks include bayonets, glass bottles, katanas, knives (such as kitchen knives or penknives), scissors and screwdrivers. As there is no single, widely accepted definition for how many casualties constitutes a mass stabbing, this article follows the general trend of attacks requiring four or more victims being stabbed.

== 2020s ==
Date	Location	Dead	Injured	Total	Description
31 October 2026	Chandler's Ford, Hampshire, England	0	5	5	Five boys aged 16 to 17 were stabbed at a Halloween party.
10 September 2026	London, England	0	4	4	Three teenagers and an adult male were stabbed at a KFC restaurant during an altercation. Eight people, including the four injured males, were charged.
5 August 2026	London, England	0	4	4	Four men were stabbed in the Covent Garden area of London. A 47-year-old woman was arrested.
19 June 2026	Edinburgh, Scotland	0	5	5	Five men have been injured in a series of suspected anti-Muslim attacks. A 36-year-old suspect was arrested.
8 April 2026	Tenby, Pembrokeshire, Wales	0	4	4	Four people were stabbed at Tenby railway station and later taken to hospital. A 16-year-old and 19-year-old were arrested on suspicion of assault with intent.
30 December 2025	Newton-le-Willows, Merseyside, England	0	5	5	A man attacked five people with a crowbar after being denied an appointment at Newton Community Hospital.
25–26 December 2025	Glasgow, Scotland	1	3	4	A man was stabbed to death and three others injured in a series of knife attacks.
30 November 2025	Altrincham, Greater Manchester, England	0	4	4	A man was charged after two men were stabbed and two other people assaulted in Altrincham town centre.
1 November 2025	Huntingdon, Cambridgeshire, England	0	11	11	Main article: 2025 Cambridgeshire train stabbing 11 passengers on a moving train were stabbed and taken to hospital before arriving at Huntingdon station.
28 July 2025	Bermondsey, London, England	2	2	4	Two men were killed and another two were injured following a stabbing at a business; one of the injured was subsequently arrested.
17 May 2025	Thamesmead, London, England	0	5	5	Five men were stabbed during a fight at a music event; all of them were subsequently arrested.
23 January 2025	Beddington, London, England	0	5	5	Five people were injured after being stabbed at a warehouse.
29 July 2024	Southport, Merseyside, England	3	10	13	Main article: 2024 Southport stabbings Three children were killed and 10 people, eight of whom were children, injured after a teenager attacked a children's Taylor Swift-themed dance and yoga event.
30 April 2024	Hainault, London, England	1	4	5	Main article: 2024 Hainault sword attack A 14-year-old boy was killed and four other people injured after a man crashed his vehicle into a house before walking around stabbing people.
27 December 2023	Liverpool, England	0	4	4	Four people were stabbed or suffered lacerations during a disturbance.
5 November 2023	London, England	0	4	4	Four people were stabbed in an incident during Bonfire Night celebrations near Waltham Forest Town Hall.
30 April 2023	Bodmin, Cornwall, England	1	7	8	One man was killed and seven other people injured after an altercation outside a nightclub in Bodmin.
13 February 2023	Walthamstow, London, England	0	4	4	Four men were injured, one critically, after a machete attack at a pub.
5 November 2022	Portsmouth, Hampshire, England	0	4	4	Four men were stabbed outside a nightclub in Portsmouth.
25 April 2022	Bermondsey, London, England	4	0	4	Main article: 2022 Bermondsey stabbing Four people were killed in a three-bedroomed terraced house.
31 October 2021	Bristol, England	0	5	5	Five people were stabbed during a large fight.
1 October 2021	West End, London, England	0	4	4	A man attacked four people with a hammer and sexually assaulted two of them before being subdued by bystanders.
17 March 2021	Belfast, Northern Ireland	0	5	5	Five people were injured during a stabbing attack in Belfast city centre.
6 September 2020	Birmingham, England	1	7	8	A man with schizophrenia killed a man and injured seven others during a series of seemingly random knife attacks.
23 August 2020	Salford, Greater Manchester, England	0	4	4	After his girlfriend disputed with another woman at a pub, a man stabbed that woman and three men who intervened.
26 July 2020	Moss Side, Manchester, England	1	3	4	Main article: 2020 Manchester stabbing Four people were stabbed, one fatally, in an incident which occurred as a result of a gangland feud. The attackers were armed with a knife, machete and imitation handgun.
26 June 2020	Glasgow, Scotland	0	6	6	Main article: Glasgow hotel stabbings Six people, including a police officer, were seriously injured when a man stabbed them at the Park Inn Hotel in Glasgow's city centre.
20 June 2020	Reading, Berkshire, England	3	3	6	Main article: 2020 Reading stabbings A man armed with a kitchen knife attacked six people in Forbury Gardens, killing three and seriously injuring three others.
5 May 2020	Penygraig, Rhondda Cynon Taf, Wales	1	3	4	A woman stabbed four people, killing an 88-year-old man, at a Co-op Food supermarket.
12 January 2020	Manchester, England	0	5	5	A man with a knife attacked homeless people at random, wounding five.
9 January 2020	March, Cambridgeshire, England	0	5	5	Four prison officers and a nurse were injured with improvised weapons by two Islamic extremist prisoners at HM Prison Whitemoor.

== 2010s ==
Date	Location	Dead	Injured	Total	Description
29 November 2019	City of London, London, England	2	3	5	Main article: 2019 London Bridge stabbings A man armed with two kitchen knives stabbed multiple people inside Fishmongers' Hall and on the north side of London Bridge.
11 October 2019	Manchester, England	0	5	5	Five people were injured, one seriously, after a man started attacking people at the Arndale Centre in Manchester.
25 August 2019	Maidstone, Kent, England	1	3	4	A teenager stabbed four people at a MoStack concert, killing a man.
27 November 2018	Edmonton, London, England	0	4	4	Four men were found with stab wounds following a fight apparently related to a shooting which happened the day before.
11 March 2018	Saintfield, County Down, Northern Ireland	0	4	4	A man stabbed four people at a house.
23 December 2017	Sheffield, South Yorkshire, England	0	4	4	Four people were stabbed during a brawl at a nightclub.
23 August 2017	Penistone, South Yorkshire, England	0	4	4	A man attacked his four children with a hammer, severely injuring them, then crashed his car into a pub.
3 June 2017	Southwark, London, England	6	48	54	Main article: 2017 London Bridge attack Three attackers armed with ceramic knives killed six people and injured 48, 21 critically, in the Borough Market area in central London.
4 March 2017	Bristol, England	0	4	4	Four people were stabbed during a large fight outside a popular nightclub in Bristol.
20 May 2016	Hampton, London, England	0	4	4	A man stabbed four women in a Sainsbury's car park during a psychotic episode.
21 August 2016	Bristol, England	0	5	5	A man stabbed five people at two nightclubs.
3 August 2016	Bloomsbury, London, England	1	5	6	Main article: 2016 Russell Square stabbing A man killed one person and injured five others, one seriously, in a stabbing attack in Russell Square.
4 October 2015	Slough, Berkshire, England	0	4	4	Four people sustained stab wounds at a house.
13 December 2013	Luton, Bedfordshire, England	0	4	4	Four people were injured during a knife fight at a birthday party.
13 October 2013	Begwary, Bedfordshire, England	0	4	4	Four people were stabbed at a party.
2 June 2012	Thornton Heath, London, England	0	5	5	Five people were stabbed during a disturbance.
19 November 2011	Kingsbury, London, England	0	4	4	Four police officers were stabbed while responding to a disturbance.
14 August 2011	St Helier, Jersey	6	1 (the perpetrator)	7	Main article: Rzeszowski family homicides A man armed with two kitchen knives killed six people, including four members of his family, before repeatedly stabbing himself in the chest.
29 April 2011	Wootton, Northamptonshire, England	4	0	4	Main article: Ding family murders Four people, all members of the same family, were found stabbed to death at their home on 1 May 2011.

== 2000s ==
Date	Location	Dead	Injured	Total	Description
20 August 2009	Keighley, West Yorkshire, England	0	7	7	A man suffering from delusions stabbed seven people after worsening his condition with alcohol and drugs.
17 August 2009	Bristol, England	0	10	10	A man with a Swiss Army knife stabbed ten people, including several police officers, on a cycle path in Easton.
1 February 2009	Glasgow, Scotland	0	4	4	Four men were stabbed at a pub.
August 2008	Motherwell, Lanarkshire, Scotland	0	4	4	A man stabbed four people with scissors after being expelled from a nightclub.
24 May 2008	Sidcup, London, England	1	4	5	A man with two kitchen knives stabbed actor Rob Knox to death and wounded four other people outside a bar.
12 February 2007	Caledon, County Tyrone, Northern Ireland	0	4	4	A man stabbed a person inside a store, then injured three other people outside in random attacks.
13 November 2006	Newcastle upon Tyne, England	4	0	4	A man used a knife to kill his two children, his ex-partner, and her brother.
4 November 2006	Mitcham, London, England	1	3	4	Four people were stabbed, one fatally, during a gang brawl.
26 January 2005	Paisley/Renfrew, Renfrewshire, Scotland	0	6	6	A man injured six people with a knife in a series of attacks.
24 December 2004	Lewisham, London, England	0	4	4	A man stabbed four people inside and outside a bar.
23 December 2004	North London, England	1	5	6	A man killed one person and critically injured five others after "rampaging" through the Green Lanes area of London.
4 April 2003	Bristol, England	0	6	6	A man stabbed six people in random attacks, one of whom he also robbed.
14 January 2003	Crumpsall, Greater Manchester, England	1	4	5	Main article: Murder of Stephen Oake Five police officers were stabbed, one fatally, in a flat during an immigration operation by terrorist Kamel Bourgass who had participated in the Wood Green ricin plot.
3 November 2002	Slough, Berkshire, England	0	4	4	A gang of men stabbed and cut four people.

== 1990s ==
Date	Location	Dead	Injured	Total	Description
28 November 1999	Thornton Heath, London, England	0	12 (including the perpetrator)	12	A schizophrenic man attacked 11 worshippers at a church in Thornton Heath with a katana after hearing voices which told him they were demons.
10 November 1999	Edgware, London, England	0	4	4	A man stabbed four people and threatened another with a knife in a series of attacks.
July 1998	Soho, London, England	0	5	5	A restaurant worker stabbed five colleagues with a meat knife.
10 May 1998	Rutherglen, Scotland	0	4	4	A 17-year-old Rangers fan stabbed four rival Celtic fans during scuffles after Celtic won the Premier Division.
8 July 1996	Wolverhampton, West Midands, England	0	7	7	Main article: Wolverhampton machete attack A man broke into a preschool and began attacking children and adults alike at random before being tackled and disarmed. He was later found insane.
April 1996	Kilbirnie, Ayrshire, Scotland	0	4	4	A schizophrenic man stabbed his father, then injured three strangers in a series of attacks.
2 January 1996	Bexleyheath, London, England	0	4	4	A mentally ill woman with four knives and five screwdrivers injured four people at a Jobcentre location.
28 December 1995	Bordesley Green, Birmingham, England	1	9	10	A man with two knives stabbed ten people in a Netto supermarket, killing one.
28 August 1995	Moreton, Merseyside, England	0	5	5	A man randomly stabbed five people, including three teenagers, as he walked through the streets of Moreton.
7 August 1995	Birkenhead, Merseyside, England	0	6	6	A man kicked out of a nightclub injured six people in a stabbing.
29 April 1995	Birmingham, England	0	5	5	Five men were wounded by a man with a knife at a nightclub.
8 December 1994	Birmingham, England	0	15	15	Main article: Rackhams knife attack A man injured 15 women, three seriously, with a butcher knife and a bread knife in a Rackhams department store.
February 1994	Oldham, Greater Manchester, England	0	4	4	A man stabbed four people in a housing estate before being tackled and detained by a police officer.
January 1994	Cardiff, Wales	1	3	4	A man attacked his neighbours with a knife, killing one and wounding three.
12 October 1992	Witham, Essex, England	0	4	4	A man armed with a knife and claw hammer attacked people at random, injuring four.
9 August 1992	Harlow, Essex, England	1	3	4	A man was killed and three other people wounded in a stabbing at a birthday party hosted at Princess Alexandra Hospital.
2 September 1991	Wood Green, London, England	0	4	4	A man stabbed four police officers at the Wood Green Shopping City shopping centre.

== 1980s ==
Date	Location	Dead	Injured	Total	Description
10 November 1989	Burton upon Trent, Staffordshire, England	0	5	5	A man stabbed five people at random as they walked past him in the street.

== 1970s ==
Date	Location	Dead	Injured	Total	Description
17 June 1972	London/Orpington, England	0	4	4	A man armed with a knife and iron bar threatened members of the public at several different train stations and injured a postman and three railway staff members.
17 February 1972	Blackpool, Lancashire, England	3	3	6	A doctor at Blackpool Victoria Hospital stabbed three children to death and injured a fourth child and two employees in a children's ward.

== See also ==
- Knife crime in the United Kingdom
- List of mass shootings in the United Kingdom
