= DWHS =

DWHS may refer to:

- DeLand-Weldon High School, Piatt County, Illinois, United States
- Desert Winds High School, Casa Grande, Arizona, United States
- Dormers Wells High School, Ealing, London, England
