= Monkseaton shootings =

1989 mass shooting in Tyne & Wear, England

- Location: Monkseaton, Tyne & Wear, England
- Date: 30 April 1989 c. 11:40 – c. 12:00
- Attack type: Mass shooting, murder, spree shooting
- Weapon: 12-bore double-barreled shotgun
- Deaths: 1
- Injuries: 16
- Perpetrator: Robert Sartin

The Monkseaton shootings occurred on 30 April 1989 in Monkseaton, Tyne & Wear, England, when Robert Sartin killed one man and left 16 other people injured during a 20-minute shooting spree.

== Shootings ==
Sartin, a 22-year-old clerk, took his father's double-barrelled shotgun and climbed into a car outside his parents' home at around 11:40 BST. Witnesses described how Sartin fired indiscriminately at people.

Judith Rhodes was driving along nearby Pykerley Road. As she drove along she noticed a figure dressed entirely in black. She then noticed the double-barrelled shotgun that the man was pointing at her. The first shot shattered the windscreen while the second shot struck her hand; the man then walked calmly away. Lorraine Noble, 39, was then shot as she fled from Sartin on Windsor Road. Joan and James Kernaghan, and their neighbour, William Dack, were all shot at as they stood chatting in the street. Kenneth Mackintosh was killed when he was shot twice in the back Windsor Road. Robert Wilson, 38, was shot in the face and back, sustaining 60 pellet wounds of which 50 could not be removed.

Sartin next fired at Kathleen Lynch through her window, injuring her shoulder. On Eastfield Avenue, Sartin then shot at Brian Thomas, 39. Vera Burrows, 75, spoke with Sartin at her door on Eastfield Avenue, and asked him what he was doing. He replied, "It's me. I am killing people. I am going to kill you." But when he pointed the gun at her he continued: "Oh, you are old. I won't kill you," and walked away.

William Reynolds was shot in the back and neck before Peter and Jean Burgon were shot in their car. Kathleen Myley, 64, was then shot after she left church. Ernest Carter was shot in the back of the legs. Roy Brown was then injured when Sartin fired through the windscreen of his car. Jean Miller, 69, was in her garden on Brantwood Avenue when Sartin shot her in the stomach.

After firing his final shot, Sartin got into his car and drove to Whitley Bay. An unarmed police officer in an unmarked police car heard a radio call about the shootings and followed Sartin's car at 60 miles per hour (97 km/h). Sartin was arrested in a Whitley Bay car park when he emerged from the car without his gun.

== Aftermath ==
Sartin was charged with Mackintosh's murder as well as 16 counts of attempted murder. In May 1996, he appeared at Durham Crown Court where he pleaded not guilty by reason of insanity and he was subsequently detained indefinitely at a secure mental unit.

== See also ==
- List of massacres in Great Britain
- List of rampage killers
- List of mass shootings in the United Kingdom

== Sources ==
- Cawthorne, Nigel; Tibballs, Geoff (1994) [1993]. Killers: The Ruthless Exponents of Murder. London: Boxtree. ISBN 0-752-20850-0.
- Lane, Brian (1995). Chronicle of 20th Century Murder. Wiltshire: Select Editions. ISBN 978-0-425-14649-1.
