= Murder of Mary Money =

Victim of an unsolved murder

Mary Money
- Born: Mary Sophia Money; England
- Died: 24 September 1905
Children
Murder of Mary Money
- Location: 51.274°N 0.152°W

Mary Sophia Money is the victim of an unsolved murder in Surrey, England, from 1905.

== Discovery of body ==
Her body was found in Merstham tunnel by sub-Inspector William Peacock shortly before 11pm on 24 September 1905. He was the foreman of a gang of workmen. Her remains were quite mutilated and there were no identifying papers, letters or a ticket on her. Peacock immediately reported his discovery to the Merstham station master. The workmen brought her body to the station, where police directed them to bring it to The Feathers Inn.

== Investigation ==
Initially, her death was thought to be a suicide, but the discovery of a scarf thrust down her throat and marks on the walls of the tunnel changed this opinion. After her description was circulated, her brother, Robert Money, a dairy farmer from Kingston Hill, came forward the following day to identify her as his sister.

=== Last known movements ===
She had worked for a dairyman named Bridger and lived in Lavender Hill in Battersea, south London. She shared accommodation with another dairy employee, Emma Hone, who had last seen her at 7pm the day of her death when she said she was going for a walk and would not be long. Emma did not know of any boyfriends of Mary.

Miss Golding, who owned a sweetshop near Clapham Junction railway station, said that Mary had bought some chocolate and mentioned that she was going to Victoria station. A ticket collector identified her as a woman he had seen at about 7:20pm and that she had said she was going to Victoria – he was the last person known to have seen her alive. Mary had a purse with her when she left Clapham, which was never found.

A young man, a railway clerk who had dated Mary, had an alibi for the time of her death. Her employer and his brother said that they had been on good terms with her until her death.

=== Possible sightings ===
A guard on the train said that he had seen a man and woman together in a first class compartment at East Croydon and that she matched Mary's description. He saw them again at South Croydon railway station and, at Redhill, he saw the man leave what he thought was the same compartment and exit the train. He was described as thin, with a moustache and a bowler hat, a description that did not help identify him and he was never traced.

A signalman at Purley Oaks said that he had seen a man and woman struggling in a first class compartment, but he had not attached much importance to it.

==== Train ====
A 9.33 train from London Bridge passed through the tunnel around the time of her death.

=== Expert witness evidence ===
A Home Office expert said that her injuries had been sustained before death, probably because of a violent struggle, that she had been dead approximately one hour when found and that there was no sign of sexual interference. The autopsy showed that she had eaten a meal about three hours before her death.

== Motive ==
In 1912 a review of her case revealed a possible motive: "...The interest of the connection is that this sister also accounted for a display out of keeping with her position by false statements of an engagement with her employer. At her death it was discovered she had misappropriated the firm's money." (The connection noted was the tentative identification of her brother Robert Money as the infamous biagmist/murderer Robert Hicks Murray it was felt that Robert Money had been living an life of extravagance before his 1912 murders/suicide-although he was not a suspect in his sister’s murder.

== See also ==
- List of unsolved murders in the United Kingdom
