= Horden shooting =

2012 mass shooting in England

- Location: Horden, County Durham, England, UK
- Date: 1 January 2012
- Attack type: Mass shooting, murder–suicide
- Weapon: Shotgun
- Deaths: 4 (including the perpetrator)
- Injuries: 1
- Perpetrator: Michael Atherton

The Horden shooting was a mass shooting in Horden, England, on 1 January 2012, also called the New Year's Day shooting. 42-year-old Michael Atherton shot his partner Susan McGoldrick, her sister Alison Turnbull and her daughter Tanya Turnbull with a shotgun, before killing himself. They were all killed in Atherton's home, where three others escaped from an upstairs window, one of whom had suffered minor injuries from the spray of the gun.

== Background ==
Michael Atherton, a taxi driver, had a licence which allowed him to legally own firearms, six in total – three of which were shotguns. Despite having his guns confiscated in 2008 by the police, they were later returned.

He was arrested for affray at a local club, and months later armed police were called to his home after he threatened to "blow his head off" to his family.

== See also ==
- Cumbria shootings
- List of massacres in Great Britain
- List of mass shootings in the United Kingdom
- Plymouth shooting
