= Merstham tunnels =

Coordinates: 51.274°N 0.152°W

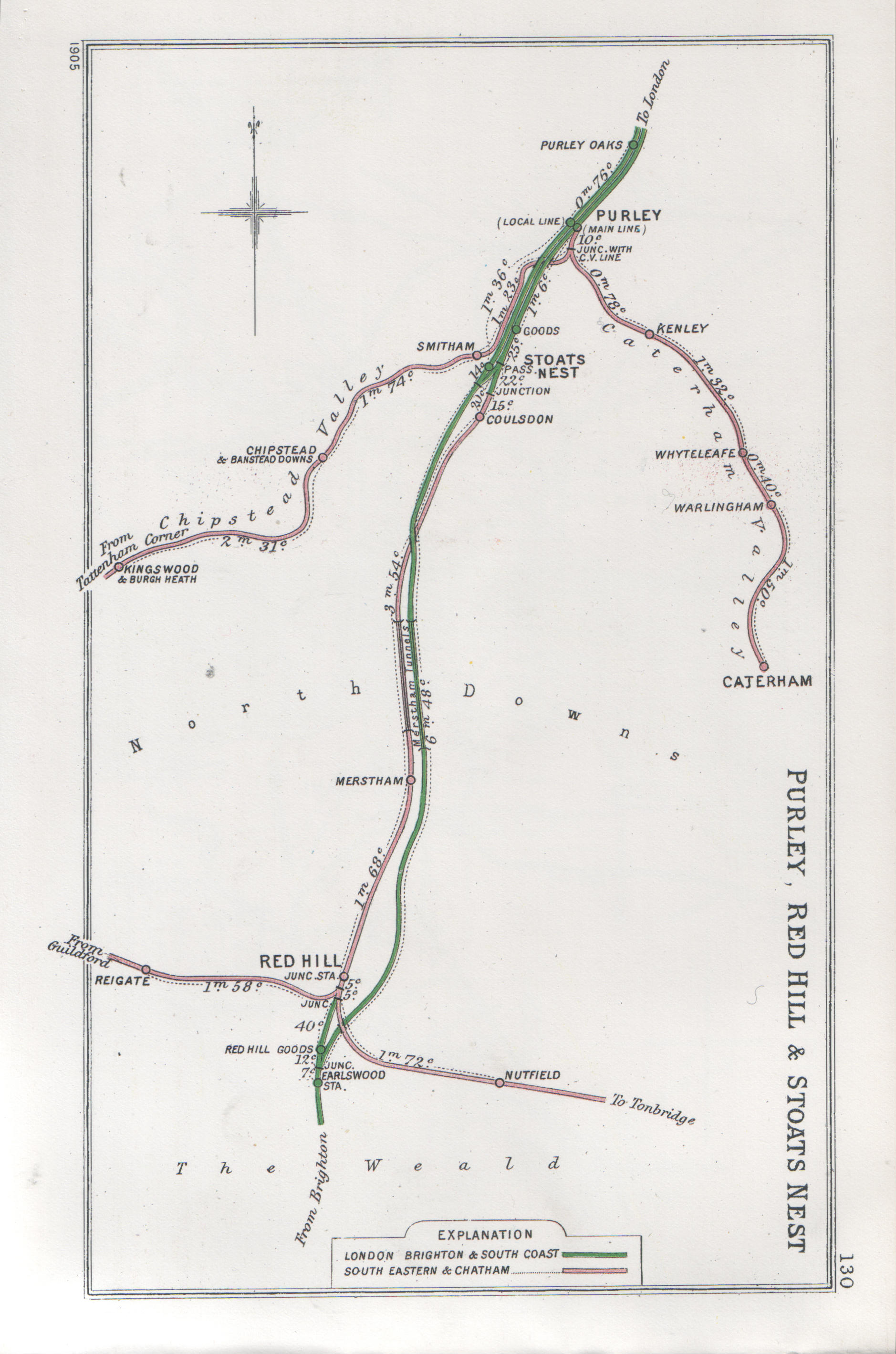
The relative position of the two Merstham tunnels

The Merstham and Quarry tunnels are two neighbouring railway tunnels on the Brighton Main Line between Merstham and Coulsdon (formerly Stoats Nest) in Surrey, Great Britain.

The Merstham Tunnel was the first to be built, with construction commencing in 1838 and being opened on 12 July 1841. Built by the London and Brighton Railway (L&BR), it formed a key element of the original route between London and Brighton. Nearly sixty years after the Merstham Tunnel's completion, the Quarry Tunnel was built amid tensions between the South Eastern Railway (SER) and the London Brighton and South Coast Railway (LB&SCR). The Quarry Tunnel bypasses the SER stations of Coulsdon South, Merstham and Redhill, and thus has been mostly used by fast trains, while the Merstham Tunnel is used by stopping services instead.

On 24 September 1905, the Merstham Tunnel was the location of the first murder on Britain's railways, that being of Mary Sophia Money. Both tunnels were electrified via the installation of a third rail system by the Southern Railway during 1932, after which the route has been largely used by electric traction. Both tunnels have continued to be used through to the present day.

== Merstham Tunnel ==
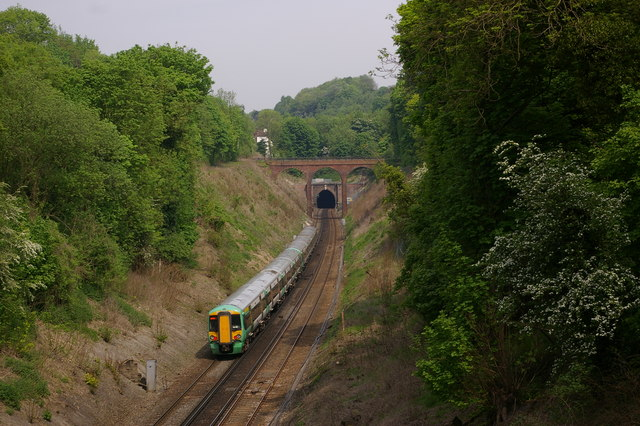
The south portal of Merstham Tunnel, 2008. Arched bridge is Joliffe Road. Note the British Rail Class 377 passing through

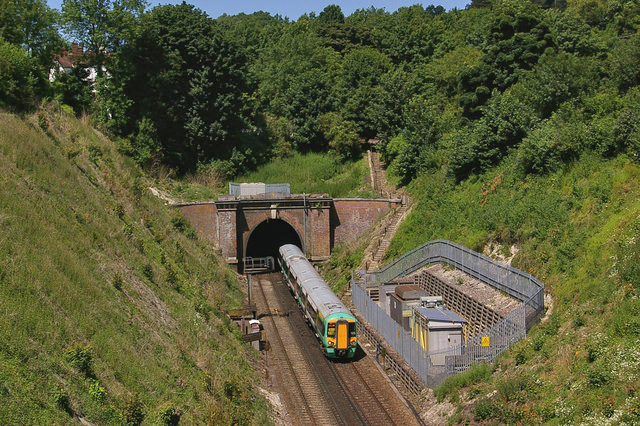
The south portal of Merstham Tunnel, 2008

The original tunnel through the North Downs was constructed for the London and Brighton Railway (L&BR), forming a key element for conveying rail traffic between London and Brighton. Prior to construction commencing, a total of six routes, including two via the Merstham Gap, was considered; the selected route, chosen after a formal Parliamentary enquiry, was reportedly unexpected to be successful. Even still, the route was modified somewhat allegedly on the account of objections raised by of local landowners. A surveying platform was completed in August 1838 to assist the construction; it remains in-situ to the present day.

During 1838, work on Merstham Tunnel commenced under the supervision of the engineer John Urpeth Rastrick, and was completed within two years. It was bored through chalk, and featured a total of twelve vertical shafts, up which the spoil was raised to the surface in skips by means of horse-drawn winches. Originally, the tunnel had been intended to have a length of 2,013 yards (1,841 metres, or 1.14 miles), but it was realigned midway though construction, shortening it to 1,830 yards (1,673 metres or 1.04 miles) long. The two-mile railway cutting to the north of the tunnel is reportedly one of the largest in Europe having a depth of 100 feet (30 metres) at the northern entrance to the tunnel. Its construction involved the removal of more than a million cubic yards (800,000 cubic metres) of chalk.

Brick-lined portals were built at each end of the tunnel. An unusual measure, which was intended to boost the travelling public's perception of its safety, the interior of the tunnel was whitewashed and lit by gas lamps, the latter being supplied from a small gas works south of Merstham station. However, this practice was soon abandoned as the large quantities of soot emitted by steam locomotives prevented effective illumination of the tunnel anyway. On 12 July 1841, the Merstham Tunnel was officially opened to traffic. At the time of its completion, it was considered to be an engineering marvel of the era.

Although the tunnel was built by the L&BR, it was located on a section of line between Croydon and Redhill that was to be shared with the South Eastern Railway (SER), when they commenced services on their route to Dover in 1842. On 16 July 1844, the SER refunded half of the construction cost of the joint line and took ownership of the section between Purley and Redhill, including the Merstham Tunnel.

On 24 September 1905, the Merstham Tunnel was the site of the unsolved murder of Mary Sophia Money; the incident is believed to be the first murder on a train anywhere in Britain. Shortly after the incident, marks were discovered on the tunnel wall, indicating that Miss Money had been involved in a violent struggle and had been thrown to her death from a moving train.

On 29 January 1989, a passenger train collided with an out-of-gauge engineering train travelling on the opposite line inside Merstham Tunnel; damage was sustained to the passenger train's traction equipment along with several smashed windows.

== Quarry Tunnel ==
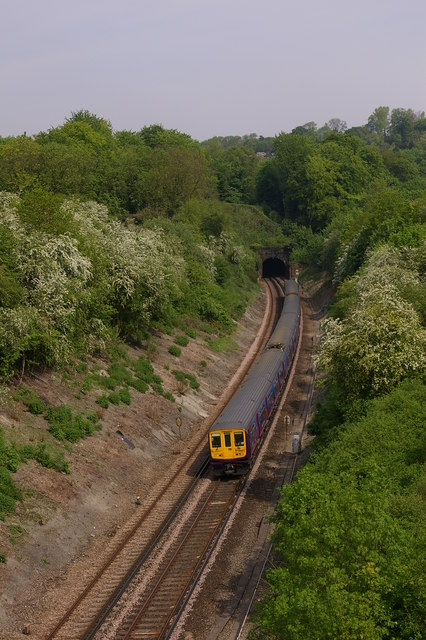
The south portal of Quarry Tunnel, 2008. A British Rail Class 319 is passing through

The sharing of the main line caused a great deal of friction between the SER and the London Brighton and South Coast Railway (LB&SCR), the successor of the L&BR, throughout the 19th century. Eventually, the LB&SCR gained Parliamentary approval to build its own independent line between Coulsdon North and Earlswood, which bypassed the SER stations of Coulsdon South, Merstham and Redhill. This involved the construction of a second tunnel to the east of the original, and 25 feet (7.6 metres) above the level of the original. Since both routes form part of the Brighton Main Line, in order to differentiate them the former was called the "Redhill Line", whilst the new line became known as the "Quarry Line".

Quarry Tunnel is 2,113 yards (1,932 metres, or about 1.2 miles or 1 mile 1.6 chains) in length. It was constructed between 1896 and 1899, being formally opened on 8 November 1899. The contractors were Messrs Firbank, and the estimated cost was £85,000. The new tunnel was approached by a 100 ft deep cutting on the north side. Both Quarry Tunnel and the original Merstham Tunnel have been operated through to the twenty-first century; while the former is predominantly used by fast trains, services that stop at Redhill and Merstham have instead continued to use the older Merstham Tunnel.

== Electrification ==
During 1932, the lines through both tunnels, along with the wider route, were electrified via the installation of a third rail system by the Southern Railway.
