= Neil Rutherford =

British Royal Navy officer (1922–1976)

- Born: 15 May 1922
- Died: 24 September 1976 (aged 54); Penmaenmawr, Wales
- Military career
- Allegiance: United Kingdom
- Branch: Royal Navy
- Service years: 1936–1959
- Rank: Lieutenant Commander
- Commands: Commander-in-Chief, The Nore
- Conflicts: World War II: East Indies; Southwest Pacific; Korean War
- Awards: DSC

Lt Cmdr Neil Rutherford, DSC, (15 May 1922 – 24 September 1976) was a British Royal Navy commander and mass murderer. He saw active service in the Second World War and the Korean War. In 1958 he served with the Underwater Weapons Material Dept. He committed suicide in Penmaenmawr, Wales, after killing four people at a hotel and setting it on fire.

== Naval career ==
- Midshipman 1 January 1940
- Sub Lieutenant 1 November 1941
- Lieutenant 1 June 1943
- Lieutenant Commander 1 June 1951 (General List 1 January 1957) (retired 5 January 1959)
- DSC 10 July 1945 6 war patrols (3 East Indies, 3 Southwest Pacific)
- DSC 29 June 1951 Korea

== Naval service ==
- Education: RN College (January 1936 – December 1939)
- 1 January 1940 – January HMS Glasgow (cruiser)
- January 1941 – May 1941 HMS Hero (destroyer)
- May 1941 – July 1941 HMS Valiant (battleship)
- July 1941? – September 1941? passage home SS Empress of Asia
- September 1941 – March 1942 Sub-Lieutenant's courses
- March 1942 – May 1942 submarine training course
- 20 May 1942 – February 1943 HMS Tuna which was involved in Operation Frankton
- February 1943 – July 1943 HMS P556 (submarine)
- 5 July 1943 – January 1946 First Lieutenant HMS Spiteful patrolling the Pacific sinking Japanese shipping.
- 8 February 1946 – August 1946 HMS Dolphin a shore-establishment depot for submarines. Part of Submarine Reserve Group K.
- August 1946 – September 1946 HMS Stygian (submarine)
- October 1946 – November 1946 HMS Ranee (Woolworth carrier)
- January 1947 – January 1948 specialist Torpedo & Anti-Submarine (TAS) course HMS Vernon
- January 1948 – September 1949 HMS Defiance a torpedo school.
- September 1949 – November 1949 passage to Far East SS Devonshire
- November 1949 – April 1952? HMS Black Swan (sloop) which was involved in the Yangtze Incident on 20 April 1949 (Korea; possibly POW)
- 30 April 1952 – (May 1953) staff TAS, HMS Montclare a Submarine Depot Ship and based at Rothesay with the 3rd Submarine flotilla.
- May 1953 – 5 July 1954 Commander-in-Chief, The Nore
- 5 July 1954 – (January 1956) staff, Flag Officer Commanding Reserve Fleet HMS Cleopatra
- (1958) Underwater Weapons Material Department (Bath), Admiralty HMS President

== Family life ==
Commander Rutherford retired from the navy 5 January 1959. He was son of Neil Perry Rutherford and after his father's death, Neil ran A. Rutherford and Co, until 1960s. By April 1975, he was working as a gardener/handyman at the Red Gables Hotel, Penmaenmawr, North Wales. Rutherford was married on 7 August 1948 to Joan Margery Colville-Hyde; they divorced 2 May 1972.

== Killings and suicide ==
Rutherford killed four people at the Red Gables Hotel in Penmaenmawr, Wales, on 24 September 1976, set fire to the hotel and then committed suicide. Killed by gunshot wounds were the hotel owner, Linda Simcox (59); Simcox's daughter, Lorna (24) and her husband, Alistair McIntyre (33); and a former merchant seaman who had become an antique dealer and resident of Baton Rouge, Louisiana,^{A} Johnny Gore Green (55). The hotel was ablaze when the police arrived. An inquest a month later found that Rutherford had been the gardener and handyman at the hotel and concluded that the murders were made in a jealous rage after Rutherford made overtures toward Linda Simcox who "did not reciprocate these feelings".

== Notes ==
A.Some sources claim Green was from Bay City, Texas.
