= Penmaenmawr Killings =

Welsh mass shooting

- Location: Penmaenmawr, Conwy County Borough, Wales
- Date: 24 September 1976; 50 years ago 20:30
- Attack type: Mass Murder, Mass Shooting, Murder-Suicide, Arson
- Weapon: Semi-automatic pistol
- Deaths: 5 (including the perpetrator)
- Injuries: 0
- Perpetrator: Neil Rutherford
- Motive: Revenge for perceived sexual rejection

The Penmaenmawr Killings was a mass murder at the Red Gables Hotel in Penmaenmawr, Conwy County Borough, Wales, on 24 September 1976. The perpetrator, Neil Rutherford, killed 4 people as well as burned the hotel down before he committed suicide. It is Wales' deadliest mass murder.

== Background ==
The Red Gables Hotel was built as a private summer residence in 1885. Eventually, it became popular with visitors. At the time of the murders, Linda Simcox was the owner of the hotel and had been for the past 5 years. Simcox used to live in Lancashire before moving in 1965. She had four sons and two daughters between the two marriages she had been in.

== The shooting ==
Armed with a Semi-automatic pistol, Rutherford, 54, shot and killed 4 people on the night of November 24 1976; the names of the victims were:

- Linda Simcox, 59, owner of the hotel. She was murdered in the lounge of the hotel.
- Lorna McIntyre, 24, one of Linda Simcox's daughters. Lorna was in the early stages of pregnancy. She was murdered in an upstairs bedroom.
- Alistair McIntyre, 33, Scottish husband of Lorna McIntyre. He was shot somewhere inside the house but managed to crawl his way out to the street before he died.
- John Gore Green, 55, a family friend and only visitor in the hotel at the time from Bay City, Texas, United States.^{A} He was murdered in the kitchen.

Rutherford then lit the hotel on fire and killed himself in the lounge by Simcox's body.

== Perpetrator ==
Lt Cmdr Neil Rutherford, DSC, was the perpetrator. He was a Lieutenant Commander in the British Royal Navy, he retired on the 5th of January 1959 after 19 years of service. In April of 1975, he became the gardener for the hotel. He was known locally as the "commander". He was known in most public spaces in Penmaenmawr. Locals who knew him described him as a "quiet man who always drank alone". Others said that he was a fidgety man who "would never sit down". On the afternoon of the shooting, Rutherford was drinking at the Mountain View Hotel. According to one man, he was his normal self, "he was on his own and was pacing up and down like he usually did".

An inquest a month later concluded that Rutherford carried out the attack out of jealousy because Simcox did not reciprocate his feelings.

== Notes ==
A.Some sources claim he was from Baton Rouge, Louisiana.
