= HMS P556 =

Submarine of the Royal Navy

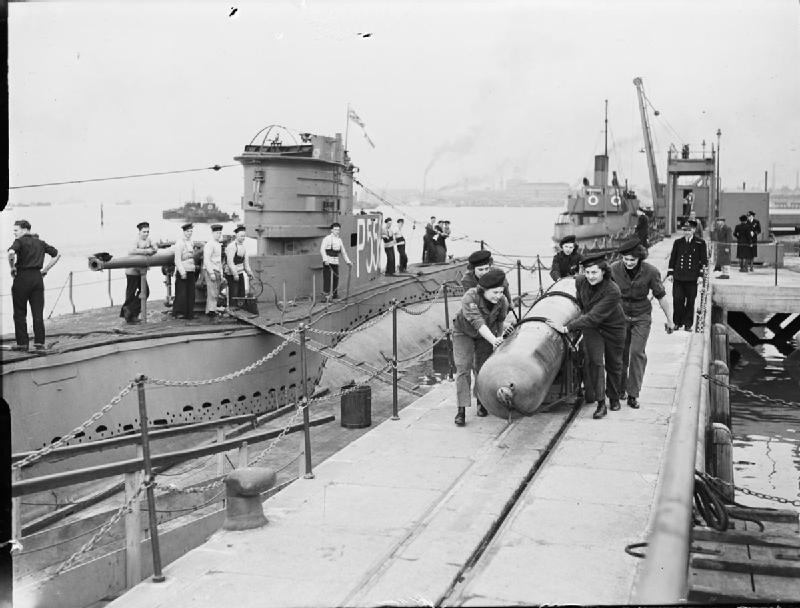
- HMS P556 (left) moored alongside the jetty at HMS Dolphin

History

United Kingdom
- Name: HMS P556
- Builder: Bethlehem Steel
- Laid down: 17 April 1919
- Launched: 9 November 1922
- Acquired: 5 June 1942
- Decommissioned: 24 January 1947
- Fate: Scrapped 1947

General characteristics
- Displacement: 640 long tons (650 t) surfaced; 935 long tons (950 t) submerged
- Length: 202 ft 6 in (61.72 m)
- Beam: 24 ft (7.3 m)
- Draught: 10 ft 6 in (3.20 m)
- Speed: 13.75 kn (15.82 mph; 25.47 km/h) surfaced; 10 kn (12 mph; 19 km/h) submerged
- Complement: 36
- Armament: 6 × 21 inch (533 mm) forward torpedo tubes, 12 torpedoes; 1 × 3 in (76 mm) gun; 1 × .303-calibre machine gun

HMS P556 (pennant number P556), was a S1-class submarine of the British Royal Navy. She was formerly known as USS S-29.

USS S-29 was transferred to the Royal Navy at New London on 5 June 1942. She arrived at Gibraltar, via Bermuda, in August 1942 to refit, nominally as part of the 8th Flotilla. She moved to Plymouth in February 1943, for an anti-submarine training role. In November 1943, she moved to Portsmouth for service in the same role. Due to the number of mechanical failures she suffered the submarine acquired the nickname "Reluctant Dragon".

HMS P556 was damaged by a battery explosion on 27 January 1944, and was decommissioned into the reserve in April. She was returned to the United States Navy on 26 January 1945.

She was sold for scrap to Pounds, Portsmouth on 24 January 1947. There she became one of Pounds' submarine 'fleet' and was not broken up until 1988. The sail was kept and is now outside Fort Southwick.
