= East House mass shooting =

1960 mass shooting in Sheffield, England

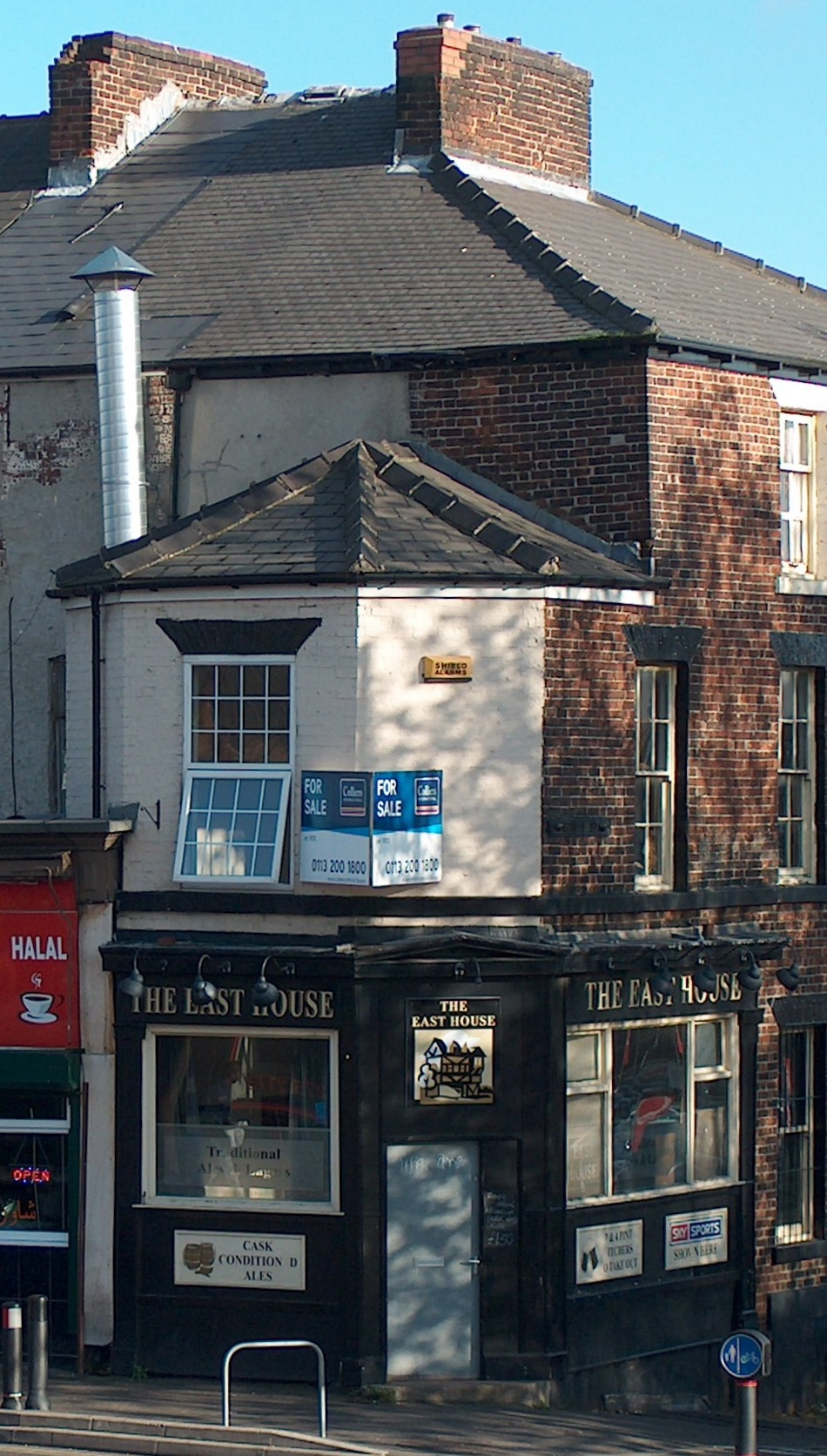
- The pub in 2010
- Location: 53.3906°N 1.4588°W; East House, Sheffield, England
- Date: 1 January 1960; 66 years ago 10:45 p.m. (GMT)
- Attack type: Mass shooting
- Weapon: Smith & Wesson revolver
- Deaths: 3
- Injuries: 2
- Perpetrator: Mohamed Ismail
- Motive: Desire to be executed by British authorities

On New Year's Day 1960, three men were shot and killed and two wounded in a mass shooting at the East House public house in Sheffield, England. The killer was Mohamed Ismail, a Somali from the colony of British Somaliland. Ismail had earlier expressed a desire to end his life but thought that suicide was not an option due to his religious beliefs. He committed the shooting in the hope that he would be arrested and sentenced to death by a British court.

Ismail barricaded himself into the pub's toilet and was arrested there by two unarmed police constables, Gilbert Robertson and Denis Hastings. After being remanded in custody, he was determined to be insane and detained at Broadmoor Hospital for 22 months. Ismail was deported to Somalia after his release, and there he went on to shoot a judge before being killed following another mass shooting in which he killed several people. Robertson and Hastings received no formal recognition in their lifetimes for tackling the gun-wielding killer armed only with their truncheons, but in 2023, their families received bravery awards on their behalf from the South Yorkshire Police Federation.

== Shooting ==
Unemployed Somali labourer Mohamed Ismail had expressed to a group of women his desire to end his life but that he could not commit suicide due to his religious beliefs. He decided to carry out a shooting spree in the hope that he would be sentenced to death by a British court and hanged.

At 10:45 p.m. on New Year's Day 1960, Ismail entered the East House pub on Spital Hill, Burngreave, Sheffield. Owing to the holiday, the pub had been granted an extended licence to remain open past 10.30 p.m., and many revellers were in the smoking room singing Christmas carols around a piano. Ismail refused to join in the singing and then pulled out a revolver. Many of those present thought Ismail was playing a joke and raised their hands in mock surrender before he opened fire. Michael MacFarlane was shot in the torso, his brother Donald in the head, Thomas Owen in the eye, George Fred Morris in the back of the head, and Kenneth Ellis in the wrist (the bullet passing straight through his arm to lodge in the wall). Michael MacFarlane died at the scene, and Morris and Owen died after arriving at Sheffield Royal Infirmary.

After the shooting, Ismail entered the pub's gentlemen's toilet in the yard and barricaded the door. Within minutes of the shooting, Sheffield City Police constables Gilbert Robertson and Denis Hastings arrived on the scene. The officers, armed only with truncheons and handcuffs, had no radio, and their only protection was a woollen tunic. They called for Ismail to come out of the toilets, and when he refused, they kicked the door in. They overwhelmed Ismail and took the revolver, which had a single round remaining, from his hand.

== Aftermath ==
Ismail appeared at Sheffield Magistrates' Court to face three charges of murder and was remanded into custody. Whilst on remand, a prison medic reported that Ismail claimed to hear voices speaking to him through electricity cables and would smash light bulbs in an attempt to prevent this. He was determined to be insane and was held at Broadmoor Hospital for 22 months. Upon release, Ismail was deported to Somalia. There, he was sentenced to prison after shooting at a judge in his court. After his release in the late 1960s, he "ran amok" and shot and killed several people in a village before dying in a shootout.

Donald MacFarlane suffered a brain injury that left him in hospital for three years and caused permanent paralysis. The two constables received no formal recognition for their bravery, and both died before their families received bravery awards from the South Yorkshire Police Federation in 2023. The killings remain one of the most deadly crimes in Sheffield's modern history. The East House had ceased to be a pub by 2017.

== See also ==
- List of mass shootings in the United Kingdom
