= Plymouth shooting =

2021 mass shooting in Plymouth, England

- Location: 50°23′27″N 4°10′15″W; Keyham, Plymouth, Devon, England
- Date: 12 August 2021 c. 18:08–18:23 (BST)
- Attack type: Mass murder, spree shooting, murder–suicide, mass shooting, matricide, child murder
- Weapon: Weatherby pump-action shotgun
- Deaths: 6 (including the perpetrator)
- Injuries: 2
- Victim: Residents of Keyham
- Perpetrator: Jake Davison

On 12 August 2021, a mass shooting occurred in Keyham, Plymouth, England. The gunman, 22-year-old Jake Davison, shot and killed five people, including his mother. Davison also injured two others before fatally shooting himself. The inquest jury returned a verdict of unlawful killing of all of the victims.

The Home Office announced that it would issue updated guidelines for firearms licence applications.

== Background ==
In the United Kingdom, either a firearms certificate (FAC) or a shotgun certificate (SGC) is a legal requirement to own most classes of permitted firearms. In Great Britain (Note: Within the United Kingdom, regulations for shotgun and firearms ownership in Great Britain (England, Scotland, and Wales) differ from those in Northern Ireland.) certificates are granted by the local policing authority. For Firearms Certificates, the applicant must demonstrate a good reason for owning a particular firearm, but not for a Shotgun Certificate covering low capacity (maximum 2+1 cartridges) shotguns. Both require commensurate certified secure storage.

== Shooting ==
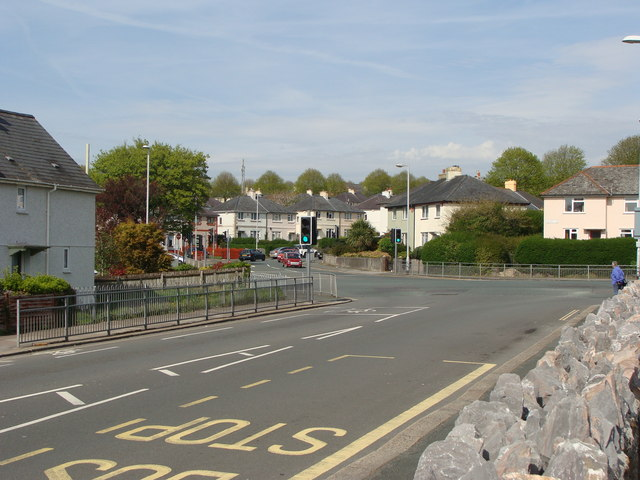
Henderson Place, the street where the shooting ended (pictured in 2010)

On 12 August 2021, Jake Davison had a physical altercation with his mother, Maxine, during which he reportedly grabbed her by the throat and prevented her from leaving a bedroom in their house on Biddick Drive in the Keyham area of Plymouth. At 18:05 BST (UTC+1), Maxine contacted her sister who subsequently dialled 999.

Between 18:05 and 18:08, Davison twice opened fire with a legally-owned pump-action shotgun, killing his mother. He then left the house and fired upon a 3-year-old girl and her 43-year-old father in the street, killing them both. Next, he shot through the front door window of a neighbouring house, injuring a 53-year-old woman and her 33-year-old son, before shooting and killing a 59-year-old man in a nearby park. At 18:11, Devon and Cornwall Police received reports of shots having been fired in multiple locations.

Davison then walked down Royal Navy Avenue, and went to Henderson Place, where, at 18:13, he shot and fatally wounded a 66-year-old woman outside a hairdresser's and remarked to a passing resident that there was "nothing to worry about, mate". He continued down Bedford Street, where he entered a parking garage area and verbally threatened members of the public. He left without firing, backtracking towards Henderson Place.

Shortly before killing himself, Davison was described as "walking like [he] was on patrol, like a soldier with a gun", "shotgun under his chin", and with a "blank expression". At 18:23, as further police arrived, Davison shot himself dead on Henderson Place.

=== Emergency response ===
Devon and Cornwall Police and the South Western Ambulance Service were alerted to the incident at 18:11 and 18:12, respectively. The ambulance service responded with a significant number of resources, including hazardous area response teams, ambulances, specialist paramedics, and air ambulances. Devon and Cornwall Police stated that officers attended the scene within six minutes of the emergency calls and found the bodies of Davison and four of the victims. They described the events as a "serious firearms incident" and established thirteen different crime scenes within the cordoned area.

The 66-year-old female victim was treated at Henderson Place for gunshot wounds but later died in Derriford Hospital. The two survivors received significant but non-life-threatening injuries. At 21:25, the police reported they believed the incident to be contained.

== Perpetrator ==
The gunman was Jake William Davison (21 August 1998 – 12 August 2021), a 22-year-old from Plymouth who worked as an apprentice crane operator at security and defence company Babcock International.

Davison was diagnosed with autism and ADHD as a child and attended Mount Tamar school for special needs children. In Year 9, his review with Careers South West (CSW) – a mental health guidance counselling organisation – stated that "[Davison] loves guns and he wants to join a gun club. Much of the review was taken up talking about how to get involved with guns... we suggested Army Cadets". CSW said Davison's mother had called them in November 2016, saying she was worried about her son as he was isolated and obsessed with weapons. The following month, Davison told CSW that his "real passion" was firearms and he wanted to work in a firearms shop. A CSW employee raised concerns with their manager that a Prevent referral might need to be made; however, this never occurred as there was "no evidence [Davison] was talking to people who could take advantage of him".

He was a regular visitor to Shetland where he spent long periods of time with his mother's relatives, including his two older siblings; it was there that initial concerns were raised about his mental state. In 2016, Davison was reported to the police for allegedly attacking a man and his pregnant girlfriend; Davison was warned by police but not prosecuted. A close source to the family said that Davison had recently deteriorated after suffering from mental health problems for most of his life, and that his mother was "begging for help from the authorities but nobody did a welfare check". During the COVID-19 lockdowns in the eighteen months before the shooting, Davison had accessed a local mental health support charity.

Davison applied for a shotgun certificate in July 2017, in which he declared autism and Asperger syndrome on the form and gave officers permission to contact his GP. He had been licensed to own a firearm since 2018, and police believe he used a legally-held firearm in the shooting. Police had removed his shotgun and licence in December 2020 following an assault allegation described as "a row with two youths", but the weapons were returned in early July 2021, a month before the killings. This was through the force's 'Pathfinder' scheme, a deferred caution and deferred charge scheme designed to deal with offenders outside of the criminal justice process. Following Devon and Cornwall Police's self-referral to the Independent Office for Police Conduct (IOPC), the agency investigated the service's previous dealings with Davison, its decision to grant him a firearms licence and the decision to reinstate the licence, and the decision to return his gun after it was temporarily revoked.

=== Lifestyle and incel-related views ===
Davison uploaded videos to YouTube under the name "Professor Waffle". His videos included references to "inceldom", the black pill worldview and general nihilism. In his last video, Davison described himself as "beaten down and defeated by life" and said: "I wouldn't clarify [sic] myself as an incel but have talked to people similar to me who have had nothing but themselves."

Davison used Reddit to share hostility and resentment towards his mother, who had repeatedly attempted to obtain – and persuade him to receive – treatment for his mental health. On Reddit, he subscribed to incel-related content, and other clips of his videos contained further references to, and used terminology of, that community. In one clip, Davison discussed "missing out on a teenage romance" and referred to "Chads", slang for confident, sexually active men. He said he had considered using drugs to "make up for that missed teenage experience" and that, "I have a feeling like I missed that boat and it's never coming back".

Davison was also active in gun enthusiast subreddits. Reddit suspended his account a day before the shooting for making inappropriate comments to a 16-year-old female American Reddit user. He had initially been friendly with the girl and had discussed having a relationship with her, before the conversation soured and he began to repeatedly ask to have sex with her. According to the report, the girl complained that he had repeatedly asked her to date him, travel to see him, and have sex with him, and had made comments about how sex with someone of her age is acceptable because it was legal in the UK. Various users urged her to report Davison to the police, but she wrote that she did not know what to do and had been advised by her mother not to get involved.

Davison became interested in weightlifting and bodybuilding during the final year of his life; his belongings had 'taken over the house' with him having a bedroom, a computer room and had set up his gym equipment in the lounge. Mr Wood, who was in a relationship with Davison's mother from July 2020 and lived with her in Biddick Drive between August and November 2020, before moving out, said that he had seen Davison using anabolic steroids, which are illegal in the UK when taken without medical advice, and would also "drink 12 energy drinks a day" and would ingest protein supplements as part of his weight-training regime.

Davison's mother had begun to argue with her son over his sexist views and diatribes on women in the months before the shooting. A neighbour said Davison and his mother "used to be close [...] but then his views changed and he went against women and he became a misogynist. They clashed a lot about that." Davison had a physical confrontation with his father shortly before the shooting.

== Aftermath ==
Davison's Facebook and YouTube accounts were terminated in line with the sites' behavioural policies.

In February 2022, Davison's father Mark was interviewed for the BBC. Describing himself as "sorry and ashamed", he said he had raised concerns over his son's possession of a shotgun with the police in 2017.

=== Vigil and condolences ===
An evening vigil was held on 13 August at North Down Crescent Park in Keyham. Flags in the city were flown at half-mast, and Smeaton's Tower was lit up that evening as a mark of respect.

Books of condolence were made available in several locations, along with an online book on the Plymouth City Council's website. Several memorials were placed at areas close to the crime scenes, where flowers and cards were laid, as well as further impromptu vigils being held by residents.

=== Inquest ===
On 19 August 2021, the inquest into the deaths of the five victims and Davison was opened in Plymouth. On 20 February 2023 the jury returned a verdict of unlawful killing of all of the victims. The inquest heard that Firearms Enquiry Officers at Devon and Cornwall Police had received no training for twenty years, tools such as risk matrices were not routinely used and that a "dangerously unsafe culture" had prevailed within the Firearms Licensing Office, which was described as "a dangerous shambles". It also transpired that the detective investigating Davison's assault on two youths had not known what the "FC" marker meant in the Police computer system, which denoted Davison as the holder of a shotgun certificate. Ian Arrow, the senior coroner for Plymouth said that "There was a serious failure by Devon and Cornwall Police's firearms and explosive licensing unit in granting and later failing to revoke the perpetrator's shotgun licence." He also called for reform of the UK's gun laws, saying that shotguns were "no less lethal" than other types of firearm.

=== Police investigation and disciplinary action ===
The chief constable of Devon and Cornwall Police, Shaun Sawyer, said that Davison's motive was unknown, but that police believed the shooting was a "domestic incident [that] spilled into the streets". He stated that police were not considering terrorism as a motive, although commentators have questioned whether Davison's ideologies would constitute terrorism.

The investigation, codenamed Operation Lillypad, was led by Detective Inspector Steve Hambly. (Note: Some sources give the name as Operation Lily Pad) Hambly said that Davison's mother was the only victim known to the attacker. The IOPC investigated why Davison had a shotgun licence despite concerns around his mental health, and the senior coroner asked the office to examine the case of Michael Atherton who in 2012 killed his partner, her sister, her niece and himself, having had a history of domestic abuse and self-harm threats.

On 6 October 2021, the IOPC issued disciplinary notices to two members of Devon and Cornwall Police over their handling of Davison's certificate for his shotgun, which he had claimed to use for clay pigeon shooting.

=== Firearm licensing ===
On 15 August 2021, the British government announced that it would issue guidance to require police to investigate social media posts of firearms licence applicants and current holders. Before the new guidance is published, the Home Office asked all police services in England and Wales immediately "to review their practices and whether any existing licences need to be looked at again".

In June 2023, Debbie Tedds, firearms licensing lead at the National Police Chiefs Council (NPCC), announced that a national training programme for FEOs would be introduced by 2024. Provision of appropriate role training had originally been recommended by the Cullen Inquiry into the 1996 Dunblane massacre, but had not been implemented by police or the Home Office.

== See also ==
- List of mass shootings in the United Kingdom
