= Denmark Place fire =

Fatal fire in London in 1980

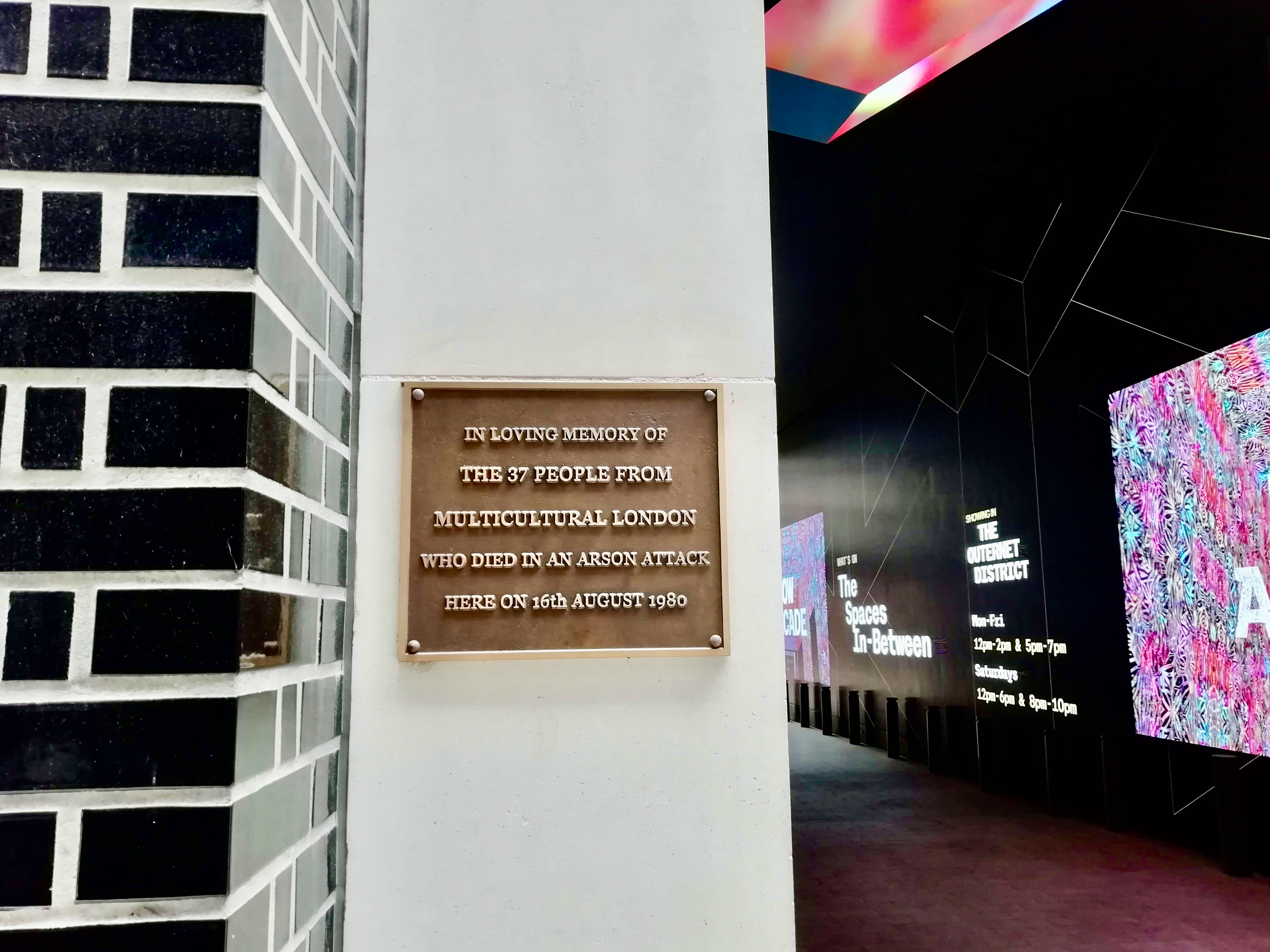
- Memorial to the victims of the fire
- Location: 51°30′54.72″N 0°7′45.84″W; 18 Denmark Place, Central London, UK
- Date: 16 August 1980
- Attack type: Arson, mass murder, massacre
- Deaths: 37
- Injuries: 23
- Perpetrator: John Thompson
- Motive: Argument with bartender

The Denmark Place fire occurred on 16 August 1980 at 18 Denmark Place in central London. The fire, caused by arson, killed 37 people of eight nationalities. Most of the victims were Spanish or Latin American, and were patrons of two unlicensed bars in the building. At the time, The Sunday Times said the fire could be "the worst mass murder in British history". It is the deadliest act of mass murder by a lone perpetrator in Britain’s history.

== Background ==
There were two unlicensed bars on the top two floors of 18 Denmark Place: The Spanish Rooms, a late night bar frequented by locals, including Irish and Jamaican immigrants; and Rodo's, also known as El Dandy, a salsa club popular with South American immigrants. Access to both bars was obtained by shouting up from the street below to obtain a key. The only way into both clubs was through a locked front door and up some stairs leading to a landing.

Access to the club on the lower floor was via this landing and access to the club on the upper floor was via a fire escape enclosed with plywood. Both bars, being unlicensed, were obscured from the outside world by boarded up windows and the door on Denmark Street that led to the fire escape was bolted shut. The Metropolitan Police were aware of the clubs and were planning to shut them both down on Monday 18 August. A farewell party was being thrown over the weekend.

== Fire ==
On the night of 16 August 1980, John Thompson, a Scottish-born petty criminal aged 42, entered The Spanish Rooms and drank there. He believed that the barman overcharged him for the drink and also got in an argument with another customer over a deal that had gone wrong. He was ejected from the building and the door was locked behind him. Thompson found a 2-gallon container outside the club, hailed a taxi, then travelled to a 24-hour petrol station in Camden where he filled the container with petrol. He returned to 18 Denmark Place, poured the petrol through the letterbox of the front door, and put a lit piece of paper through.

Fire quickly took hold in the premises owing to the largely timber construction of the building. Both bars were badly damaged. There were estimated to be 150 people within the building at the time. People could not escape easily due to the boarded up windows, the locked fire escape, and general lack of fire safety precautions owing to the bars' unlicensed status.

The fire burned quickly through the wooden staircase, destroying the main entrance and exit to the bars. Some patrons tried to escape via the back door but found that this was locked. Others smashed windows and jumped out onto the street below. On Denmark Street, there was a music shop that backed onto the clubs and some patrons were found here trapped behind the security shutters. One firefighter managed to rescue six people from this area.

When firefighters were called to the fire at around 03:30, they saw smoke seeping from the shuttered windows. When an attempt was made to force the locked front door open they were showered with sparks and embers and were forced to retreat. Once firefighters could access the front door, it took four minutes to break it down – behind it they found that the staircase was completely on fire.

The speed of the fire was so rapid that many of the bar patrons died where they were sitting or standing. An officer from the London Fire Brigade described the scene:

People seem to have died on the spot without even having time to move an inch. Some were slumped at tables. Seven were at the bar and appear to have fallen as they stood, with drinks still in their hands.

— John Withington, London's Disasters: From Boudicca to the Banking Crisis (2011)

== Aftermath ==
In May 1981, Thompson was convicted on a specimen charge of murdering victim Archibald Campbell, 63, and sentenced to life imprisonment. He died of lung cancer in hospital while in prison custody on 16 August 2008, the 28th anniversary of the fire.

There was comparatively little publicity about the fire, and no formal enquiry into it. The families of some of those who died were not aware of the circumstances. In 2022, after redevelopment of the site, a plaque was placed on a wall in memory.

== See also ==
- Blue Bird Café fire, 1972 fire in Montreal started in retaliation by patrons refused entry who then lit petrol in front of main entrance and only exit; also killed 37.
- Happy Land fire, 1990 fire in New York City at illegally operated nightclub started the same way by aggrieved ejected patron; resulting 87 fatalities is the worst mass murder in city history caused by a single person.
- Clerkenwell cinema fire, 1994 fire in London at an illegally operated adult cinema, intentionally started by an aggrieved patron.
- Ghost Ship warehouse fire, 2016 fire at illegally operated nightclub in California that killed 37.
