= Robert Hicks Murray =

English mass murderer and suspected serial killer

- Born: Possibly Kingston Hill, London, England
- Died: 19 August 1912; Eastbourne, East Sussex, England
- Cause of death: Self-inflicted gunshot wound
- Other names: Robert Charles Mackie; Charles Richard Mackie; Charles Sterling
- Years active: 1912 (confirmed)

Details
- Victims: 4–11+
- Country: England
- States: East Sussex, possibly elsewhere
- Date apprehended: Died before arrest

"Robert Hicks Murray" was the name of an unidentified English bigamist and mass murderer, responsible for the murder-suicide of his children and one of his wives, and the attempted murder of the other. Shortly following his death, Scotland Yard detectives announced that Murray was most likely a serial killer who murdered at least seven other previous wives, prior to the mass murder that became known as The Eastbourne Tragedy.

== Early career ==
Much of Murray's early life, including his place and date of birth, are unknown. He had many fictitious names, posing as an American captain named Charles Stirling, claiming to have served in the Spanish–American War in the Philippines and to have received the Medal of Honor for his part. As Robert Hicks Murray, he told residents of Clapham that he was a captain in the Royal Scots Greys, and in his past, as part of the Seaforth Highlanders, he had served as an enlisted soldier in both India and China. According to a sister of his future wife, Florence Paler, while stationed in India, Murray suffered from a sunstroke, and from then on had bouts of insomnia and depression.

== Meeting the Palers ==
At the beginning of 1908, Murray became acquainted with James Paler, a wealthy railway official living on the Isle of Wight. He was invited to the Paler home, where he met Florence (20) and Edith Paler (17), the unmarried daughters of James. Both sisters became enamored with the young captain, with Murray wooing and secretly marrying Florence in a traditional Scottish ceremony. When she was about to give birth, he sent Florence away to a cottage in Clapham, where the child, christened Stanley, was born.

Six months after Stanley's birth, Robert married the younger sister Edith in a Clapham church, moving in with her on Fawe Park Road in Putney. Each week, Murray spent three days with one and three with the other wife, and on the seventh, pretended to be unmarried. His absences were explained with his service in the army.

In the period between 1910 and 1911, both wives gave birth to a single child: Edith to Winifred, and Florence to Vera.

== The Eastbourne Tragedy ==
At some point, Murray was infatuated with a young girl, the daughter of a wealthy tea merchant. After many tries, and after almost marrying her, Murray decided he must get rid of his families first. In order to do that, he announced to both families that they were going on a vacation in Eastbourne, much to the delight of his wives and little Stanley.

Murray rented a large and beautiful villa on the outskirts of Eastbourne on Enys Road on 17 August 1912, bringing Edith and the 1-year-old Winifred first. Luring them to a room painted entirely in blue, he killed both her and the child, and left the bodies on the floor before locking the door. He then fetched Florence and her two children, bringing them to the villa, but warning them to never enter the "blue room". Two days later, in the early morning, Murray asked the sleepy Florence if she would like a cup of tea. She agreed, but when her husband returned, instead of tea, he was carrying a revolver. Robert shot her in the neck and, suspecting that she was dead, turned the weapon upon the children, killing them both. In the meantime, Florence, who was actually still alive, managed to escape the home and cry out for help. By this time, Murray had unlocked the blue room and carried Edith and Winifred's bodies to Stanley and Vera's, piling them together, soaking them in petrol and setting them alight. He then left £160 and a note in a silver vase outside the house, confessing that he was ruined, wanted to take out everybody dependent on him and asking for forgiveness from God. He then pulled out his revolver and shot himself.

== Aftermath ==
Firemen quickly arrived on the scene, managing to put out the flames before the bodies could be burned. Murray's confession note was located, as well as a badly burned Victoria Cross that was located in the villa. The victims were identified as Edith Mathilda Murray, her child Vera, Florence's children Stanley and Winifred Florence Murray, and their killer - the husband and father, Robert Hicks Murray. It was quickly revealed that Murray had married both sisters, and all of the children were his, keeping this secret from both families.

While investigating Murray's past, detectives from Scotland Yard announced that he had most likely murdered at least seven previous wives, but refused to reveal any further details.

=== Connection to Robert Henry Money ===
On 12 September 1912, Scotland Yard sent a letter to Inspector Miles, informing him that the man was positively identified as Robert Henry Money, whose sister Mary Money was murdered in 1905. When shown a picture of him, Florence, who was residing in Princess Alice Hospital, recognized him as her husband Robert. A resident of Kingston Hill, London, Money had five brothers and four sisters, and once had a business partnership with one of his brothers in Kingston, working as a builder in Hampden, Norbiton and other areas. After selling his business in April 1911, however, he kept little contact with his family, except with one sister, Mrs. Frith, whom he paid frequent visits. Inspector Fox had had conversations with Money, as he had previously been investigated in his sister's death, although he was not considered a good suspect.

The identification was considered a doubtful one, especially by one of Robert's brothers, Alfred. Since it could not be conclusively connected, it is unclear if Murray and Money were the same person.

== See also ==
- List of serial killers by country
- List of serial killers by number of victims
- Murder of Mary Money
