= Clerkenwell cinema fire =

1994 Arson fire in London

- Date: 26 February 1994
- Location: 7 St John Street, Clerkenwell, London, United Kingdom; 51.52011°N 0.10194°W
- Cause: Arson
- Deaths: 11
- Injuries: 13
- Convicted: David Lauwers
- Convictions: Manslaughter (1995)
- Sentence: Life imprisonment, 10 years minimum term

The Clerkenwell cinema fire occurred in the Dream City adult cinema (also known as the 'New City Cinema') at 7 St John Street, Clerkenwell, London, United Kingdom, on 26 February 1994. The fire, caused by arson, killed 11 men. Due to the pornographic nature of the films it screened, and the strict cinema licensing regulations in London at the time, the cinema was operating illegally, and thus was not subject to fire inspections as legal entertainment venues were.

== Fire ==
The fire was caused by arson when a deaf, homeless man called David Lauwers (known to his friends as 'Deaf Dave') lost a fight with a doorman about needing to pay the entry fee again, having earlier left the club. After being ejected from the cinema, Lauwers returned with a can of petrol and set fire to the entrance area. The fire took hold rapidly, trapping most of the staff and patrons within. Eight men died at the scene, seven from smoke inhalation and one from injuries sustained from jumping from a high window in the building, and there were three further fatalities in the following months in hospital, as well as thirteen injuries.

== Aftermath ==
On learning of the gravity of the situation, Lauwers handed himself in to Walthamstow police station. At his trial at the Old Bailey in 1995, he was cleared of three representative charges of murder and was found guilty of manslaughter. Lauwers was sentenced on 27 March 1995 to a life sentence with a minimum term of 10 years.

Lauwers died in prison from a heart attack on 26 February 2001. He was 41.

== Documentary ==
In 2021, the Clerkenwell cinema fire was the subject of episode eight of The Real Manhunter documentary series.

== See also ==
- Denmark Place fire
- Happy Land fire – another venue fire caused by an act of arson by a previously ejected patron.
