= H. G. Pound =

H.G. Pound (officially, Pounds Shipowners and Shipbreakers Limited) is the name of the founder of a British merchant firm in Portsmouth, UK.

== History ==
The firm, founded in 1864, diversified into shipbreaking after World War I and has accumulated over the years vast quantities of military equipment awaiting scrapping. Of particular note is its collection of World War II military equipment, especially tanks and other motor vehicles. In the 1970s and 1980s much of this equipment found its way into the hands of various museums and collectors.
