= Rzeszowski family homicides =

2011 familicide in Saint Helier, Jersey

- Location: St Helier, Jersey
- Date: 14 August 2011
- Attack type: Mass stabbing
- Weapon: Two kitchen knives
- Deaths: 6
- Injuries: 1 (the perpetrator)
- Victims: Marek Garstka; Izabela Rzeszowska; Kinga Rzeszowska; Kacper Rzeszowski; Marta de la Haye; Julia de la Haye
- Perpetrator: Damian Rzeszowski

The Rzeszowski family homicides occurred on 14 August 2011 in Saint Helier, Jersey in the Channel Islands. Damian Rzeszowski stabbed to death six people including four members of his family. He was found guilty of manslaughter with diminished responsibility and sentenced to 30 years in prison for each victim. He hanged himself in HMP Full Sutton on 31 March 2018.

== Background ==
Damian Rzeszowski was born in Nowy Sącz, Poland in 1980. He met Izabela Garstka and in 2004 they moved to Jersey to live with her father, Marek Garstka. They married in 2005 and had two children, Kinga, and Kacper.

In June 2011, Izabela confessed to Damian that she had been having a two-month affair with another man. In turn, Damian had a one-night stand of his own and made Izabela aware of this.

On 19 July 2011, Damian took an overdose of anti-depressant pills and was allowed to go back home after just one night in hospital. According to Damian's family a friend's failed property deal in his home country also contributed to his mental state at the time. He was deceived by a property developer, to whom he already paid 50,000 PLN (around 10,000 GBP). He was supposed to pay it back in instalments of 1,000 PLN a month. Damian's father, who lives in Nowy Sącz, had power of attorney in this matter. The young family spent their final two or three weeks on a reconciliation holiday in Poland. During that time Damian had sex with a prostitute.

Damian Rzeszowski had a history of violence and alcohol abuse and had been involved in several fights since moving to Jersey.

== Killings ==
The Rzeszowski family had returned from Poland on the day of the killings. They invited their neighbour Marta, Izabela's best friend, for a barbeque. She came along with her five-year-old daughter, Julia. Around 3pm, Damian armed himself with two kitchen knives before he started the killings.

His 56-year-old father-in-law Marek Garstka was lying on a couch when he was attacked; Damian, using both knives, stabbed him nine times. Damian then moved to the living room where he stabbed his son Kacper 16 times and both girls 13 times each. Izabela escaped after being attacked in the flat and was pursued down the street in full view of neighbours. She carried a mobile phone with her and tried to contact emergency services, but dialled 997 (emergency number in Poland) instead of 999. She was stabbed to death on the street as neighbours tried to tackle the killer using traffic cones. Marta's body was later found on a neighbour's doorstep where she cried for help before dying.

After killing his wife, Damian returned home while stabbing himself repeatedly in the chest. He fell to the ground with a collapsed lung.

The attack lasted 15 minutes. Police officers arrived around five minutes after the attack.

== Aftermath ==
Rzeszowski was arrested in hospital after doctors carried out life-saving emergency surgery and held at Broadmoor Hospital in Berkshire. Consultant psychiatrist Dale Harrison interviewed Rzeszowski five days after the attacks and heard he could not remember what had happened. After returning from treatment in Broadmoor, he claimed he could hear voices. He denied six murders, however pleaded guilty to manslaughter due to diminished responsibility.

On 29 October 2012, Damian Rzeszowski was sentenced to life in prison, 30 years for each victim to run concurrently.

On 31 March 2018, six years into his sentence, the killer died in a suspected suicide in Full Sutton prison, a high-security jail in Yorkshire. A post-mortem examination determined that his cause of death was hanging. The inquest in April 2023 heard that two weeks prior to his death, medical staff decided to refer him to Broadmoor Hospital. According to Kalina Tyszeca, the British police officer assigned to communicate with Damian Rzeszowski's parents, his father was concerned about Rzeszowski's treatment in prison and told her that "his son should have been in a mental hospital, not a segregation unit, due to his mental health." His family also had attempted to contact the Polish embassy for assistance regarding Rzeszowski. The investigation concluded that there was no reason for Rzeszowski to be in a segregation unit for over 30 days (he was in the unit for 45 days when he died); a mental health care plan was not created for Rzeszowski, contrary to protocol; staff recorded "conflicting information" about his mental state; and the staff had a delay in calling an ambulance. When informing Rzeszowski's family in Poland about his death, prison staff did not use an interpreter, which was considered "inappropriate and insensitive" by the Prisons and Probation Ombudsman's Sue McAllister.

== In popular culture ==
In 2019, two Polish journalists, Ewa Winnicka and Dionisios Sturis wrote a book about the killings, Głosy. Co się zdarzyło na wyspie Jersey. The book was written with co-operation from the Garstka family, neighbours, friends and investigators, and was based partly on court evidence and police documents.
