= Dormers Wells High School =

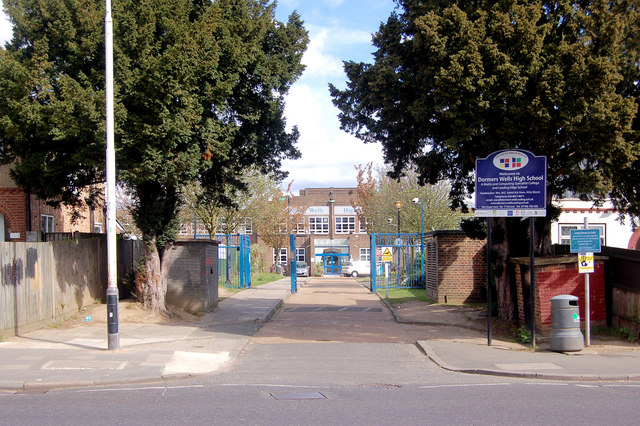

Location
- Dormers Wells Lane; Southall; London, UB1 3HZ; England
- Coordinates: 51.519699°N 0.366504°W

Information
- Type: Academy
- Motto: Opening the door to success
- Local authority: Ealing London Borough Council
- Department for Education URN: 145348 Tables
- Ofsted: Reports
- Head teacher: Ms Walsh
- Gender: Coeducational
- Age: 11 to 19
- Enrolment: 1465
- Houses: Altius; Citius; Fortius; Invictus; Laurus; Magnus
- Colours: Blue and White
- Communities served: Ealing
- Website: http://dwhs.co.uk//

Dormers Wells High School is a coeducational secondary school and sixth form in Dormers Wells, in the Southall area of London, England.

In 2011 the school building and grounds were rebuilt in a £30 million project designed by Nicholas Hare Architects, with Balfour Beatty Construction.

== House System ==
All students and staff at Dormers Wells High School are allocated to one of six Houses.

- Altius ( )
- Citius ( )
- Fortius ( )
- Invictus ( )
- Laurus ( )
- Magnus ( )

== Notable former pupils ==
- Trevor Baylis, inventor of wind-up radio
- Nathan Caton, comedian
