= Keyham, Plymouth =

Suburb of Plymouth, Devon

Coordinates: 50.385833°N 4.176111°W

Keyham
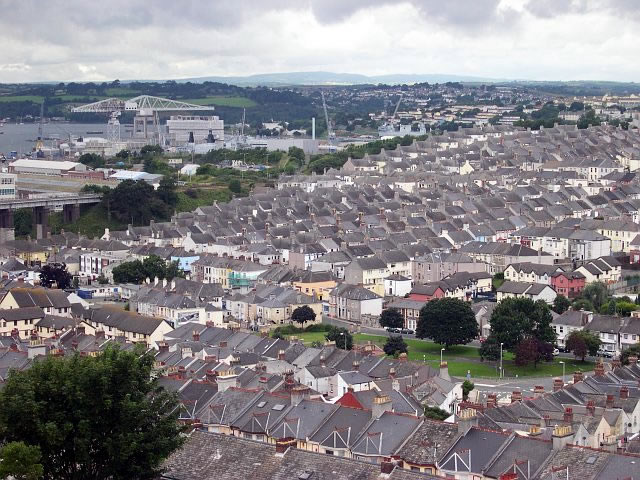
- View of the terraced housing in Keyham

- Location within Devon
- OS grid reference: SX4556
- Unitary authority: Plymouth
- Ceremonial county: Devon
- Region: South West
- Country: England
- Sovereign state: United Kingdom
- Post town: PLYMOUTH
- Postcode district: PL2
- Dialling code: 01752
- Police: Devon and Cornwall
- Fire: Devon and Somerset
- Ambulance: South Western
- UK Parliament: Plymouth Sutton and Devonport

Keyham is a Victorian-built area of Plymouth in the English county of Devon. It was built to provide dense cheap housing just outside the wall of HM Dockyard Devonport for the thousands of civilian workmen.

== History ==
=== 1900s: Early History ===
In the early-19th century, Devonport Dockyard was smaller than now; it was enlarged mid-century by Keyham Steam Yard - Keyham at that period was a suburb of Devonport itself. Keyham Steam Yard was one of the locations for the first trials of the Fairbairn patent crane.

The development of housing was so rapid that HMS Hotspur, later renamed HMS Monmouth, was provided as a chapel ship for Roman Catholic services until the Roman Catholic Church of Our Most Holy Redeemer was built in 1901. That church was destroyed by fire following a bombing raid in 1941 and it was rebuilt in 1954.

=== 2021: Plymouth Shooting ===
On 12 August 2021, a mass shooting occurred in the area, where a gunman, identified as 22-year-old Jake Davison, killed five people and injured two others, before killing himself. His motive remains undetermined, although his online activity made multiple references to the incel subculture. An inquest jury found the 5 people were "unlawfully killed" due to a "catastrophic failure" by Devon and Cornwall Police.

=== 2024: WWII Bomb ===
On Tuesday 20 February 2024, a 500kg bomb was discovered in a back garden in Keyham. An area of 309 metres around the device was evacuated and cordoned off. The Ministry of Defence said that it was "one of the largest peacetime evacuations since the second world war"

An emergency alert was sent to residents in Plymouth around 12pm on Friday 23 February advising more evacuations as the bomb disposal teams prepared to move the device to the Torpoint Ferry slipway to be disposed of at sea. During the incident, thousands of residents that live inside the cordon were evacuated.
