= Hengrove Park =

Park in Bristol, England

- Whitchurch Airport
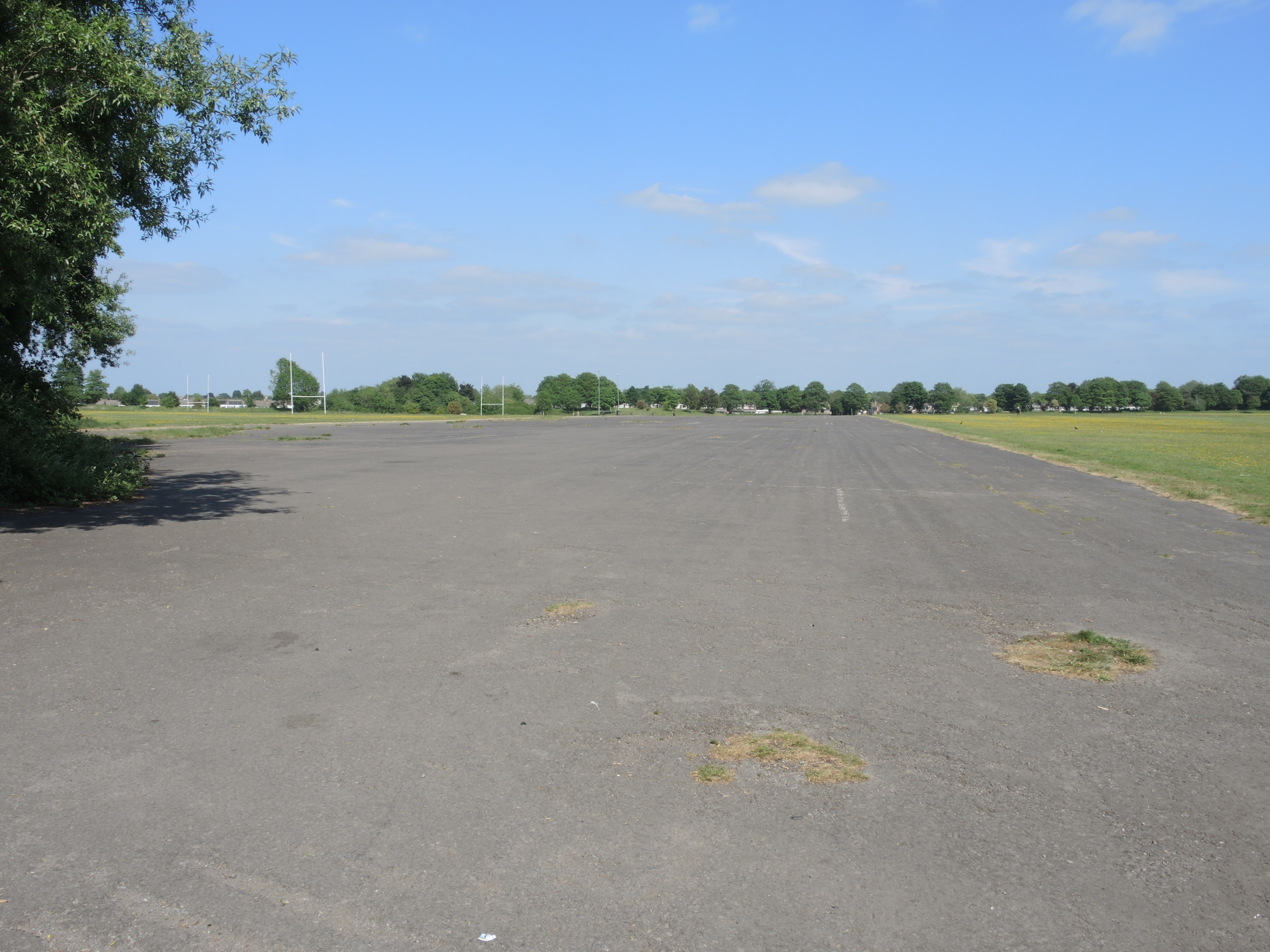
- View across the park from the disused runway
- Interactive map of Hengrove Park
- Type: Urban park
- Location: Hengrove, Bristol, England
- Coordinates: 51.414°N 2.582°W
- Area: 76 hectares (190 acres)
- Established: 1962
- Owner: Bristol City Council
- Operator: Bristol City Council
- Status: Open all year
- Facilities: Playground, skatepark, model aircraft zone
- Website: www.bristol.gov.uk/residents/museums-parks-sports-and-culture/parks-and-open-spaces/parks-and-estates/hengrove-park

Hengrove Park is a large public park in the Hengrove area of Bristol, England. The site occupies the grounds of the former Whitchurch Airport. It encompasses approximately 76 hectares (190 acres) of open space, including a large adventure play park, a skate park, and a Local Nature Reserve known as Hengrove Mounds.

The park has been the subject of significant regeneration efforts, including the development of the South Bristol Community Hospital, Hengrove Park Leisure Centre, and the South Bristol Skills Academy, alongside residential developments. It has been described as the largest regeneration area in Bristol, with its play facilities developed as part of the wider South Bristol regeneration programme.

== History ==
=== Whitchurch Airport ===
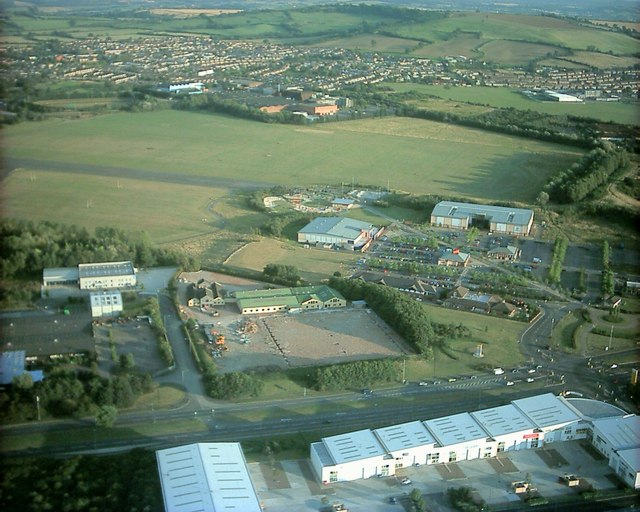
Hengrove Park viewed from the air, where the disused runway is visible

The land now known as Hengrove Park was originally farmland 3 miles (4.8 km) south of Bristol's city centre. In 1929, the Bristol Corporation acquired 298 acres (121 ha) of this land to establish a municipal airport, intended to replace the facilities at Filton Airfield. On 31 May 1930, the site was officially opened as Bristol (Whitchurch) Airport by Prince George, Duke of Kent. It was managed by the corporation in partnership with the Bristol and Wessex Aeroplane Club.

Following the outbreak of World War II in 1939, the Air Ministry requisitioned the airport. It became the wartime base for the newly formed British Overseas Airways Corporation (BOAC), created from the merger of Imperial Airways and British Airways Ltd, which transferred their fleets from Croydon and Heston to the relative safety of the West Country. During the conflict, Whitchurch operated as the UK's primary civil airport, maintaining vital air links to neutral nations such as Portugal and Ireland. Notable figures, including Eleanor Roosevelt and Bob Hope, passed through the airport during this period. The Air Transport Auxiliary also established a base at the site for ferrying military aircraft. To support these operations, tarmac runways and taxiways were constructed to replace the original grass surface.

After the war, the airport came under the control of the Ministry of Civil Aviation. However, the expansion of surrounding housing estates prevented the necessary extension of runways to accommodate larger modern airliners. Consequently, operations were transferred to a new site at Lulsgate Bottom, and Whitchurch Airport closed in 1957.

Archaeological evaluations conducted in 2005 prior to redevelopment found no significant archaeological features or finds in the park. The absence of historical remains led to the conclusion that the construction of Whitchurch Airport likely removed any antecedent archaeological evidence.

=== Post-war transition (1950s–1960s) ===
The transformation of the site from an airfield began on 13 April 1957, when Whitchurch Airport closed after 21 years of operation. The final departure was a Cambrian Airways flight to the Channel Islands at 6:10 pm, after which equipment was moved to the new Lulsgate Airport. Following the closure, the terminal was demolished, although remnants of the hard runways remained visible within the parkland.

Debates ensued regarding the disposal of the land. In 1958, planning proposals for the Hengrove neighbourhood allocated 73 acres (30 ha) to allotments and smallholdings, designed to serve a local population of approximately 9,250 people. In 1960, there were briefly proposals to utilise the site for a helipad as part of a potential municipal helicopter network. In the interim between the airport's closure and the site's redevelopment, the airfield briefly operated as a motorsport venue known as the Whitchurch Circuit. On 1 August 1959, the Bristol Motorcycle and Light Car Club, in conjunction with the corporation, used the former runways to create a 1.06-mile-long (1.71 km) rectangular course with corners named Dundry, Hangar, Knowle, and Goram.

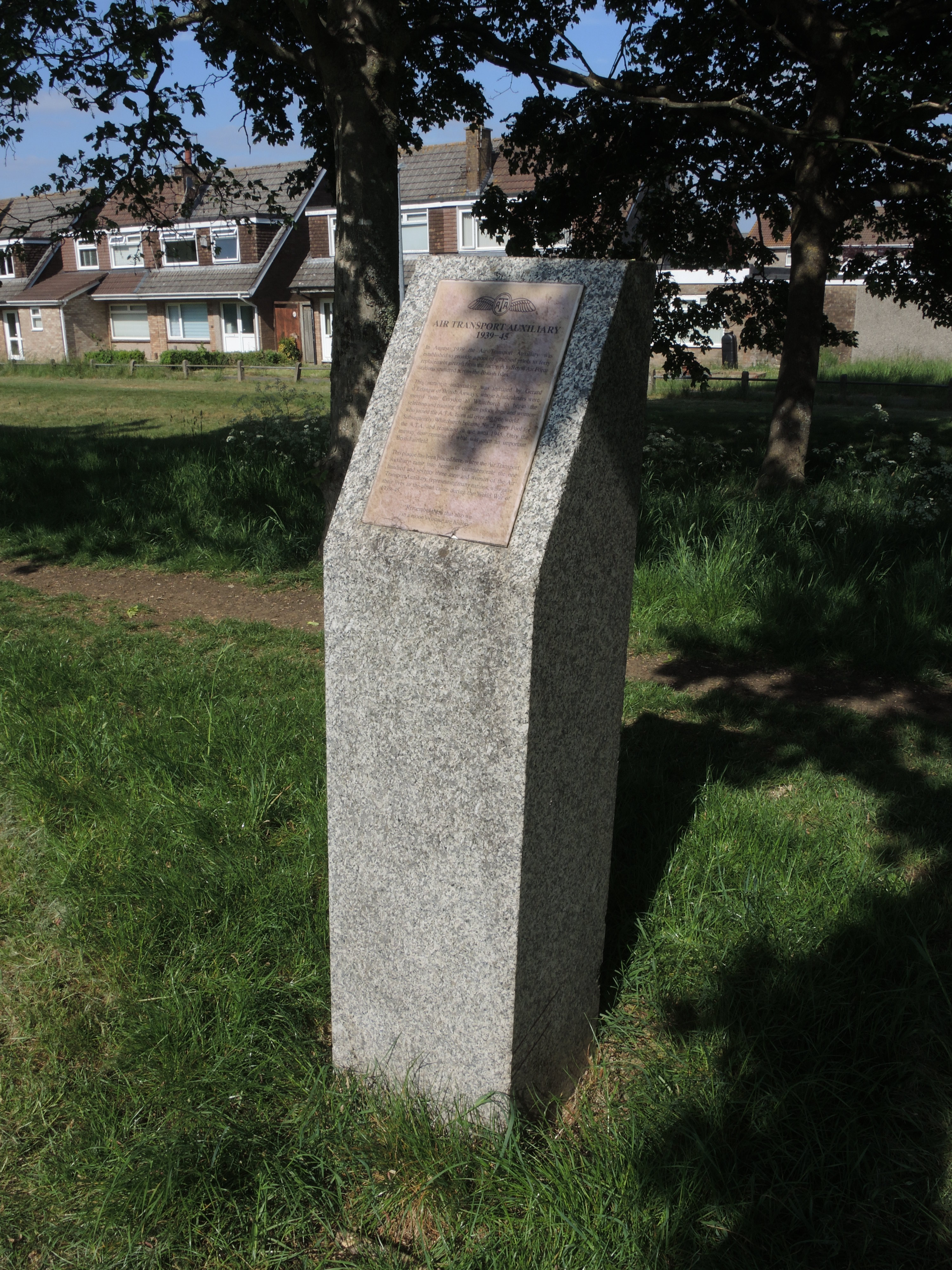
Monument to the Air Transport Auxiliary, 1939–45

The site was officially renamed from Whitchurch Airport to Hengrove Park in November 1962 to reduce confusion for visitors expecting an operational airfield. In 1963, Bristol City Council voted 56 to 48 to sell 102 acres of the former airport land, despite protests from Labour councillors who argued the sale price would not cover the estimated £180,000 required for necessary drainage works. The council earmarked approximately 200 acres for park and open space purposes. In April 1963, the disposal of part of the former airport site became the subject of parliamentary correspondence after claims that the proposed sale of 102 acres would reduce the remaining land available for Bristol's council house building programme, amid reported internal opposition within the city council to completion of the sale. During the contentious debates regarding this sale, Councillor Gervas Walker warned the City Council that the former airport site represented Bristol's "last chance to design a really comprehensive large, modern housing estate", arguing that significant planning had already gone into the proposed scheme. The proposed housing layout for the area survives in the Bristol Archives catalogue, where the "Whitchurch Airport Development" appears.

The St Giles Estate, on the eastern edge of the park and on former airport land, was developed by Bristol Corporation Housing Committee in 1966–67. It was constructed by George Wimpey to a design comprising a modified Radburn layout, and was officially opened on 20 July 1967.

In 1967, during further debates regarding a proposed development of a road safety instruction centre on the site, Labour Alderman Wally Jenkins argued strongly against "chopping a bit out" of the park. He described Hengrove Park as "the Downs of Bristol South", referencing Clifton Down and Durdham Down in the north of the city, and asserted that proposals to take even one acre for other purposes should be resisted.

Throughout the 1970s and 1980s, the park became a venue for local sports and large-scale events. In 1972, the Bristol Sports Association proposed extensive facilities, including an artificial ski slope, an equestrian arena, and a banked cycling track. The park's open nature led to conflicts regarding land use. In the late 1970s, local teenagers used the area for informal motorcycle scrambling, with reports of up to 100 motorcyclists and spectators using the mud slopes on Sundays. This led to tensions when the council began landscaping work to grass over the tracks in 1978, though police later backed calls for a designated off-road motorcycle park by 1992 to reduce nuisance riding that had become commonplace in residential areas.

By 1980, the park was heavily utilised for amateur football, with approximately 250 players taking part every Sunday. To accommodate this demand, a £70,000 dressing room complex was approved in December 1980, designed to serve 120 players, with open-plan changing areas. Further investments included a £4,000 Sports Council grant in 1982 for St Bernadette's Old Boys Rugby Club to construct changing rooms, and a £40,000 drainage and pitch improvement scheme in 1983.

The site also hosted major public gatherings. In August 1984, it was the venue for the 10th Bristol Festival of Transport, which attracted over 60,000 visitors and featured a cavalcade of 400 veteran vehicles. Due to its capacity, the park was considered in 1988 as a potential concert venue for up to 80,000 spectators.

=== Regeneration and stadium proposals (1990s–2000s) ===
In the 1990s, the site was the subject of competing high-value regeneration bids. In 1992, the site featured a 1-kilometre cycling circuit, described as the only closed circuit of its kind between London and Land's End.

In 1993, the council considered a £35 million proposal from South Bristol Ltd for a complex featuring superstores and a 100-bed hotel, but ultimately favoured a proposal by Trust Heritage Inns (THI). Another bid in 1994 by South Bristol Centre proposed a £50 million development across 160 acres (65 ha) that included a campus for South Bristol College for 13,500 students, alongside 1,500 new jobs. The council proceeded with THI's leisure-focused scheme, financed by Sun Life Assurance Society. The project was scaled down in 1994 due to competition from a new 14-screen cinema at Avon Meads in St Philips, leading to the removal of a planned hotel and indoor tennis centre. Phase one of the leisure park was completed by 1996, and the facility opened in 1998, featuring a multiplex cinema, bingo hall, and restaurant.

Several times during this period, the park was proposed as a site for a major football stadium. In 1994, the council rejected a bid by Bristol Rovers F.C. to build a stadium on the site due to the existing agreement with leisure developers. In 1998, Bristol City F.C. published plans for a 40,000-seat stadium at Hengrove Park costing an estimated £25 million. This proposal was linked to England's bid to host the 2006 FIFA World Cup, with the stadium earmarked as a potential venue for group stage matches. The plan faced opposition from the local Labour Party branch due to a lack of consultation. In 2002, updated plans for a 36,000-seat stadium were proposed, but the council withdrew from the scheme in November 2002.

In 1999, the council approved a £3 million project to construct a gymnastics centre of excellence at the park, financed in part by lottery funding and designed to support elite young gymnasts. The site has subsequently undergone further regeneration, with the northern and eastern sections developed for housing, a leisure centre, and educational facilities.

=== 21st-century development ===
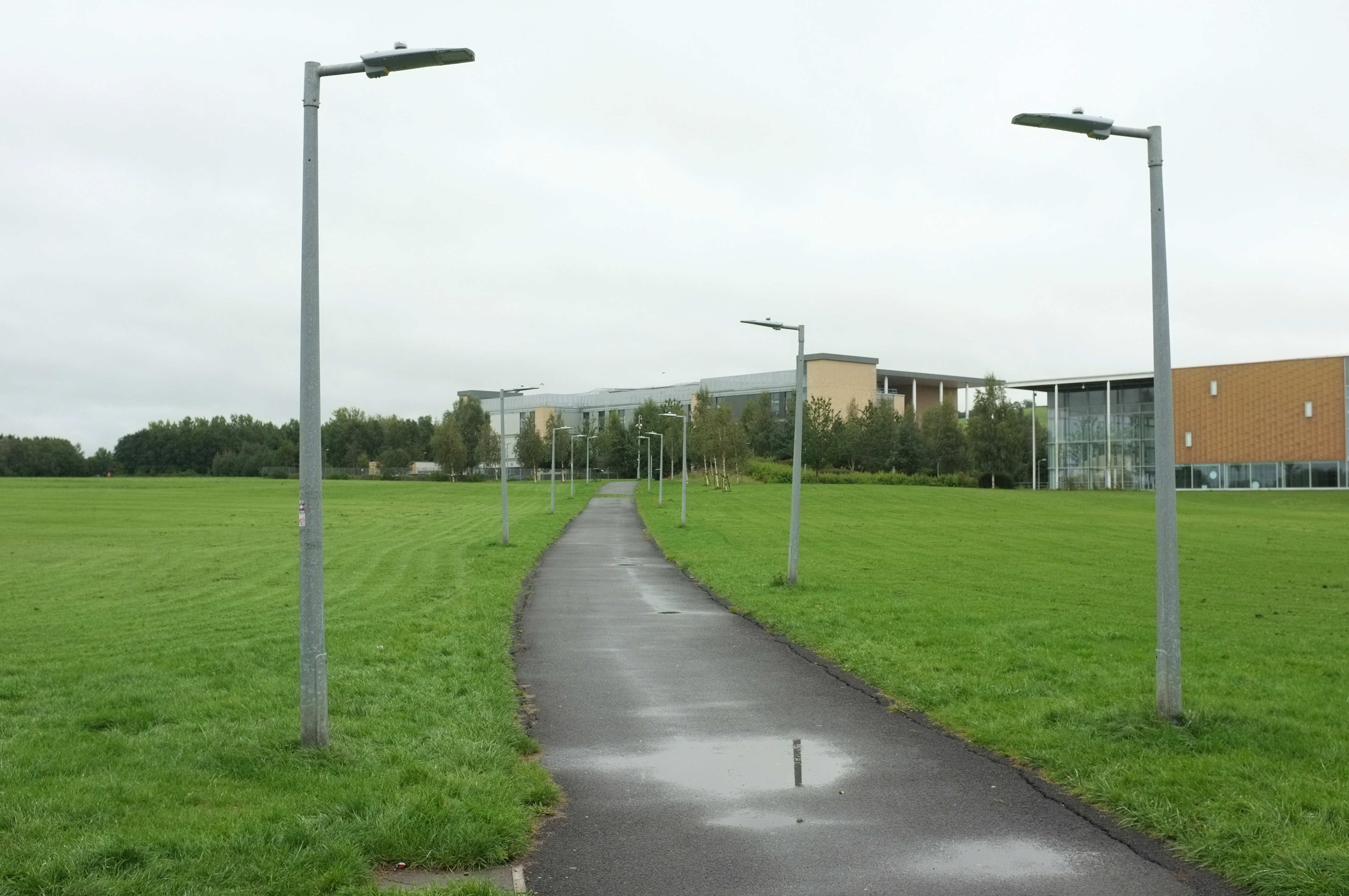
A path on the south side of the park connecting to the modern developments, including a new hospital and college

Extensive public consultation regarding the park's masterplan took place between 2003 and 2005. Feedback from the community led to significant changes in the final plan, including the preservation of the Hengrove Mounds as an ecological reserve and a 50% reduction in the size of a proposed central water feature. The governance and regeneration of Hengrove Park has been compared to similar projects internationally, such as the Bagnoli steelworks redevelopment in Naples. Research highlighted how Bristol's approach involved extensive collaboration with civil society organisations, though final decision-making was often constrained by central government priorities.

Development proposals faced delays in February 2019 when a plan for 1,500 homes was rejected by the development control committee due to concerns regarding traffic density and a lack of community facilities. However, in February 2020, outline planning permission was granted by the Secretary of State Robert Jenrick for the regeneration of around 49 ha (120 acres) of the park, despite objections from Sport England. The consent allowed for up to 1,435 homes, alongside community, sports and education uses, limited retail and other commercial floorspace. It also included provision for a new park of about 22.2 ha (55 acres) and a further 4.4 ha (11 acres) of open space. In the same year, proposals were advanced to redevelop the adjacent Hengrove Leisure Park, with the potential replacement of the cinema, bingo hall and central restaurant units by a residential-led scheme of around 300–350 homes with additional commercial floorspace.

In 2021, the council ended a procurement process to appoint a long-term development partner for the Hengrove Park scheme and moved towards a revised delivery approach. By May 2023, the council-owned housing company, Goram Homes, had established a 50:50 joint venture with Countryside Partnerships to deliver 1,400 properties on the site. The scheme included a target for 50% of the units to be designated as affordable housing, with the development planned to incorporate a new energy centre utilising air-source heat pumps to connect the homes to Bristol's new district heating network.

In October 2024, controversy arose when Bristol City Council announced it would withdraw from the direct purchase of 105 homes at Hengrove Park for its own housing stock. The decision, intended to free up borrowing capacity for maintenance of existing council properties, meant the units would instead be delivered by a housing association.

== Hengrove Mounds ==
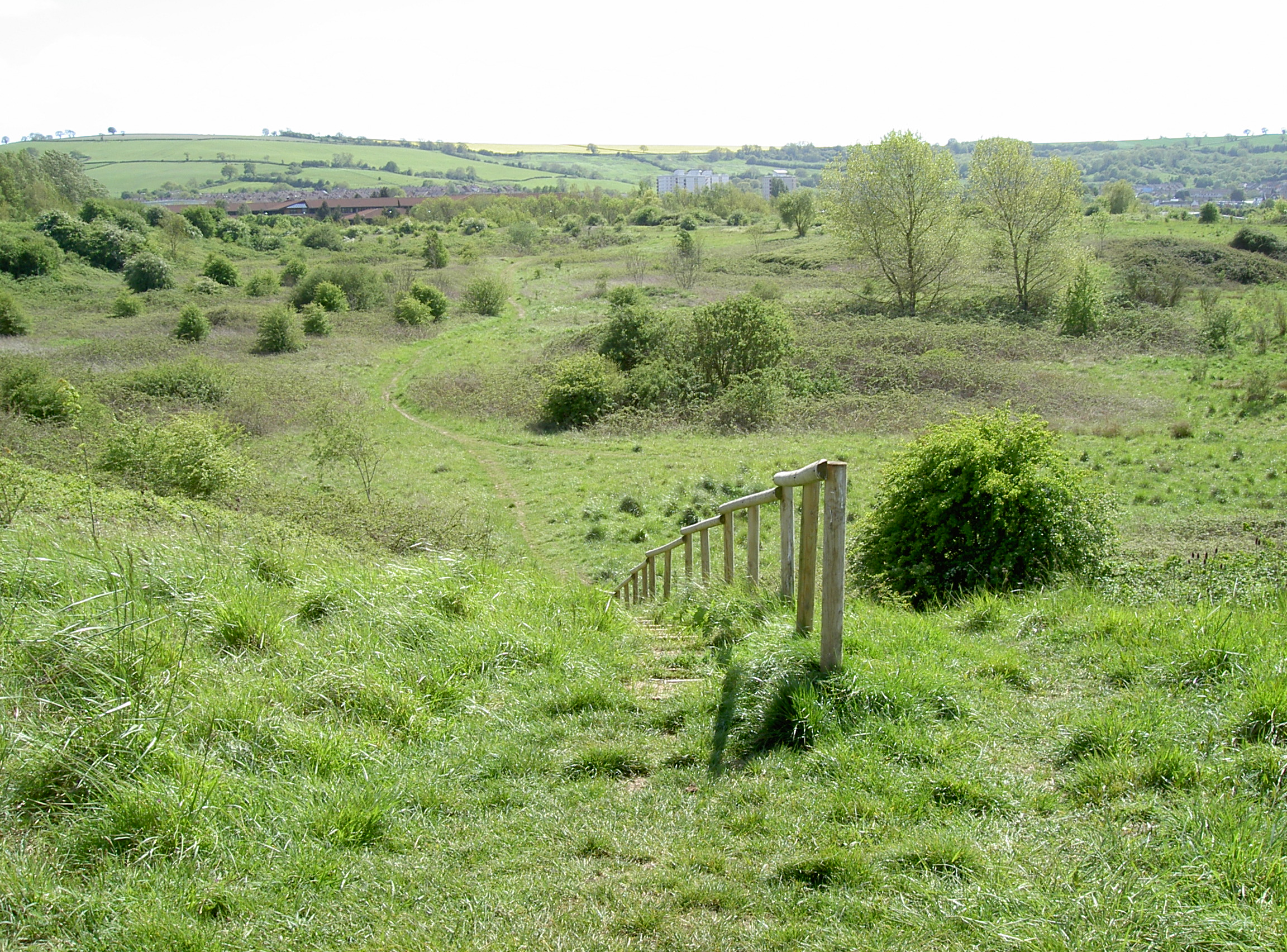
A view of the Hengrove Mounds

Located on the south-western boundary of the park is Hengrove Mounds, a designated Site of Nature Conservation Importance (SNCI) and Local Nature Reserve. From the late 1950s, this specific area was used as a landfill site, colloquially known as "the dumps". The terrain is characterised by a bowl-shaped area with a marshy base, surrounded by species-rich grassland banks. Accessible infrastructure, including tarmac paths and steps, was installed around 2013–14 by The Conservation Volunteers and Bristol City Council. The site supports populations of small blue butterflies, carrot mining bees, and birds such as siskins and whitethroats. In March 2023, a herd of goats was introduced to the Mounds to manage scrub encroachment and promote wildflower growth. The project, organised by Street Goat, makes use of the animals' grazing for clearance of bramble shoots and maintenance of the grassland habitat.

== Ecology ==
Beyond the Mounds, the wider Hengrove Park grounds contain linear tree rows and semi-mature woodlands, including species such as London plane, birch, ash, and wild cherry. The Bristol Tree Forum has raised concerns regarding development proposals for the area, noting that housing plans could result in the loss of significant tree canopy cover. In 2021, they estimated that development plans across Hengrove Park and adjacent sites could result in the removal of over 1,500 mature and semi-mature trees, impacting biodiversity and carbon neutrality goals. The Forum noted that while 1,280 replacement trees were planned for the Hengrove Park development, the loss of existing mature stock would take decades to mitigate.

Historical audits noted that skylarks previously nested at Hengrove Park, though this habitat has been impacted by housing developments. In the early 1930s, the sciarid fly Bradysia austera, a species new to science, was collected at Hengrove Park. The species was later described in 2006 by Frank Menzel and Kai Heller. A 2009 review of Somerset's beetle fauna noted that the Harlequin Ladybird (Harmonia axyridis) and the beetle Mordellistena acuticollis were recorded at Hengrove Park in 2008 and 2003 respectively.

== Facilities ==
The park offers various recreational facilities managed by Bristol City Council. It is also home to the Bristol Family Cycling Centre, which opened in spring 2016 at a former athletics track. The centre provides a traffic-free training environment for cyclists of all abilities and attracted over 18,000 visitors across 2018 and 2019. The park has been noted for its role in Bristol's status as the 2015 European Green Capital, with initiatives promoting sustainable transport and green infrastructure contributing to the city's environmental goals.

=== Playground ===
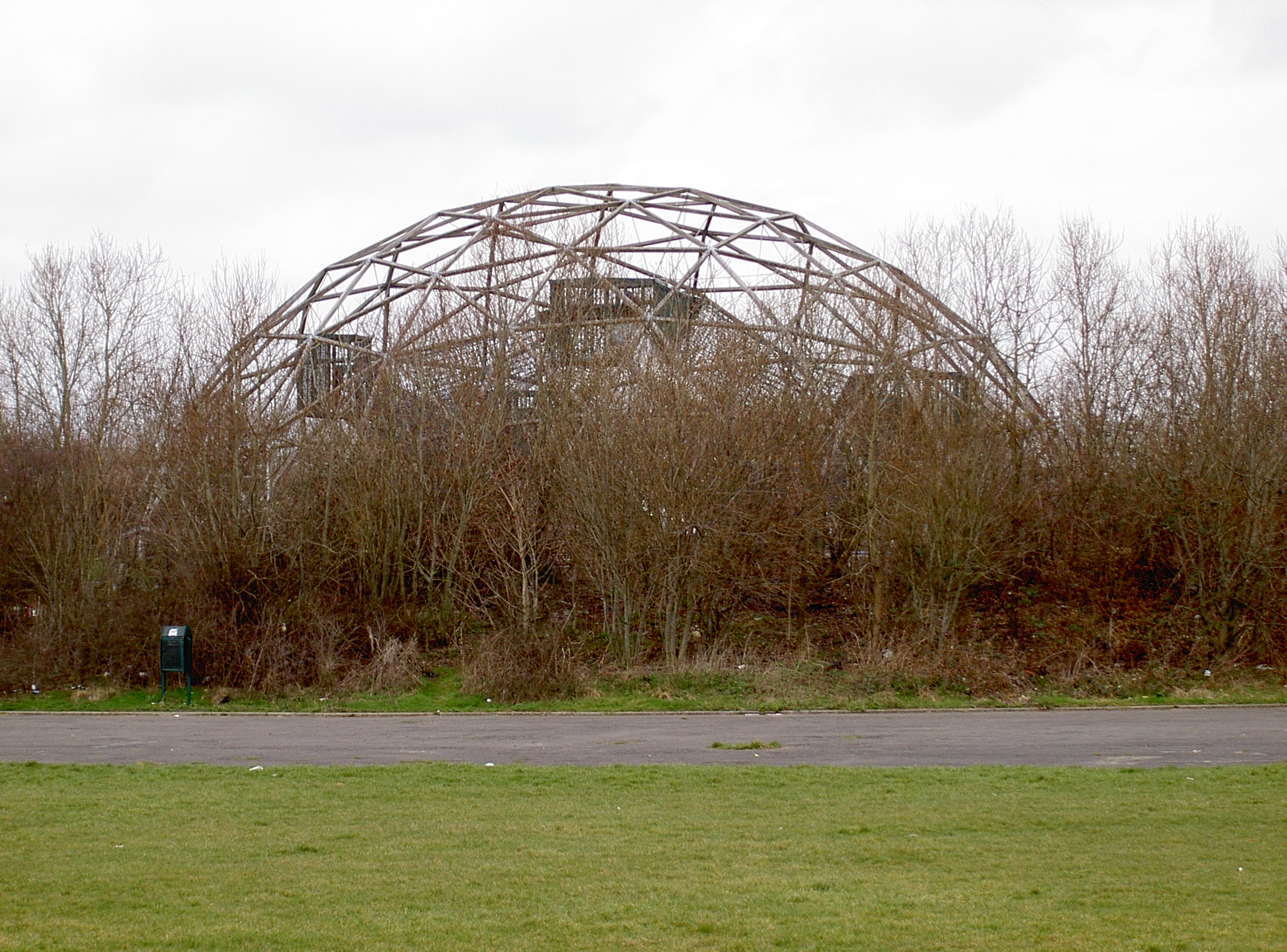
The Jungle Dome in Hengrove Play Park

Opened in 2002, the Hengrove Play Park was developed as part of a regeneration scheme at a cost of £1.4 million. At the time of opening, it was described as the largest free play park in the south of England. The centrepiece of the facility is a 12-metre tall geodesic "Jungle Dome" housing a jungle-themed climbing structure with suspended elements such as hanging bridges. The dome's diameter is about 25 metres and it is built of timber using Azobé hardwood by Dutch firms Arc2 architects and GeoDomeDesign. Additional features include a sand and water play area for younger children and adventure equipment for older age groups. The play park is arranged in distinct activity zones for different age groups, and also includes a separate play garden accessed through the main playground. The play garden contains additional landscaping features such as a small amphitheatre, a tunnel through a mound, and woodland-style climbing and balancing elements. The play park includes the Beach Hut Café and public toilets. The scheme's overall design was conceived by gcp Chartered Architects.

As part of a wider £1.6 million investment in Bristol's green spaces funded by the Community Infrastructure Levy, the Hengrove Play Park received £300,000 in 2023 to upgrade the café and play equipment. In late 2025, the play area underwent a 12-week closure to facilitate the installation of a new water splashpad.

=== Skatepark ===
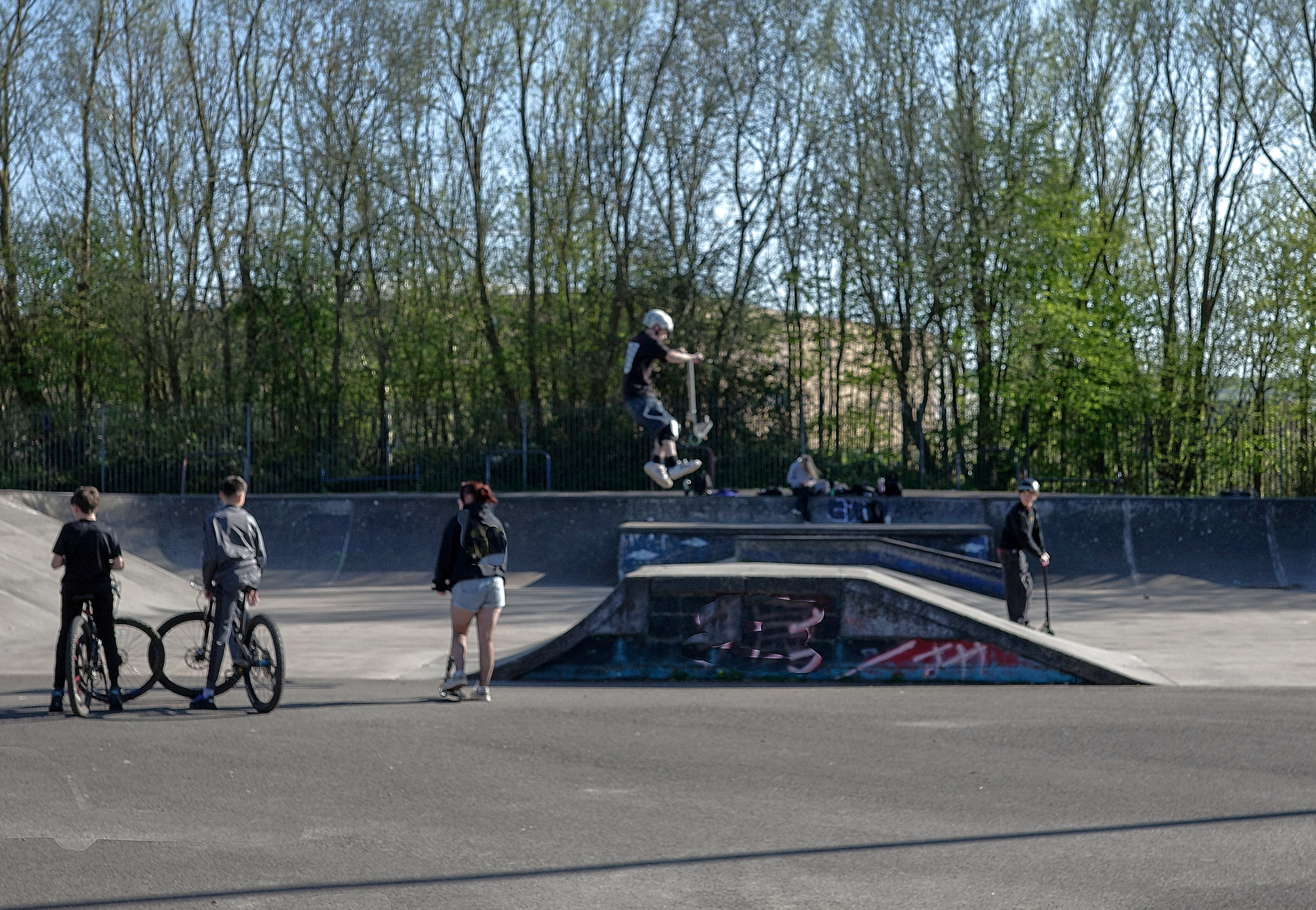
BMX and scooter users in the skatepark

Adjacent to the play area is a multi-discipline skatepark designed for use by skateboarders, BMX riders, and rollerbladers. It is floodlit and open at all times.

=== Future cycling centre ===
The Bristol Family Cycling Centre, located on the former athletics track within the park, was earmarked for demolition to facilitate the new housing development. In 2024, plans were approved to replace the Hengrove facility with a new £15 million regional cycling hub at the Henacre Open Space in Lawrence Weston, approximately 10 miles (16 km) away. The relocation was scheduled for completion between 2026 and 2027.

=== Other features ===
The park includes a dedicated zone where model aircraft and drones weighing 7 kg or less may be flown, provided the operators hold appropriate insurance and registration. The site also hosts weekly car boot sales and occasional events.

== See also ==
- Parks of Bristol
