= Walter Lougher =

English merchant and slave trader

Walter Lougher (died 17 September 1762) was an English merchant and slave trader who became well known throughout the Bristol area. He became a well and respected person among his peers and he participated in many slave voyages around the world.

== Career ==
Walter Lougher was a merchant slave trader from Bristol, and as such was a member of the Society of Merchant Venturers. His vessels went on at least 34 voyages from 1722 to 1765. Slaves were purchased from various locations in Africa, such as the Gold Coast, the Bight of Biafra, and the Gulf of New Guinea Islands. The ships delivered slaves to many places in the New World including Barbados, South Carolina, Virginia, Saint Domingue, St. Kitts, Montserrat, and Nevis. In total, Walter Lougher was responsible for gathering at least 10,253 Africans, and the selling of about 8,227, which meant that between kidnappings and arriving at their destinations, 2,026 of the Africans were lost.

== Vessels ==
Lougher owned or co-owned a number of vessels, which were named America, Cato, Cato Frigate, Indian Prince, Indian Queen, King David, Marlborough, and Peggy. In 1752, the Marlborough was seized by some of the 420 slaves who, after some conflict, escaped to Elmina.

== 1745 Letter to Parliament ==
In 1745, frustrated with Parliament, Lougher and the Merchants committee wrote a letter to parliament to request additional ships and aid on the coast of Africa and petitioned protection of Bristol Shipping against privateers. Lougher and the merchants committee were also frustrated that retailers of wine were not paying their duty on importation so they also asked parliament to make retailers of wine pay their duty on importation. It was ultimately declined by Parliament disappointing Lougher and the Merchants Committee. As he wrote to Edward Southwell that year, "I observe nothing could be done in the wine affair present as the Treasury were determined to admit no variation nor change in their bill…It is nothing new for the Londoners to endeavor as often as they have opportunity to lay what hardships they can upon the traders in the outports, being desirous of having the whole trade of the nation to center with them…" Lougher wrote to Southwell, the MP for Bristol, often. He wrote to complain about shipping and costs, as well as the war with Spain and France.

== Views on War with Spain ==
In Lougher's view the war with France was particularly damaging, causing in the absence of naval protection for Bristol ships on the African coast such a sharp rise in insurance costs.

== Properties ==
Lougher owned many properties through Bristol including St. Augustine Green and was associated with the church in some capacity. St. Augustine's Church is a Victorian Church of England. Lougher was also mentioned several times in the will of Thomas Coster in 1762, along with Jarrit Smith, Edward Richards, William Rous and Thomas Rous. Coster left the men twenty Guineas each, as well as two percent of his estate to be divided among them, and made them responsible for dividing Coster's properties and making sure they go to his daughter.

== Death ==
Walter Lougher died on 17 September 1762 due to natural causes. His will dictated that he leave money for the minister and churchwardens, as well as eight poor widows.
