= Newbury College =

Newbury College may refer to:

- Newbury College (England), a further education college in England
- Newbury College (United States), a career-focused college in Brookline, Massachusetts

== See also ==
- Newberry College, South Carolina
