= Imperial Defence Services =

British defence company

- Company type: Private
- Founded: 1980s
- Fate: Non-operational as of 2012, dissolved March 2023
- Headquarters: Frogs Hall, Bambers Green, Takeley, United Kingdom
- Products: Small arms, Missile

Imperial Defence Services Ltd was a British based, privately owned firearms manufacturer. The website did not quote prices, although it is claimed that it previously stated the company sold grenade-launchers for £450, and a collection of rifles from £195 to a £20,000 General Electric Minigun.

The company website stated:

Apart from countless transactions involving small arms in general, we have completed transactions for Surface to Air Missiles, Anti-tank weapons and a large quantity of Missile Warhead Fuses, Rifle Grenades and Heavy Machine Guns.

— Imperial Defence Services Website

== History ==
Born in 1947, Mick Ranger ran Imperial Defence Services, which was based in the Essex village of Takeley. His firm had operations in Bulgaria, Cyprus, Nigeria, Australia, South Africa and Vietnam.

The firm legally sold rifles to the shooter involved in the Hungerford massacre.

Mick was arrested in July 2012 to three-and-a-half years imprisonment for setting up a deal to sell missiles and handguns to Azerbaijan, a country which has had an arms export ban since 1992. From this point, Imperial Defence Services remained largely inactive, before officially dissolving in March 2023.

== Products ==
The parts were made in Vietnam and assembled in Britain at their factory in Sheffield.

- IDS RANGER-1911A1 - clone of the Colt M1911A1 pistol with an 8-round magazine with a plastic basepad. Comes with: a V-Slot fixed rear sight and fixed front sight, Colt-style rear slide serrations, internal extractor, spurred hammer, standard grip safety, and a curved mainspring housing
- IDS COMPACT-1911A1 - clone of the Colt M1911A1 pistol with a 4.5 inch [114 mm] barrel and an 8-round magazine with a plastic basepad. Comes with: Novak type rear sight and Dovetail front sight, front and rear slide serrations, external extractor, skeletal combat hammer, Beavertail grip safety, extended slide stop, extended thumb safety, and a flat mainspring housing.
- IDS STANDARD-1911A1 - clone of the Colt M1911A1 pistol with an 8-round magazine with a plastic basepad. Comes with a V-slot fixed rear sight and fixed front sight, Colt style rear slide serrations, internal extractor, spurred hammer, Beavertail grip safety and a curved mainspring housing.
- IDS ENHANCED-1911A1 - clone of the Colt M1911A1 pistol with an 8-round magazine with a plastic basepad. Comes with: Novak type rear sight and fixed front sight, Colt-style rear slide serrations, internal / external extractor, Colt Commander type hammer, extended slide stop, extended thumb safety, and a Beavertail grip safety.
- IDS HICAP - copy of the Browning Hi-Power that has a 13-round magazine, blued finish and grip checkering. Comes with: Novak-type rear sight and Dovetail front sight, Front and rear slide serrations, external extractor, skeletal combat hammer, Beavertail grip safety, extended slide stop, extended ambidextrous thumb safety, and flat mainspring housing.
- IDS Ranger 9mm - Has a double-stack 16-round steel magazine, polymer grips, and a black Oxide finish. Comes with a Novak rear sight, Beavertail grip safety, skeletonized Aluminum trigger and combat hammer, and extended slide stop.
- IDS M16A3 - clone of M16A3 rifle.
- IDS MG4A5 - clone of M4 carbine, with a 14.5 inch [368.3 mm] barrel and a 6-position telescoping stock.
- IDS MG4A6 - clone of the CQBR, with a 10.5 inch [266.7 mm] barrel and a 6-position telescoping stock.

== Bibliography ==
- Jones, Richard D.; Ness, Leland S., eds. (2010). Jane's Infantry Weapons 2010-2011. Jane's Publishing. ISBN 978-0710629081.
