= John O'Gaunt School =

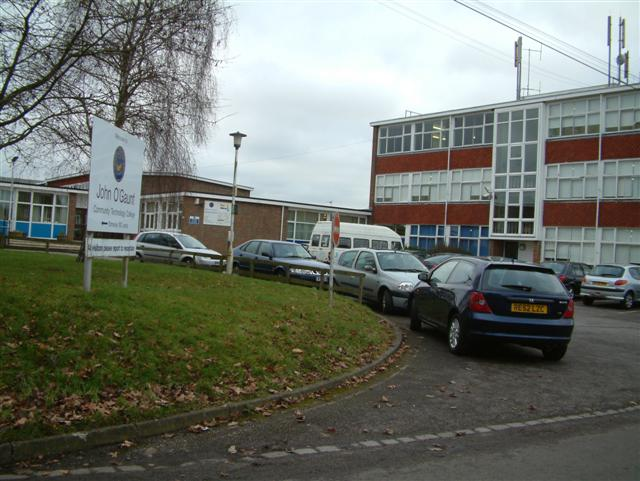
- School entrance and Kennet Block

Location
- Priory Road; Hungerford, Berkshire, RG17 0AN; England; 51°24′17″N 1°30′52″W

Information
- Type: Academy
- Established: January 1963; 63 years ago
- Local authority: West Berkshire
- Trust: Excalibur Academies Trust
- Department for Education URN: 142822 Tables
- Ofsted: Reports
- Chair of Governors: John Adey
- Head: Richard Hawthorne
- Gender: Coeducational
- Age: 11 to 16
- Enrolment: 395
- Houses: Avery Hall, Brunel Hall and Columbus Hall
- Colours: Navy, Yellow and White
- Website: www.johnogauntschool.co.uk

John O'Gaunt School is a coeducational secondary school in Hungerford, Berkshire, England for students aged 11 to 16. It was Berkshire's first community school.

== History ==
Opened in January 1963, the school is a fusion of 1960s decor and 1990s pre-fabricated buildings. The school gained Technology College status in 2003, and was renamed John O'Gaunt Community Technology College before converting to academy status and becoming John O'Gaunt School in 2012. It is run by the Excalibur Academies Trust, a multi-academy trust which includes several local primary schools and St John's Marlborough.

=== Hungerford massacre ===
On 19 August 1987, during the Hungerford massacre, gunman Michael Ryan entered the school during the summer holiday and killed himself in a classroom.

== Sixth Form ==
In the first half of 2014, the school suspended their upcoming sixth form intake for September 2014 due to dwindling student numbers, and intended to suspend the 2015 intake and beyond. For changes to intakes of 3 or more years, West Berkshire Council were required to hold a statutory consultation, which resulted in the Sixth Form being closed from August 2016 onwards. West Berkshire Council have indicated that should demand increase for a sixth form at the school in the future, that consideration would be given to reopening the sixth form.

== Extracurricular activities ==
John O'Gaunt offers mainly sports and arts events. Students who apply for a course at Newbury College are taken by bus.

== Former headteachers ==
- Ian Tucker (2015–2019)
- Sarah Brinkley (2012–2015)
- Neil Spurdell (2009–2012)
- Lin Bartlett (1998–2008)
- Marcia Twelftree (1993–1997)
- Jeff Dawkins (1990–1993)
- Monica Darroch (1990)
- David Lee (1986–1989)
- Keith McClellan (1985–1986)
- David Lee (1975–1985)
- Norman Fox (1975)
- Rex Chesney (1963–1974)

== Notable former pupils ==
- Adam Brown, actor, comedian and pantomime performer
- Charlie Austin, footballer for Queens Park Rangers
- Michael Robert Ryan, perpetrator of the Hungerford massacre, who also killed himself at the same school
