= Bristol (Whitchurch) Airport =

Airport of Bristol, England (1930–1957)

Bristol (Whitchurch) Airport RAF Whitchurch
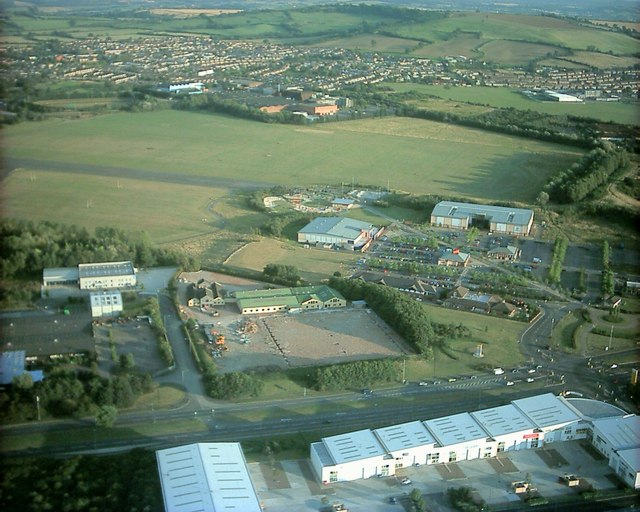
- Part of the former runway can be seen in what is now Hengrove Park
- IATA: none; ICAO: none

Summary
- Airport type: Defunct
- Owner: Bristol Corporation
- Operator: Bristol Airport Committee
- Serves: Bristol; West of England; Gloucestershire; Somerset
- Location: Whitchurch, Bristol
- Opened: 31 May 1930
- Closed: May 1957
- Elevation AMSL: 200 ft (61 m)
- Coordinates: 51°24′46″N 002°35′11″W

Map
- Location in Bristol

Runways
Direction	Length		Surface
Direction	m	ft	Surface
~~10/20~~	929	3,048	Originally grass, asphalt from 1941

Statistics (1936)
- Movements: 4,810
- Passengers: 6,003
- Freight: 2,520 lb

Bristol (Whitchurch) Airport, also known as Whitchurch Airport, was a municipal airport in Bristol, England, three miles (5 km) south of the city centre, from 1930 to 1957. It was the third civil airport established in the UK, and main airport for Bristol and the surrounding area. During World War II, it was one of the few civil airports in Europe that remained operational, enabling air connections to Lisbon and Shannon and onwards to the United States.

The airport closed in 1957, with services transferred to the former RAF Lulsgate Bottom. The former airfield is now occupied by a sports centre, trading estates and retail parks. The South Bristol Community Hospital opened on the site in 2012.

== Early history ==
In 1929, the Corporation of the City of Bristol bought 298 acres (1.21 km^{2}) of farmland to the south of the city, near Whitchurch, for a new municipal airport. On 31 May 1930, the airport was officially opened by Prince George, Duke of Kent. In its first year of operation, the airport handled 915 passengers, and by 1939 it handled 4,000 passengers. The Bristol and Wessex Aeroplane Club relocated from Filton Airfield, and together with Bristol Corporation, managed the facilities. The first buildings were a hangar, a clubhouse for the flying club, and an aircraft showroom.

Early services were an "air ferry" to Cardiff, operated by Norman Edgar & Co, and flights to Torquay and Teignmouth. By 1932, two air taxi firms were based at the airport. By 1934, Bristol Air Taxis was joined by Railway Air Services, a subsidiary of Imperial Airways, offering connections to Plymouth, Birmingham, London, Southampton and Liverpool.

In July 1935, a new terminal building was opened, and regular international services started with flights on the Cardiff-Whitchurch-Le Touquet-Paris Le Bourget route.

In 1936, Norman Edgar moved to the new airport at Weston-super-Mare. The company had been renamed Norman Edgar (Western Airways) Ltd, and in 1938 it was taken over by the Straight Corporation, headed by Whitney Straight who renamed it Western Airways, Ltd.

In 1937, Irish Sea Airways (precursor of Aer Lingus), and Great Western and Southern Airlines commenced operations from Whitchurch.

In July 1938, the Government formed a Civil Air Guard to train pilots for what was widely seen as the forthcoming war. The Bristol and Wessex Aeroplane Club was one of the training organisations enlisted in this effort, and in addition No. 33 Elementary and Reserve Flying Training School was established at Whitchurch to prepare RAFVR pilots. In August 1938, Frank Barnwell, the chief designer of the Bristol Aeroplane Company, died when an ultralight monoplane he had designed and built himself, the Barnwell B.S.W., struck a bump when taking off and stalled, crashing onto a nearby road.

== Second World War ==
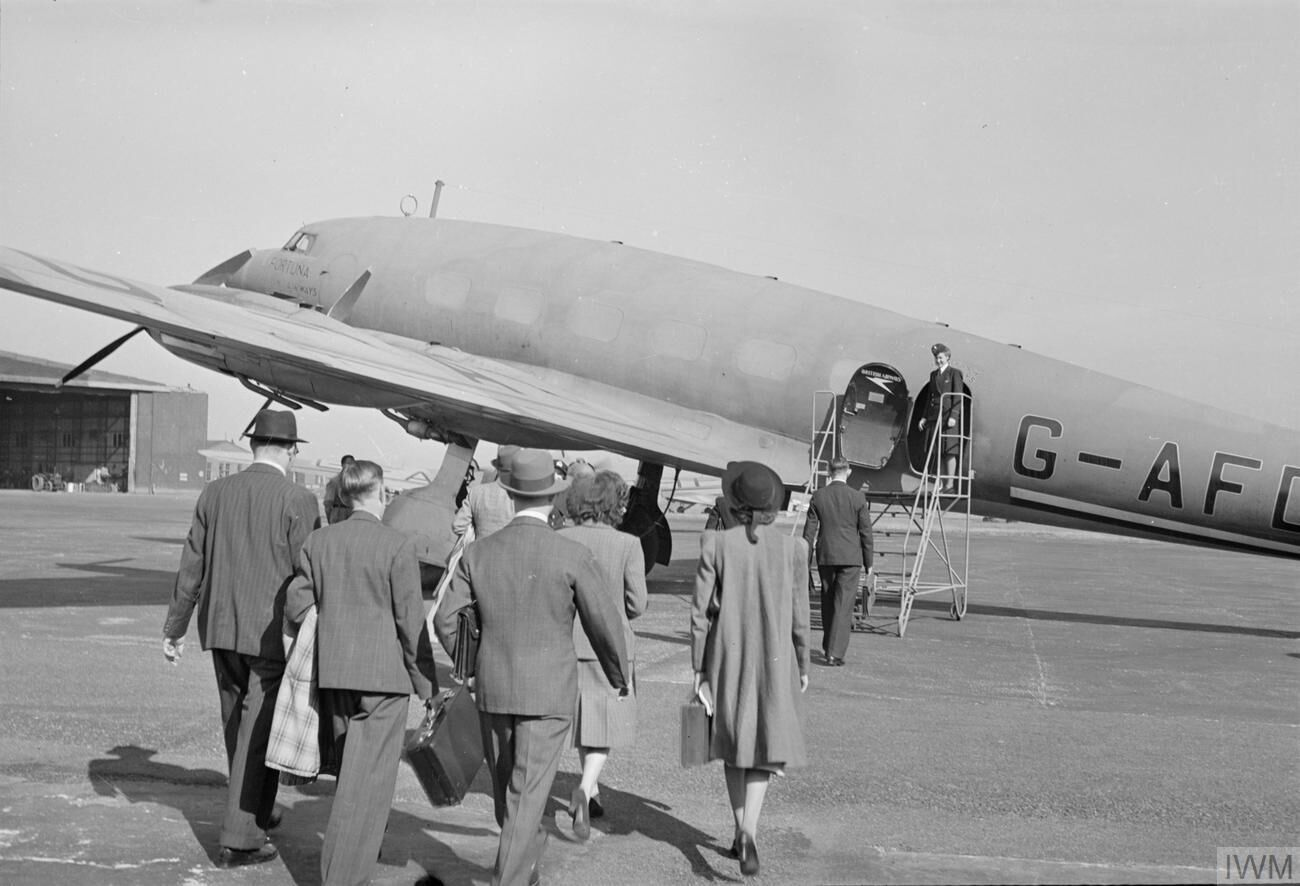
A BOAC de Havilland Albatross at Whitchurch, circa 1941

In late August 1939, the airport was requisitioned by the Air Ministry, and was declared a Restricted Area. Starting on 1 September 1939, 59 aircraft belonging to Imperial Airways and British Airways Ltd were evacuated from Croydon Airport and Heston Aerodrome to Whitchurch. The two airlines, which were in the process of merging to form British Overseas Airways Corporation (BOAC), became the nucleus of National Air Communications (NAC), formed to undertake wartime air transport work. Airport security was increased, with barbed wire fencing and Air Ministry police posts. During the next two years, an east–west tarmac runway and taxiways were constructed. In late 1939, civilian flights resumed. From September 1940, six aircraft of the Dutch airline KLM, which had escaped to Britain after the German invasion of the Netherlands, were also based at Whitchurch. These aircraft with their Dutch crews operated flights to Lisbon in neutral Portugal, under charter to BOAC.

The Air Transport Auxiliary established No. 2 Ferry Pilots Pool ATA (FPP) at Whitchurch during 1940. No. 2 FPP was mainly concerned with ferrying Blenheims, Beaufighters and Beauforts built by the Bristol Aeroplane Company at Filton; Hurricanes built by the Gloster Aircraft Company at Brockworth, Gloucestershire and Whirlwinds and Spitfires produced by Westland Aircraft at Yeovil in Somerset. The unit was disbanded in 1945.

During 1942–1943, civil services were developed to Shannon Airport and an extension of the Lisbon route to Gibraltar, with Lisbon and Shannon providing connections to the United States. Famous passengers who used these services included Bob Hope, Bing Crosby, Queen Wilhelmina of the Netherlands and Eleanor Roosevelt. On 1 June 1943, BOAC Flight 777 was shot down en route to Whitchurch from Lisbon, with the loss of four Dutch crew and 13 passengers, including the actor Leslie Howard.

In November 1944, BOAC moved out to Hurn Airport, Bournemouth, because the runways there were capable of accommodating larger aircraft, and the success of the Invasion of Normandy had lessened the danger from the Luftwaffe.

== Post war ==
After the war, the airport came under the control of the Ministry of Civil Aviation. A number of flying clubs used the airport but it did not attract many scheduled services; from 1953, Morton Air Services operated flights to the Channel Islands, the Isle of Wight and the Isle of Man, whilst Cambrian Airways operated both domestic and international flights to France.

The airport had become too small for airline operations, with surrounding housing estates limiting runway extension, so a new site at the former RAF Lulsgate Bottom was opened in May 1957 as Bristol Airport. In 1957, flying ceased at Whitchurch, and in 1959 the airfield was re-opened as Whitchurch Circuit, a car racing circuit holding Formula Two and Formula Three races. Over the years, the area has been developed as housing and trading estates known as Hengrove Park, although part of the main runway still exists.

In 1993, a Cessna 152 aircraft made an emergency landing there, short of fuel.

In 2009, it was announced that part of the former airfield was to be developed as South Bristol Community Hospital, a Skills Academy and a leisure centre.

== Bibliography ==
- Cluett, Douglas; Bogle, Joanna; Learmonth, Bob. 1984. Croydon Airport and The Battle for Britain. London Borough of Sutton. ISBN 0-907335-11-X.
- Cluett, Douglas; Nash, Joanna; Learmonth, Bob. 1980. Croydon Airport 1928 - 1939, The Great Days. London Borough of Sutton ISBN 0-9503224-8-2
- Doyle, Neville. 2002. The Triple Alliance: The Predecessors of the first British Airways. Air-Britain. ISBN 0-85130-286-6
- Moss, Peter W. 1962. Impressments Log (Vol I-IV). Air-Britain.
- Wakefield, Kenneth (1997). "Somewhere in the west country": the history of Bristol (Whitchurch) Airport, 1930-1957. Wilmslow: Crécy. ISBN 0-947554-65-3.
