= 1987 Redfield and Patchway spree killings =

1987 mass murder in Bristol, England

- 1987 Redfield and Patchway spree killings (Bristol)
- Location: Redfield, Bristol and Patchway, Gloucestershire
- Date: 14 October 1987; 07:00–10:35 BST
- Attack type: Spree killing, familicide, attempted femicide, attempted arson
- Weapons: Hammer, pump-action shotgun, over-and-under shotgun, sawn-off shotgun
- Deaths: 4
- Injuries: 0
- Perpetrator: Kevin Weaver
- Motive: Obsessional revenge following relationship breakdown; Mental illness; Hungerford massacre copycat crime

The 1987 Redfield and Patchway spree killing was a mass murder that occurred in Bristol and Patchway, England, on 14 October 1987. 24-year-old Kevin Weaver killed his mother and sister at their Redfield home, then drove to his former fiancée's workplace in Patchway, where he shot dead two male colleagues and attempted to murder her. Occurring eight weeks after, and inspired by the Hungerford massacre, the attack intensified calls for tighter gun control prior to the passage of the Firearms (Amendment) Act 1988.

== Attacks ==
=== Redfield familicide ===
At about 07:00 BST Weaver fatally bludgeoned his sister, Linda Weaver (27), with a hammer, striking her more than 30 times and snapping the shaft. When their mother, Margaret Weaver (55), returned home at 07:50 he killed her in a similar manner. Weaver placed both bodies in a bathtub of cold water, laundered his clothes, and left gas taps open with a chip pan to create a potential explosion.

=== Patchway shooting ===
Shortly before 09:50 he drove his sister's white Morris Marina to the Alexandra Workwear factory on Britannia Road, Patchway carrying three shotguns and more than 500 cartridges. In the computer room he seized his former fiancée Alison Woodman (21). When she dived beneath a desk he opened fire, killing computer manager David Pursall (29) and accountant John Peterson (48). Weaver told Woodman, "this is your lucky day," and left the building.

=== Arrest ===
At 10:35 two unarmed traffic officers, Mark Nicholson and Peter Pugsley, intercepted Weaver on the A37 (Hursley Hill) in Whitchurch, where he surrendered without resistance. Officers recovered three loaded shotguns, body armour and hundreds of rounds of ammunition from his car.

== Aftermath ==
=== Emergency response ===
Police ventilated the gas-filled Weaver home by shooting out windows. A cordoned area containing 100 houses in Redfield was briefly evacuated.

=== Inquest and trial ===
An inquest opened on 15 October 1987. Weaver was later charged with four murders, but the Crown Court accepted pleas of manslaughter on grounds of diminished responsibility. On 28 March 1988 he was ordered to be detained at Broadmoor Hospital "without limitation of time".

=== Public debate and legislation ===
Avon and Somerset Police Assistant Chief Constable John Harland urged stricter controls on mail-order shotguns and warned that routine re-arming of police might become unavoidable. Bristol's Lord Mayor launched a victims' fund and petitioned the Home Secretary for "immediate reform".

== Perpetrator ==
=== Background ===
Kevin John Weaver (born 1963) grew up in Bristol. After his father's death in 1979 he became reclusive, remaining in the family home with his mother and sister. He worked intermittently as an accounts clerk and joined a clay-pigeon club, legally acquiring four shotguns.

Weaver and Woodman began dating in 1983 and became engaged in 1984. She ended the relationship in August 1985, citing his possessiveness. Thereafter Weaver stalked her and once abducted her at gunpoint, leading to the temporary seizure of his firearms in 1986.

=== Firearms ownership ===
Weaver legally possessed a Russian over-and-under 12-bore, an Italian 12-bore pump-action, a Spanish side-by-side (later shortened), and a .410 shotgun. All but the sawn-off gun were held on an ordinary shotgun certificate. Police had returned two confiscated weapons after a doctor declared him mentally fit in 1986.

=== Health and motive ===
Four psychiatrists diagnosed a psychotic disorder and severe depression. Weaver admitted harbouring a two-year plan to kill Woodman and said he had recorded television coverage of the Hungerford massacre. The court concluded that obsessive revenge, rather than political or ideological grievance, was the primary motive.

== Legacy ==
The killings reinforced momentum for the Firearms (Amendment) Act 1988 and informed later debates that produced the Firearms (Amendment) Act 1997.

A civic appeal aided the families of the dead. Pursall was posthumously awarded the Wally Cohen Shield for bravery, while colleagues Shaun Murphy and Victor Leigh received police commendations for protecting a disabled co-worker.

== See also ==
- Hungerford massacre, which occurred the same year and influenced Weaver's killings
- Murder of Shirley Banks, an Alexandra Workwear employee who was missing at the time
- Gun laws in the United Kingdom
- List of rampage killers in Europe
