= Hungerford massacre =

1987 spree shooting in England

- Michael Ryan in 1986
- Location: 51°24′41″N 1°30′50″W; Savernake Forest, Wiltshire, and Hungerford, Berkshire, England
- Date: 19 August 1987; 39 years ago c. 12:30 – 1:45 (BST)
- Target: Random civilians
- Attack type: Spree shooting, mass shooting, mass murder, murder-suicide, matricide, arson
- Weapons: Norinco Type 56S; Underwood M1 carbine; Beretta pistol
- Deaths: 17 (including the perpetrator)
- Injuries: 15
- Perpetrator: Michael Ryan
- Motive: Unknown

The Hungerford massacre was a spree shooting in Wiltshire and Berkshire, England, which occurred on 19 August 1987 when 27-year-old Michael Ryan shot and killed sixteen people, including his mother and an unarmed police officer, before killing himself. No motive for the killings was established.

A report on the massacre, commissioned by Home Secretary Douglas Hurd, found that understaffing and telecommunication problems may have hampered the police response to the developing incident. The killings were committed using legally owned handguns and semi-automatic rifles, and the report stated that existing firearms legislation should be more stringent. Consequently, the Firearms (Amendment) Act 1988 was passed in the wake of the massacre, banning unlicensed ownership of semi-automatic centre-fire rifles and restricting the use of shotguns with a capacity of more than three cartridges.

Subsequent shootings in Dunblane in 1996 and in Cumbria in 2010 have been compared to the Hungerford massacre, and it remains one of the deadliest firearms incidents in British history.

== Shootings ==
=== Wiltshire ===
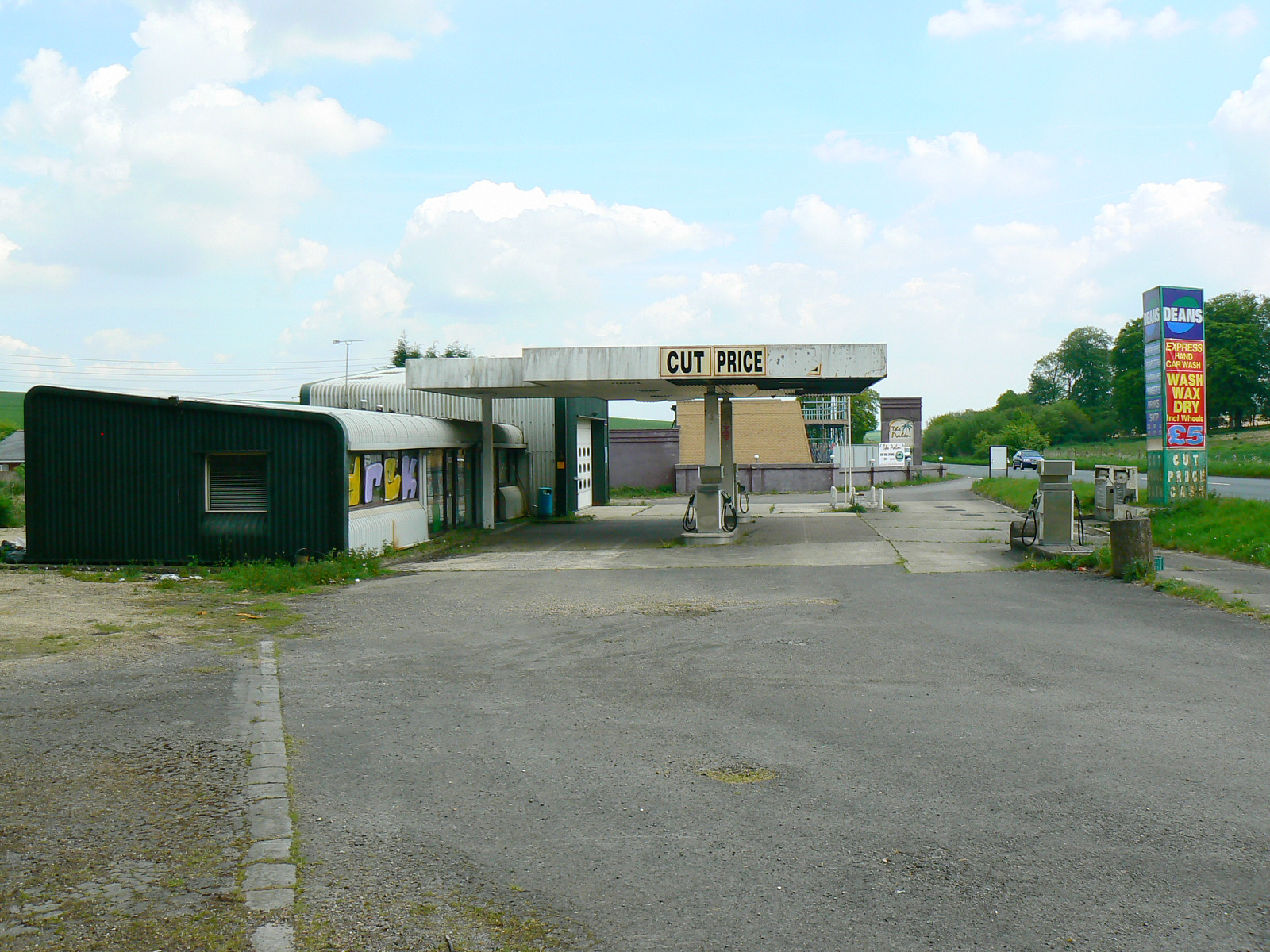
The Golden Arrow petrol station near Froxfield, Wiltshire, where Ryan attempted to shoot the cashier (pictured in 2010)

On the morning of Wednesday 19 August 1987, 27-year-old Michael Ryan drove his silver Vauxhall Astra GTE to Savernake Forest, Wiltshire, seven miles (11 km) to the west of his hometown of Hungerford. In his car were his Beretta pistol, M1 carbine rifle, and the Type 56 assault rifle. That day, 35-year-old Susan Godfrey and her two pre-school children had travelled from Burghfield Common near Reading and were picnicking in the forest. At 12:30 BST, Ryan, openly armed, approached the family. Godfrey placed the children in her car before Ryan walked her at gunpoint 75–100 yards (70–90 m) into the forest and shot her 13 times with the Beretta. A woman walking in the woods found the children, who introduced themselves to the woman and said "[a] man in black killed my mummy".

Ryan left the forest and drove east on the A4, stopping to fill both his car and a petrol can at the Golden Arrow petrol station near Froxfield at approximately 12:35. After another customer at the station left, Ryan shot at the cashier from the forecourt using the M1 carbine. He entered the store and attempted to shoot her at point-blank range; either his gun had jammed or the magazine had inadvertently detached. He left the petrol station, driving east into Berkshire. The cashier telephoned 999; this call had been preceded by another emergency call from the previous customer who believed they had seen an armed robbery. Thames Valley Police (TVP) sent two patrol cars to the A4 to investigate. They were at that point unaware of the murder in Savernake Forest, which had been responded to by officers from Wiltshire Police, and there were initially two manhunts underway.

=== Hungerford ===
Streets and locations where fatal shootings occurred in Hungerford
1 South View
2 Hungerford Common footpath
3 Fairview Road
4 Memorial Gardens
5 Bulpit Lane
6 Priory Avenue
7 Priory Road
8 John O'Gaunt School

==== South View and Fairview Road ====
After leaving Froxfield, Ryan returned to the home he shared with his mother on South View in Hungerford. Arriving there at approximately 12:45, he was seen by neighbours who described him as looking upset. Soon after Ryan entered the house, a witness heard him shoot the two family dogs. He exited the house with ammunition, survival equipment, and a flak jacket. He failed to start his car, and instead returned to the house and set the living room alight using the petrol he purchased from Froxfield. Leaving the house, he headed east on South View towards school playing fields. En route he shot and killed two of his neighbours, Roland and Sheila Mason, with the Type 56 and Beretta respectively. A fourteen-year-old girl, who also lived nearby, heard the noise and went to see what it was; Ryan shot her four times in the legs. She sought first aid from her mother and another nearby resident and survived. Ryan was chastised by a 77-year-old neighbour for "scaring everybody to death" for making noise, although he did not shoot her. Ryan then wounded Marjorie Jackson, one of the people who had seen him arrive home, in her back. She telephoned her friend George White for help, and asked him to collect her husband Ivor from work in Newbury.

Past the playing fields, Ryan walked along a footpath towards the town's common. He shot and killed 51-year-old Kenneth Clements with the Type 56. Clements had been walking his dog with his family; the family escaped without injury. At this time, approximately 12:50, police had linked the incident in Froxfield to the many calls they received in Hungerford and instead focused on South View. Ryan returned to South View from the common, and the first police officers to arrive aimed to close both ends of the road to contain a possible gunman. These officers were unarmed, and when Ryan saw the police response, he shot one of the officers, PC Roger Brereton, in the chest with the Beretta. Brereton, who was in his patrol car, crashed into a telegraph pole. At 12:58, Ryan shot and killed him with the Type 56 while he was using his radio to report an active shooter.

Still on South View, Ryan next shot at a mother and daughter who had just turned onto the lane in their Volvo. Both were struck, although the mother was able to reverse the car out of the road. Ryan next fired at the two-person crew of an ambulance that was responding to 999 calls on South View; both escaped without major injury. After this, two of Brereton's colleagues securing the east end of South View came upon Kenneth Clements's son, who informed them that the shooter had continued west on South View. They headed to investigate and Ryan shot at them; one took shelter in a house and the other – with Clements's son – drove across the common to safety. At 13:12, this officer radioed to request support from TVP's Tactical Firearms Unit (TFU) having seen the firearms Ryan was using. The TFU was on a training exercise in Otmoor, Oxfordshire (approximately 40 miles (60 km) from Hungerford) and would not have all its members in attendance until 14:20. The officer, PC Jeremy Wood, set up a makeshift command post on the common, approximately 500 yards (460 m) from South View.

Ryan next shot at George White, who was returning from Newbury with Ivor Jackson. White was driving his Toyota into South View when Ryan shot him with the Type 56; he was killed instantly. Jackson sustained severe injuries and feigned death but survived. Ryan then walked to the junction of South View and Fairview Road, where he used the Type 56 to shoot and kill 84-year-old Abdur (Note: Khan's name has also been reported Abdul and Abdul Rahman) Khan, who was tending his garden. After firing at and injuring a pedestrian on Fairview Road, Ryan headed back towards the common. One of the police officers in attendance made another 999 call, but by this point the telephone network had reached its capacity. On South View, Ryan's mother Dorothy, who had been out shopping and running errands, returned in her car to see Michael armed; she shouted for him to stop before he shot her four times, twice at point-blank range. (Note: Sources differ as to whether Ryan used the Type 56 or the Beretta to kill his mother) On heading towards the common, a resident of a parallel street shouted at Ryan to "kindly stop that racket"; he responded by shooting her in the groin. At 13:18 PC Wood was joined by two armed police officers at the command post on the common. Two minutes later, they saw Ryan at the War Memorial Recreation Grounds on the edge of the common.

==== Hungerford Common and town centre ====
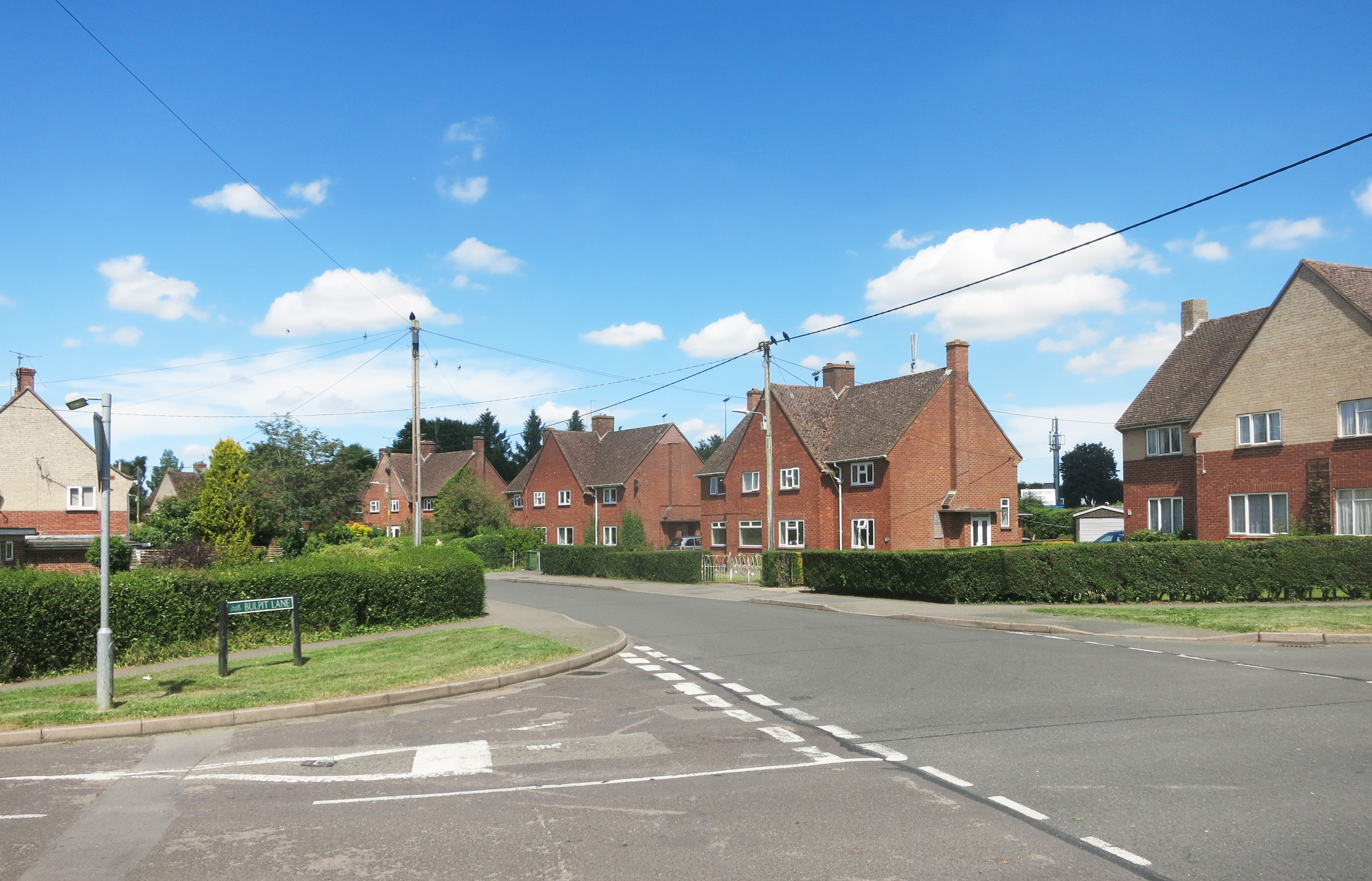
After shooting dead Marcus Barnard, Ryan headed north on Priory Avenue (away from the camera)

Near the War Memorial Recreation Grounds, Ryan shot and killed 26-year-old Francis Butler with the Type 56. At this point, Ryan discarded the carbine, it having been inoperable since the shooting in Froxfield. He also temporarily discarded the Type 56, possibly because of spent ammunition, before recovering it. The subsequent murders were committed with the Beretta.

On reaching Bulpit Lane, Ryan shot and killed taxi driver Marcus Barnard, who was in his cab. Ryan headed north on Priory Avenue, where he shot and injured the occupant of a parked van. By this time, police had set up road diversions, and some of Ryan's victims were drivers affected by these changes of route. Douglas and Kathleen Wainwright, visiting their son on Priory Avenue, were diverted to approach from the south, where Ryan was. Approximately 100 yards (90 m) from their destination, Ryan shot Douglas dead and injured Kathleen before non-fatally shooting at two other drivers. One of the fatalities on Priory Avenue, Douglas Wainwright, was the father of PC Trevor Wainwright, Hungerford's regular beat officer, who was off-duty at the time of the attack. Standing near Priory Avenue's junction with Tarrants Hill, Ryan shot at a van, killing Eric Vardy.

At 13:30, Ryan headed via Orchard Park Close to Priory Road, shooting at houses as he passed them. He then shot at a passing car on Priory Road and fatally injured the driver, 22-year-old Sandra Hill.

After shooting Hill, Ryan forced his way into a house further down Priory Road and shot the occupants, 66-year-old Jack Gibbs and his 62-year-old wife Myrtle. Jack was killed instantly, and Myrtle died two days later at the Princess Margaret Hospital in Swindon. Leaving the Gibbs' home, Ryan shot at houses opposite and injured the occupants. He then continued south on Priory Road where he shot once at a car driven by 34-year-old Ian Playle, who was fatally struck in the neck. His wife and their two children escaped injury; Playle died at the Radcliffe Infirmary in Oxford two days later.

At 13:45, the police helicopter arrived and broadcast warnings to the public. At this time, Ryan shot and injured a male outside a property on Priory Road.

=== Suicide ===
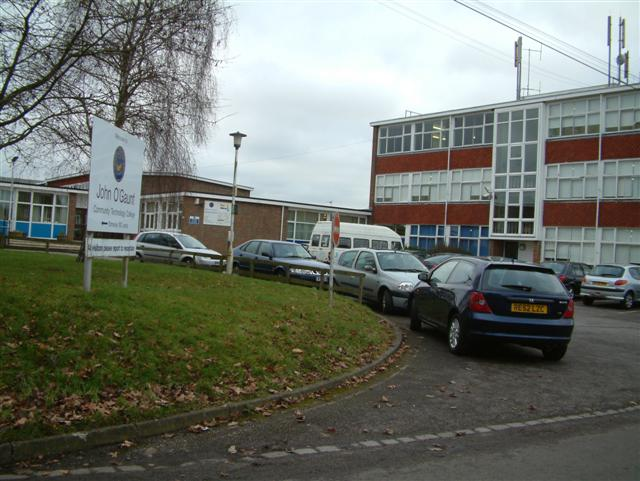
Ryan shot at helicopters from the classroom at the top-right of the three-storey building

Ryan was next seen further along Priory Road approaching John O'Gaunt School, which was closed for the summer holidays. The school's caretaker reported seeing a man enter one of the school buildings at 13:52, and the TFU secured gardens and houses in the area before surrounding the school at approximately 16:00. At 16:40 they heard gunshots in the vicinity of the school and more officers went to the scene. At least one further shot from a school building was heard at 17:15; these may have been aimed at the police and press helicopters. Ryan's precise location after the shooting at 13:45 had been unknown as there had been no confirmed sightings, but at approximately 17:26 police first saw him at the school shortly after he had thrown his Type 56 out of a third-floor window. Once containment of Ryan was confirmed, fire and ambulance crews were able to access the previously locked-down parts of the town, including the fire in South View, which had spread and destroyed the Ryans' home as well as the three other properties in the terrace.

Ryan fired at both police and helicopters that were circling above the school. He became engaged in conversation with a sergeant within the TFU and informed them of his arsenal and ammunition, claiming that he had a grenade as well as the Beretta. He said that he would not exit the building until the police informed him of the welfare of his mother and stated that "Hungerford must be a bit of a mess." The sergeant said he understood Ryan when he claimed that his mother's death was "a mistake". Ryan reportedly replied, "How can you understand? I wish I had stayed in bed." He later shouted, "It's funny. I killed all those people, but I haven't the guts to blow my own brains out." At 18:52, after a few minutes of silence, a shot was heard from the school building, and Ryan no longer responded to police. Without knowing the full extent of Ryan's arsenal and ammunition and with the possibility of booby traps or more perpetrators, the police stayed at their positions and devised an operation to enter the building. At 20:10, armed police entered a barricaded room to find Ryan dead of a self-inflicted gunshot through the right temple.

== Aftermath ==
The shootings were declared a major incident and in the immediate aftermath, TVP locked down many areas to secure evidence and exclude press activity. A CID headquarters was established at the force's premises in Sulhamstead, approximately 18 miles (30 km) east of Hungerford. They conducted a sweep search of the town, identifying 78 bullet holes in 15 vehicles. Investigations were supported by the force's Autoindex system, the HOLMES platform not yet implemented.

Prime Minister Margaret Thatcher visited Hungerford on the day after the massacre. She stated that "if [gun control laws] need to be tightened up [to] prevent more events like this, of course, that will be considered."

Funerals for the dead were conducted in the weeks after the tragedy, beginning with Eric Vardy's in Great Shefford on 26 August. Roger Brereton's funeral, held the following day at St Mary's Church in Shaw, Berkshire, was attended by Home Secretary Douglas Hurd. Dorothy Ryan was buried in Calne, Wiltshire, on 29 August. Michael Ryan was cremated at Reading Crematorium on 3 September, the location of his ashes known to only one member of his family.

=== Inquest and report ===
The inquest into the massacre concluded on 29 September. The coroner for West Berkshire, Charles Hoile, recognised the dichotomy of the nation wanting rapid police response to such events while also insisting on a routinely unarmed police force. The jury in the inquest recommended to the coroner that "semi-automatic weapons should not generally be available [and] an individual should not be allowed to own an unlimited quantity of arms and ammunition."

Hurd commissioned TVP's Chief Constable, Colin Smith, to prepare a report on the incident. The Hungerford Report found that on the day of the massacre, the town – which was usually policed by two sergeants and twelve constables – was policed by one sergeant, two patrol constables, and one station duty officer. It reported that such restrictions in personnel that day "could certainly have become a relevant factor had Ryan not been traced and contained rapidly."

Communication – both internally within the force as well as handling communications with the public – was criticised. Telephone exchanges could not handle the number of 999 calls made by witnesses; the Newbury exchange normally handled 300,000 calls per day but this increased to 800,000 on 19 August. Some witnesses' reports were significantly delayed which resulted in out-of-date or duplicate information being passed to emergency services. The public telephone network, as well as lines to the emergency services, were saturated. British Telecom implemented measures to relieve stress on the telecommunications network on the evening of 19 August, freeing up communications for the police. The force also used 13 mobile telephones; as with the landline network, Racal blocked the public from using the cellular network to allow the police's mobile phones to work.

The report stated that the police force helicopter was undergoing repairs, and its arrival at Hungerford at 13:45 was likely a catalyst for Ryan to seek refuge in the school. Smith said that the presence of helicopters other than the police's aircraft hampered operations; at least four private helicopters – most (if not all) from the press – were a distraction for the police pilot and made ground units unable to hear radio transmissions.

Regarding Ryan's firearms, the report determined that his weapon collection had been legally licensed. Smith concluded that "the public [...] will demand that this tragic event is used as a catalyst for changes in both the law and administrative procedures [of gun licencing]", and that neither "legitimate sporting [nor] leisure interests" would be seriously damaged nor significantly impeded if semi-automatic firearms were prohibited from general sale.

The report led to the Firearms (Amendment) Act 1988, which banned the ownership of semi-automatic centre-fire rifles and restricted the use of shotguns with a capacity of more than three cartridges (in magazine plus the breech). An amnesty held following the passing of the Act amassed 48,000 firearms.

In June 1988, PC Brereton was posthumously awarded the Queen's Commendation for Brave Conduct.

== Perpetrator ==
Michael Robert Ryan was born on 18 May 1960, at Savernake Hospital in Marlborough, Wiltshire, the only child of Alfred and Dorothy Ryan. His father (born 1904 or 1905) had worked for a local government agency as a building inspector and died from cancer in 1985 at the age of 80. Ryan's mother (born 1925 or 1926) worked as a school dinner lady and later as a waitress at the Elcot Park Hotel.

Ryan attended Hungerford Primary School and John O'Gaunt School before studying at Newbury College from the age of 16. After dropping out of college, some sources state that Ryan was at one point employed as an antique dealer, although this is not corroborated by the official report into the shootings. On 7 April 1987, he began employment as a labourer on a Manpower Services Commission scheme with Newbury District Council, working on footpaths and fences including at the River Thames in Reading. He left the job on 9 July, and returned to claiming benefits.

=== Firearms ownership ===
Ryan was issued a shotgun certificate on 2 February 1978, and on 11 December 1986 he was granted a firearm certificate covering the ownership of two pistols. The licence only permitted Ryan to use the weapons at approved ranges; his application stated that he would use them at the Dunmore Shooting Centre Club in Abingdon and he was also a member of the Wiltshire Shooting Centre rifle club in Devizes. He later applied to have the certificate amended to cover a third pistol, as he intended to sell one of the two he had acquired since the granting of the certificate (a Smith & Wesson .38-calibre revolver) and to buy two more. This was approved on 30 April 1987. On 14 July, he applied for another variation, to cover two semi-automatic rifles, which was approved on 30 July. At the time of the massacre, he was licensed to possess eight firearms, which he purchased between 17 December 1986 and 8 August 1987:

- Beretta 9mm pistol
- Zabala shotgun
- Browning shotgun
- Bernardelli .22 pistol (Note: Ryan sold the Bernardelli shortly before the shootings)
- CZ ORSO self-loading .32 ACP pistol (Note: The CZ pistol was being repaired at the time of the shootings)
- Norinco Type 56 7.62×39mm semi-automatic rifle (Note: The Type 56 was described as a Kalashnikov AK-47 copy, and was identified as a Kalashnikov in the report from Thames Valley Police to the Home Secretary)
- Underwood M1 carbine .30 rifle

Ryan used the Beretta, the Type 56, and the M1 carbine in the massacre, and fired at least 119 bullets. He predominantly used the Type 56, with which he fired 84 bullets.

The Norinco was purchased Westbury Guns, who had bought it from firearms dealer Mick Ranger.

Ryan showed some of his firearms – as well as improvised explosive devices – to his colleagues at his labouring job. As well as his target practice at legitimate venues, Ryan used a large road sign at the junction of the M4 and the A338.

=== Health and motive ===
In the hours following the massacre, newspapers speculated that Ryan was inspired by viewing "video nasties" despite there having been no opportunity to investigate such causes. The British tabloid press was filled with stories about Ryan's life; biographies stated that as well as watching violent videos he had a near-obsessive fascination with firearms and possessed magazines about survival skills and firearms, including Soldier of Fortune. The Rambo films were later suggested as inspiring Ryan, although there is no evidential link between fictional video violence and the subsequent enactment of actual physical violence.

Ryan had neither previous criminal convictions nor a record of medical problems. Following his death, Ryan's mental health came under analysis. Jim Higgins, a consultant forensic psychiatrist, suspected that Ryan had acute schizophrenia, describing how "matricide is the schizophrenic crime". A psychologist in BBC One's The Hungerford Massacre documentary described how Ryan had "anger and contempt for ordinary life".

Although no motive for the massacre has been determined, psychologist Craig Jackson of Birmingham City University has suggested that Ryan may have been sexually motivated in his attack on Godfrey in Savernake Forest; the presence of a groundsheet 10 yards (9 m) from where her body was found may have meant that Ryan intended to sexually assault her. Jackson believes that the shootings that followed were not planned as Ryan had no manifesto, but may have been the result of a desire to control. He may have been influenced, however, by the Hoddle Street massacre in Melbourne, Australia, 10 days previously.

Investigative psychologist Keith Ashcroft likened the massacre to the shootings at Dunblane in 1996 and Cumbria in 2010, stating that "the killers [were] subject to gossip and sometimes quite serious victimisation. Their rage at perceived injustice is way beyond that of a normal person, but they have not lost touch with reality." Ashcroft differed from Higgins on the possibility of psychosis, stating that "[spree killers] are not psychotic. Isolation, emptiness, is solved by taking control. And the ultimate control is that exercised over life and death. Finally, they externalise their rage, targeting family and society."

== Legacy ==
The massacre remains, along with the 1996 Dunblane school massacre and the 2010 Cumbria shootings, one of the deadliest mass shootings in the UK, and the name "Hungerford" has become synonymous with the massacre.

The Hungerford Tragedy Gardens, adjacent to the town's war memorial, were established to memorialise the victims of the massacre. Most residents of Hungerford refer to the events as "the tragedy". In the BBC Radio 4 series Aftermath, a local stated that "[someone] called it the 'massacre' [...] that is so offensive to people in Hungerford – it was the Hungerford Tragedy – we've always called it the Hungerford Tragedy". Conversely, Marjorie Jackson – who was injured on South View – does not view the events as a tragedy, stating "It was a massacre [...] there's no two ways about it."

=== Cultural references ===
==== In books ====
- The main character of J. G. Ballard's novel Running Wild is a Deputy Psychiatric Advisor with the Metropolitan Police Service who authored "an unpopular minority report on the Hungerford killings" and is sent to investigate mass murder in a gated community.
- The massacre inspired Christopher Priest's 1998 novel The Extremes.
- Forensic pathologist Richard Shepherd, whose first case was the massacre, covered the Hungerford massacre in his 2019 memoir Unnatural Causes.

==== In music ====
- "Sulk", the penultimate track on Radiohead's album The Bends, was written as a response to the massacre.
- Radical Dance Faction vocalist Chris Bowsher, who witnessed the massacre, wrote the band's songs "Hot on the Wire" and "Hungerford Poem" about the killings.

==== In television and radio ====
- In December 2004, BBC Two aired a documentary on the massacre.
- The massacre was the subject of a 2017 episode of the BBC Radio 4 documentary series Aftermath.

== See also ==
- List of massacres in Great Britain
- List of rampage killers
- Port Arthur massacre, a spree killing in Australia in 1996 which prompted similar gun law reforms
- Ughill Hall shootings, which occurred eleven months earlier
- 1987 Redfield and Patchway spree killings, which occurred two months later and were reportedly inspired by the Hungerford massacre
- Southcliffe
