= Whitchurch, Bristol =

Area of Bristol, England

Coordinates: 51.4064°N 2.5594°W

Whitchurch
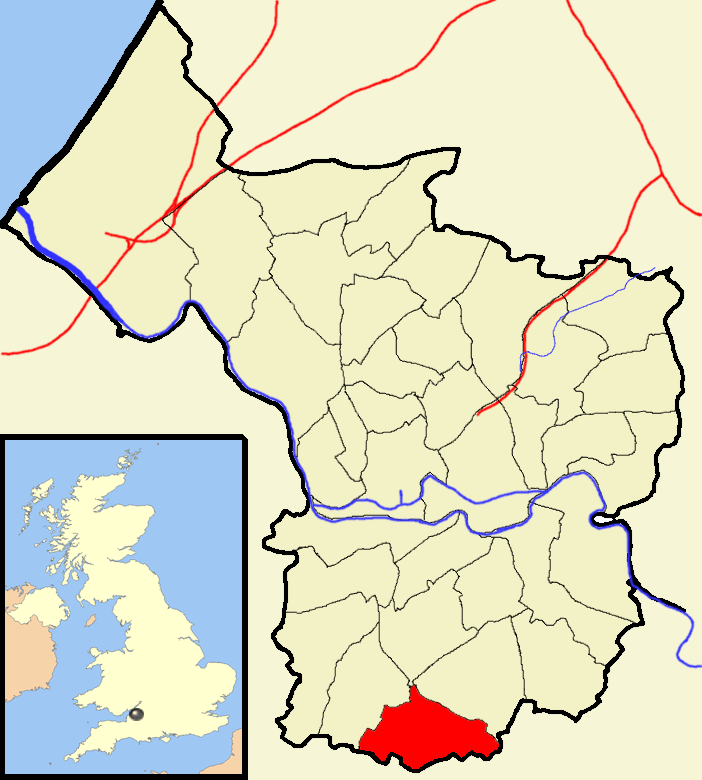
- Boundaries of the city council ward.
- Population: 11,061 (2001)
- OS grid reference: ST611676
- Unitary authority: Bristol (Whitchurch Park only), Bath and North East Somerset
- Ceremonial county: Somerset and Bristol
- Region: South West
- Country: England
- Sovereign state: United Kingdom
- Post town: BRISTOL
- Postcode district: BS14
- Dialling code: 01275
- UK Parliament: Bristol South (Whitchurch Park only), North East Somerset and Hanham
- Website: Village Council

Whitchurch is a village in north Somerset, England and an adjoining suburb of southern Bristol, bounded by Hartcliffe to the west and Hengrove and Knowle to the north. The suburb was initially developed during the 1930s.

The A37 road, which passes through Whitchurch, links Bristol with Dorchester. Within Bristol the A37 is known as Wells Road, and was one of the first dual carriageways to be built in Bristol.

== History ==
The name means "the white church", and was first recorded in 1230. Another source dated about 1500 may be a copy of a record dated to 1065. The village church, St Nicholas, was built on the site of a chapel dedicated to St. White, which presumably provides the origin of the village name.

The village in its present location dates from about the 12th century, when the centre of population of an older village named Filton, Filwood or Felton, west of the present village, moved to the present site. The parish was still sometimes known as Felton as late as the 19th century. The parish of Whitchurch was part of the Keynsham Hundred in Somerset.

John Collinson, who was vicar of Long Ashton and curate of Whitchurch, provided a history of the village, together with a description of its present state, in 1791.

The area became a civil parish in 1866. The northern parts of the civil parish were transferred to Bristol in the 1930s and 1951. From then, Whitchurch was divided between a suburb of Bristol and a village outside the city in Somerset.

== The suburb of Bristol ==
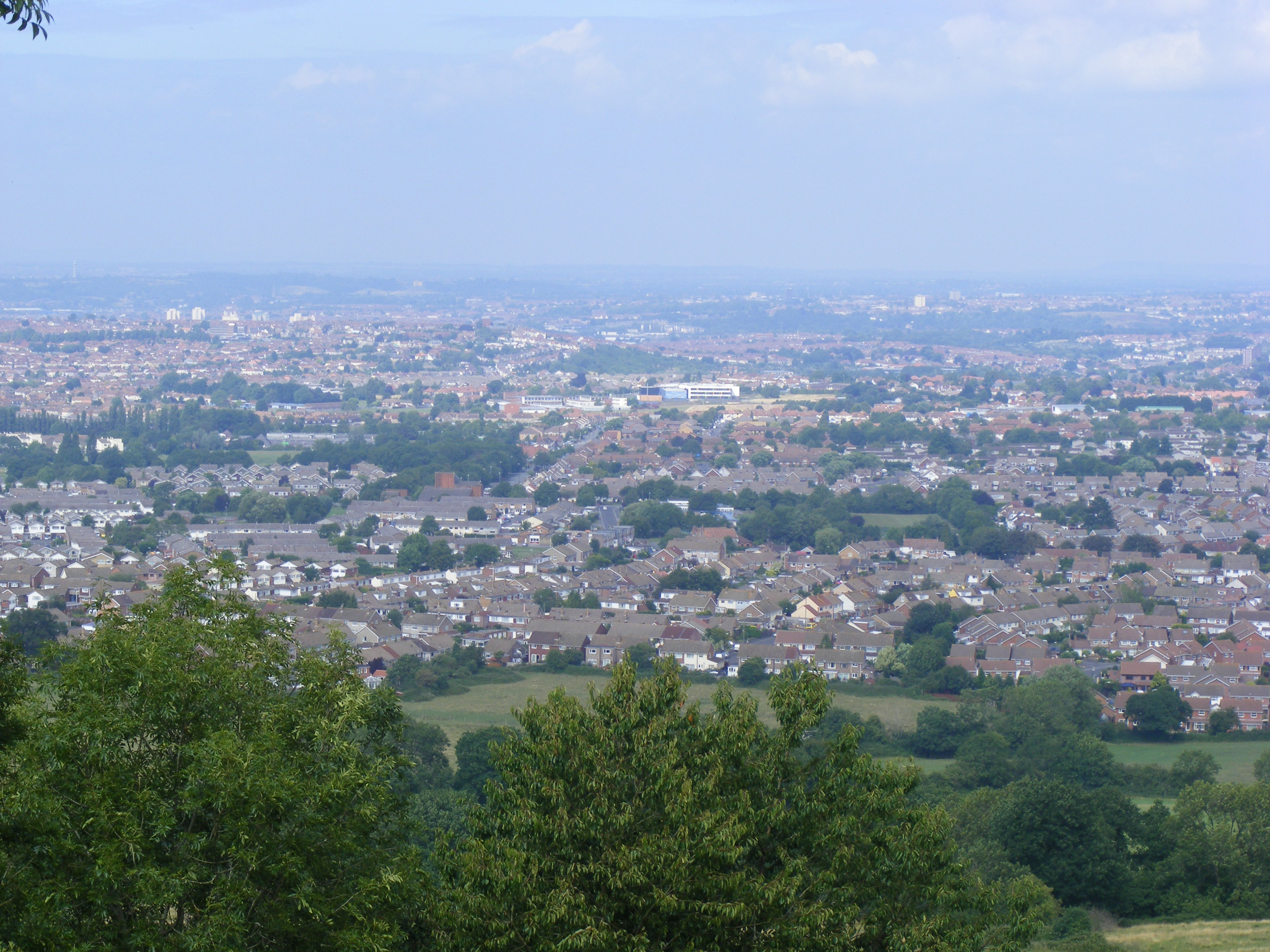
Whitchurch taken from Maes Knoll

The suburb now lies in the Hengrove and Whitchurch Park electoral ward.

The suburb is one of only two parts of Bristol not to use the 0117 dialling code. Along with Stockwood, Whitchurch numbers use the 01275 code of north Somerset instead.

Facilities close by include the Hengrove Leisure Park which has various restaurants and food retailers. Adjacent to the leisure park is Hawkfield Business Park, a significant source of commerce and employment for the suburb.

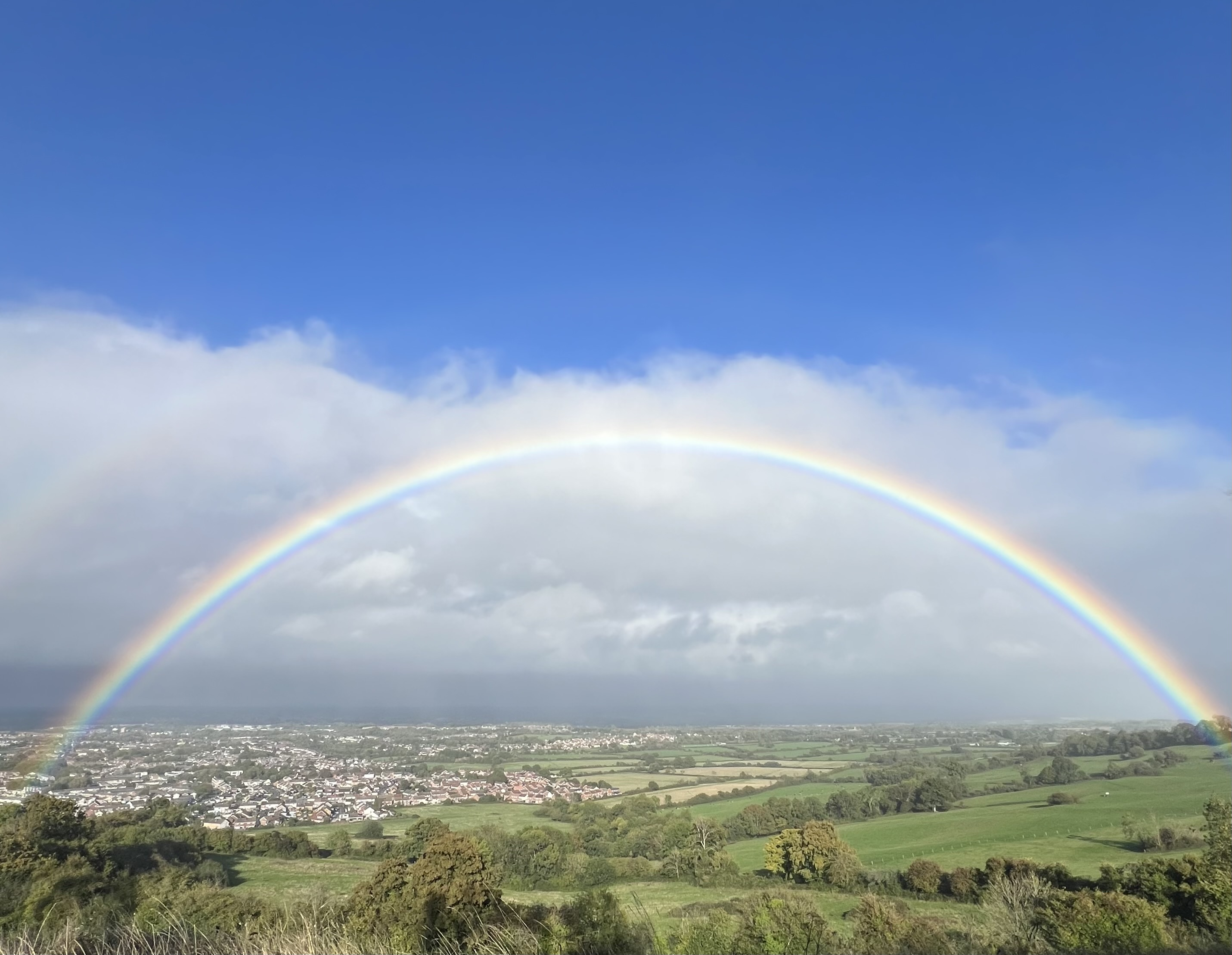
Whitchurch taken from Dundry

The suburb is home to the Whitchurch Sports Centre, and used to be an occasional venue for pro-boxing bouts. It has a dilapidated Whitchurch athletics stadium. The sports centre is also earmarked for demolition, once the new sports centre and Olympic-size swimming pool are finished, as part of the expanded Hengrove Leisure Park redevelopment. In October 2006, Whitchurch Sports Centre was taken over by Action Sport UK, a South African company. Some of Whitchurch Sports Centre's activities are now based at Withywood Sports Centre and Ashton Park School Sports Centre. The suburb is also home to rugby union club Bristol Barbarians who reside in Norton lane. The club currently play in Somerset 1 and are coached by Steve Penfold. Whitchurch is also the birthplace of famous snooker player and world champion Judd Trump.

On 2 August 2005 the beginnings of a tornado (a funnel) floated in the skies above South Bristol. As it did not touch it cannot be classed as a tornado but nevertheless it provided an unusual yet impressive sight for the residents of Whitchurch and surrounding parts of Bristol, such as Stockwood.

== The village ==
The village of Whitchurch is a civil parish in the unitary authority of Bath and North East Somerset. In the 2001 census the civil parish had a population of 1,354.

Between 1925 and 1959 the village was served by Whitchurch Halt, a station on the Bristol and North Somerset Railway.

== Church ==
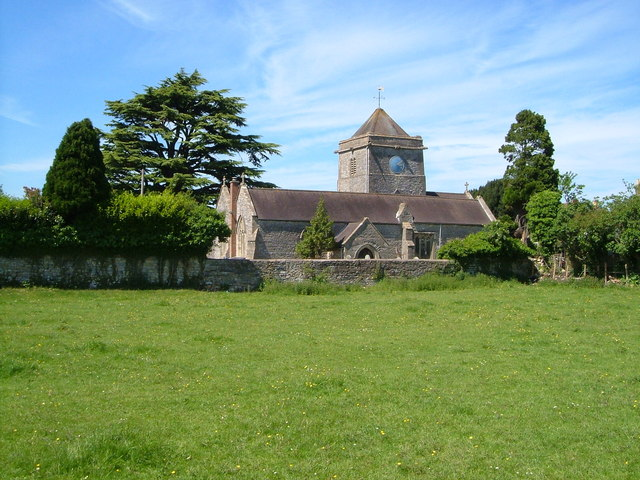
St Nicholas Church, Whitchurch

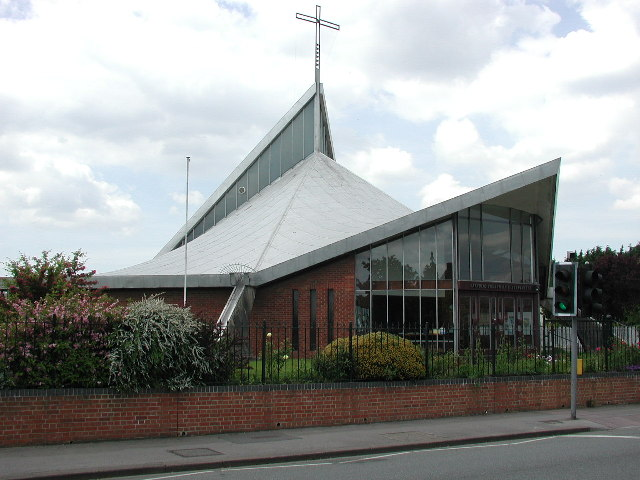
St Bernadette's Catholic Church, Whitchurch

The ecclesiastical parish includes both the civil parish in Somerset and the suburb in Bristol. The parish church is in the village in Somerset, and is dedicated to St Nicholas. St. Augustine's Church on Whitchurch Lane was opened in 1972 but closed in 2007.

== Airport ==
Whitchurch Airport was on the land which is now home to the Hengrove Leisure Park. The airport was used before World War II by domestic scheduled flights. During the war it was the base for various types of military aircraft (which flew from there on various missions) and civilian aircraft (which were moved there to avoid their destruction at more vulnerable airports such as Croydon). Whitchurch Airport and Liverpool Airport were the only civil airports in England to remain in use during World War II. Imperial Airways (later BOAC) flew to Lisbon in neutral Portugal: at one time in 1941 there were 1200 people waiting for a flight to Lisbon. There were also a large number of espionage flights to France and elsewhere in occupied Europe.

After the war, Bristol needed a larger airport. Farmland in Lulsgate was purchased and Lulsgate Airport (later to be Bristol Airport) was opened. For a short time from 1959, the old airport was used as a motor racing circuit called Whitchurch Circuit, for Formula Two and Formula Three races.
