= St Augustine's Church, Whitchurch, Bristol =

Church building in Bristol, England

St. Augustine's Church, Whitchurch
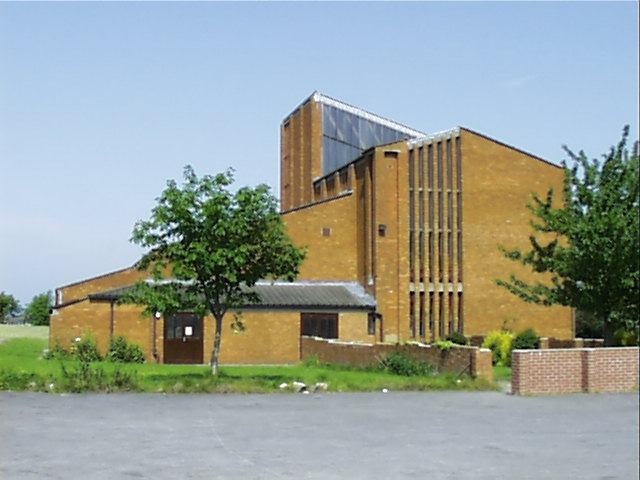
- The church in 2000, shortly before closure

- Location within Bristol

Religion
- Affiliation: Anglican
- District: Diocese of Bristol
- Ecclesiastical or organizational status: parish church, currently closed
- Leadership: Canon Nicholas Hay
- Year consecrated: 1972

Location
- Location: Bristol, England
- Interactive map of St. Augustine's Church, Whitchurch
- Coordinates: 51.407°N 2.571°W

Architecture
- Completed: 1972
- Materials: brick, concrete

St. Augustine's Church was a Church of England church located on Whitchurch Lane in Whitchurch, Bristol.

== History ==
=== Construction ===
The church was built in 1972 to cater for the expansion of Whitchurch Parish in the suburb of south Bristol, England, UK.

=== Closure ===
St Augustine's Church had many structural problems from its initial construction. The bell tower was unsafe and removed in the eighties. Rainwater had penetrated the roof after lead was stolen. In 2004 the city council planners gave consent to demolish the church and build a new structure. The church was deemed unsafe in 2007 and closed.

== Re-build ==
Parishioners hoped to raise up to £50,000 towards the £350,000 cost of the new church. Following concerns about the lack of progress, Canon Nicholas Hay was appointed as caretaker minister. Construction work on a new church was completed in 2016. In 2021 the reverend Sam Sheppard was appointed priest in charge of the new team of St Augustines Whitchurch and Christ Church Hengrove

== Archives ==
Records for St Augustine's church, Whitchurch are held at Bristol Archives (Ref. P.WchStA) (online catalogue) consisting of one marriage register and two service registers.

== See also ==
- List of churches in Bristol
