= Whitchurch Circuit =

Former motor racing circuit in Bristol, England

Coordinates: 51.413°N 2.586°W

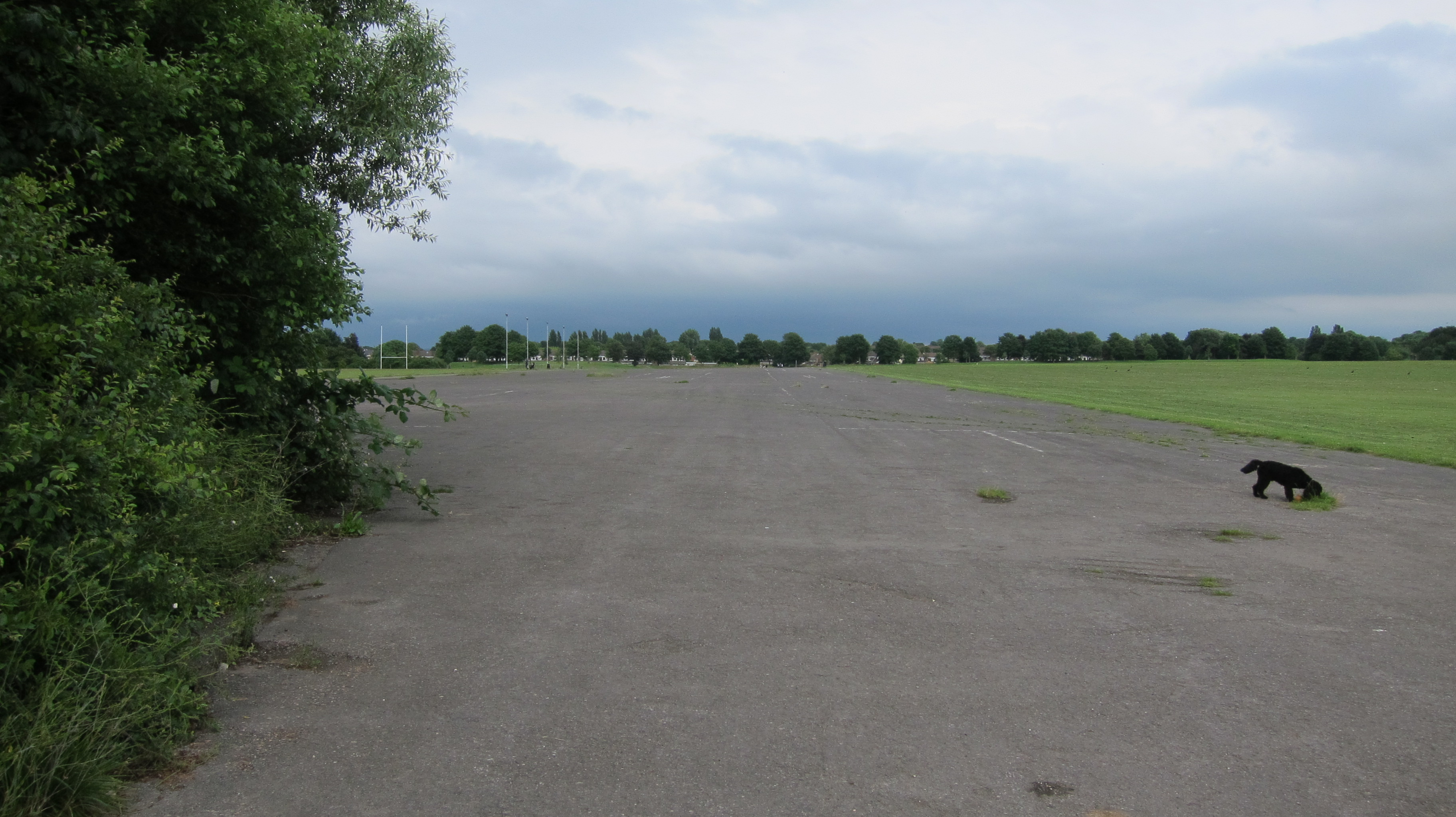
- Location: Bristol, England
- Opened: 1959
- Major events: Formula 2, Formula III
- Race lap record: 53.01 (72.17 mph) (Jack Pitcher, Cooper, 1959)

Whitchurch Circuit was a motor racing circuit located at the former Bristol (Whitchurch) Airport in Bristol, England.

The Bristol and Wessex Aeroplane Club first flew from this airfield in 1930. During World War II it was used by the Air Transport Auxiliary and British Overseas Airways Corporation. It continued as Bristol's commercial airport until in 1957 this moved to Bristol Lulsgate Airport, where the Lulsgate Circuit had been.

On 1 August 1959, the Bristol Motorcycle and Light Car Club (BM&LCC) organised the first race meeting in conjunction with the Bristol Corporation, who owned the then disused airfield at Whitchurch. The course was 1.0625 miles (1.71 km) long, almost flat, and rectangular in shape with four corners known as Dundry, Hangar, Knowle, and Goram. The meeting consisted of six races, one of which was for Formula Two cars. This race was won by Henry Taylor, at a speed of 66.03 mph (106.26 km/h), from Keith Greene and Tim Parnell, all of whom were Cooper mounted. The fastest lap was set by Taylor at 66.64 mph (107.25 km/h). However, the fastest lap of the day was set by a Formula III car in exactly 53 seconds (72.17 mph (116.15 km/h)) by Jack Pitcher in a race won by Philip Robinson (Stuart-Cooper). It is probable that this is the outright all-time lap record at this track at Whitchurch as this may have been the only car meeting held here, though it is possible that another was held later in this year.

The report of the meeting in Autosport speaks of indifferent weather with only the first and last races being run on a dry track, which probably accounts for the Formula III cars being faster than the Formula 2.

The following weekend, 8 August 1959, the Bristol Motor Cycle Club held a motor-cycle race meeting, with Phil Read winning both the 350cc and 500cc abroad Nortons, taking fastest lap in both at 69.25 mph (111.45 km/h) and 72.07 mph (115.99 km/h) respectively. Note that this fastest lap was only 0.1 mph (0.16 km/h) slower than Jack Pitcher's outright lap, also using a Norton engine in his Cooper.

In 1937, on 22 May, the BM&LCC ran a one-off Speed Trail on the approach road to Whitchurch. The 17-foot-wide (5.2 m) course was 750 yd (690 m) long with a slight right followed by a long left-hand bend.

== Results – main events ==
Year	Date	Winning driver	Winning constructor	Class
1959	1 August	(England) Henry Taylor	Cooper	Formula Two
1959	8 August	(England) Phil Read	Norton	500cc
