= Mick Ranger =

British firearms dealer

- Born: Michael George Allan Ranger; November 1946 (age 78–79); United Kingdom
- Occupation: Firearms dealer

Michael George Allan Ranger (born November 1946) is a British firearms dealer. He founded IDSC (International Defence Security Company) and has been involved with several large arms deals with several countries.

== Biography ==
Born in 1947, Ranger runs Imperial Defence Services, which is based in Takeley, Essex. His firm has operations in Bulgaria, Cyprus, Nigeria, Australia, South Africa and Vietnam. The company website states:

Apart from countless transactions involving small arms in general, we have completed transactions for Surface to Air Missiles, Anti-tank weapons and a large quantity of Missile Warhead Fuses, Rifle Grenades and Heavy Machine Guns.

— Imperial Defence Services Website

The website does not quote prices, although it is claimed that it previously stated the company sold grenade-launchers for £450, and a collection of rifles from £195 to a £20,000 General Electric Minigun.

== Companies ==
Mr. Ranger seems to have something to do with a series of related companies that are all headquartered in the same location.

- Ranger Arms Company Ltd. (existing 28 April 1987 - 13 August 2013)
- F.R. Ordnance International Ltd. (existing 16 March 1990 - September 23, 2003): The initials F and R represent the last names of its two company officers: Gregory Saul Felton (Director), and Michael George Allan Ranger (Secretary).
- Ranger Pistol Products Ltd. (existing 16 May 1995 – 3 March 2023) The company is named after Ranger, its founder and first director. It had its firearm components made in Vietnam and then assembled in Sheffield.
- Imperial Defence Services Ltd. (existing 16 May 1995 – 7 March 2023)
- Imperial Defence Services (Holdings) Ltd. (existing 17 February 1997 – 23 September 2003)
- London Arms Company, Ltd. (existing 3 November 2005 – 18 June 2013)

== Disputed dealings ==
In 2003, The Guardian published a report suggesting that Ranger was willing to sell arms to an undercover reporter posing as an agent wanting arms for a peace-keeping operation near the Iraqi border in Syria. The reporter made it clear that the weapons might be used in Iraq, but Ranger had no qualms with selling the weapons. Ranger made it clear he was aware of UN arms restrictions and told the undercover reporter that, "he would not agree to any deal where Iraq was mentioned in official documents," and that the end user certificate would require, "conclusive wording... that the guns being supplied will stay in Syria and will only be used by people so authorised by the Syrian government."

== Hungerford massacre ==
The Hungerford massacre occurred in Hungerford, Berkshire, England, on 19 August 1987. A 27-year-old unemployed local labourer, Michael Ryan, armed with several licensed weapons, including a semi-automatic Type 56, shot and killed 16 people. The Type 56 had been legally sold to Ryan by Westbury Guns. Westbury Guns got them from Ranger, the sole UK importer of the weapon, who dealt directly with the manufacturer, Norinco.

== Prison sentence ==
Ranger was sentenced in July 2012 to three-and-a-half years imprisonment for setting up a deal to sell missiles and handguns from North Korea to Azerbaijan. There is a ban on exporting arms to Azerbaijan that has been in place since 1992.
