= Bristol and Wessex Aeroplane Club =

Flying club based in Bristol, United Kingdom

- Type: Limited company
- Industry: Flying training
- Founded: 8 October 1927
- Headquarters: Bristol Airport, Lulsgate Bottom, North Somerset, England, United Kingdom
- Services: Trial Flights, self-fly hire, PPL, LAPL, IMC rating, Night rating, Multi Engine Piston
- Website: bristolandwessex.co.uk

The Bristol and Wessex Aeroplane Club is a flying club based at Bristol Airport, providing plane hire, flying instruction and a ground school for general aviation. The club was formed in 1927 and officially opened by the Air Minister, Sir Samuel Hoare, on 8 October of that year.

== Operations ==
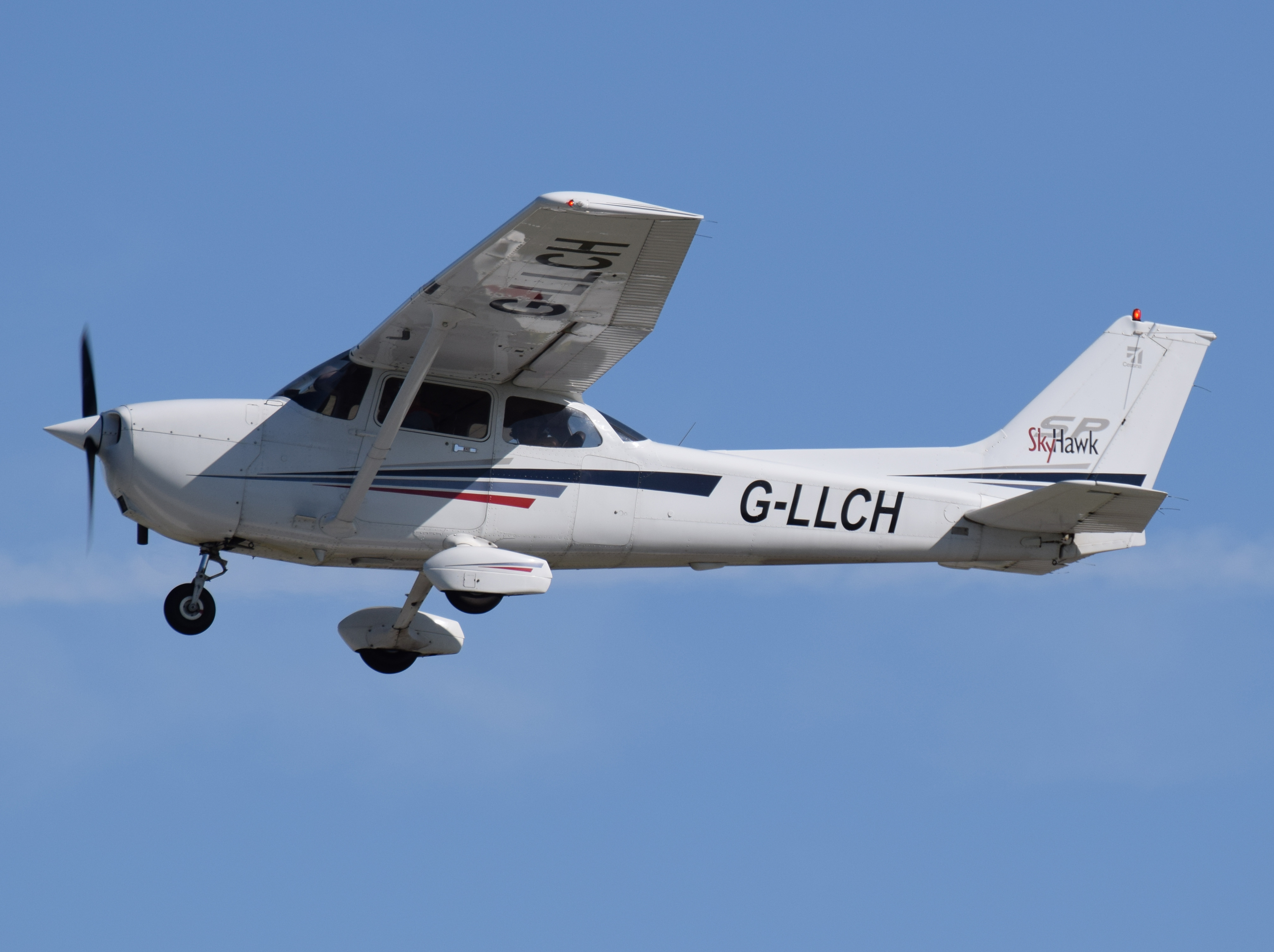
Charlie Hotel, Bristol and Wessex's Cessna 172S pictured in 2014

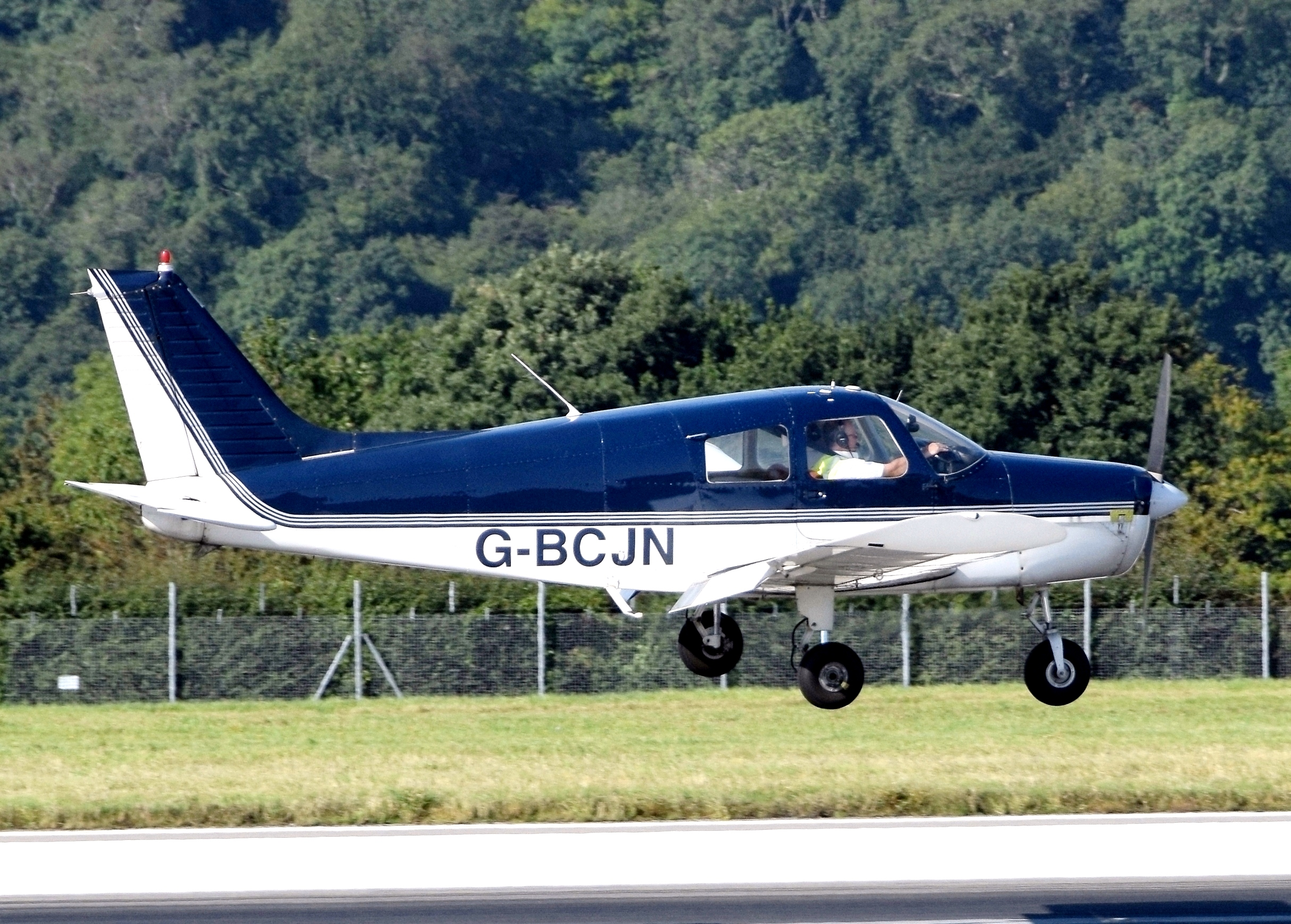
Piper PA-28-140 Cherokee Cruiser of the Bristol & Wessex Aeroplane Club lands at Bristol Airport, England (picture in 2016). Built 1974.

The Bristol and Wessex Aeroplane Club operates from the Bristol Flying School building in the Silver Zone of Bristol Airport, where it has classrooms and a restaurant.

The club provides trial flights, self-fly hire and professional flying training. They instruct for the Private Pilot Licence, NPPL, LAPL, the IMC rating, night tating and multi-engine piston rating.
