= Newbury College (England) =

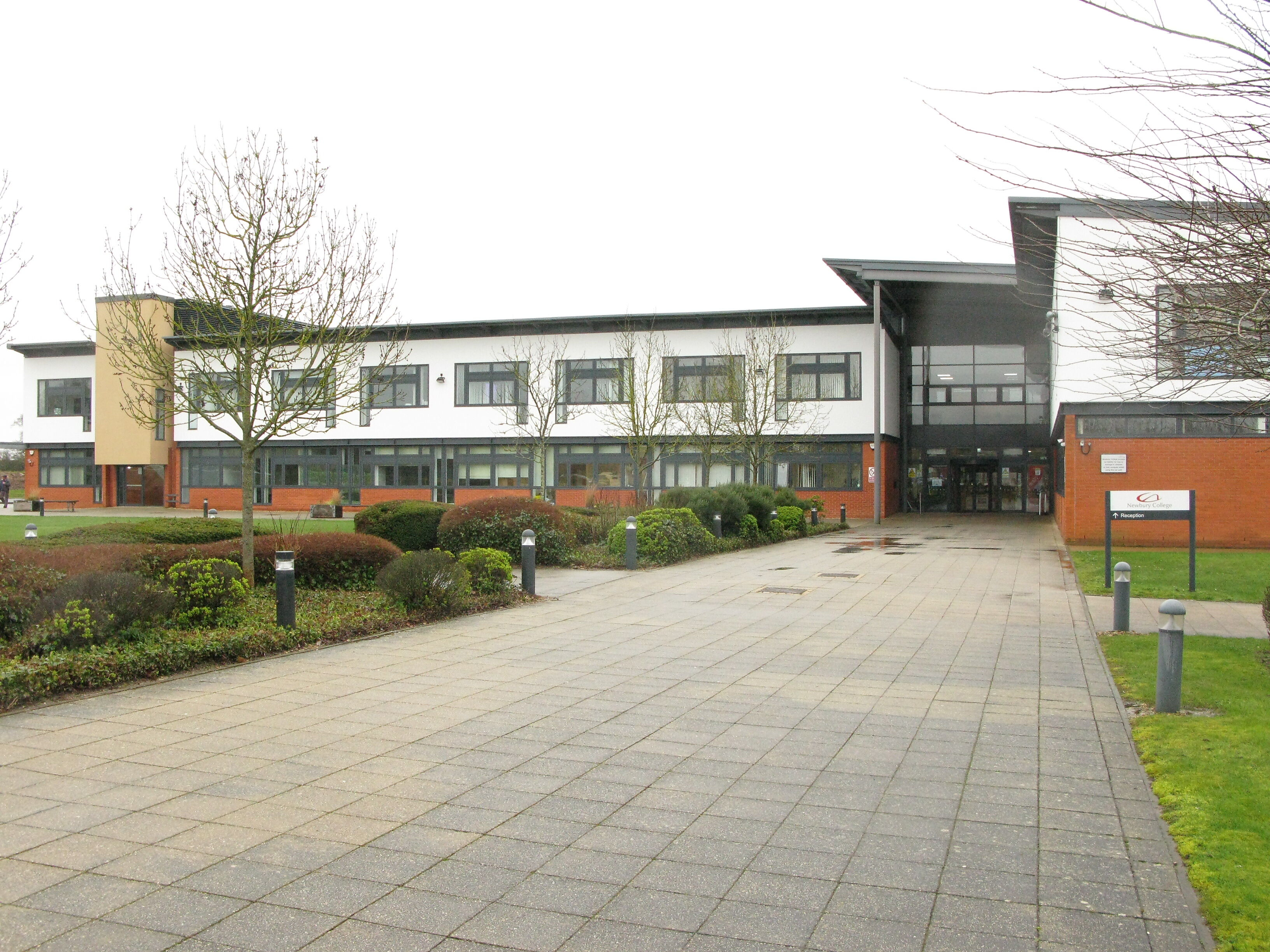

Location
- Monks Lane; Newbury, Berkshire, RG14 7TD; England; 51°22′57″N 1°19′22″W

Information
- Type: Further Education college
- Established: 2002
- Department for Education URN: 130602 Tables
- Ofsted: Reports
- Principal: Iain Wolloff
- Gender: Mixed
- Age: 16 to 99
- Website: newbury-college.ac.uk

Newbury College is a college of further education in the southern outskirts of Newbury, Berkshire, England, for anyone aged 16 or over.

== Courses ==
The College offers a wide range of academic and vocational full and part-time courses to school leavers and adult learners. Part-time courses are delivered at venues across West Berkshire. Courses include GCSEs, NVQs, BTECs and apprenticeships. The College also offers a provision for higher education courses, including courses linked with Reading University and Buckinghamshire New University.

== Monks Lane campus ==
The campus at Monks Lane offers fully equipped rooms for meetings and conferences. The classrooms also offer space for meetings. A regular shuttle bus service operates between the College and Thatcham via Newbury railway station and Newbury high street during term time.

=== The Forum ===
A centre for dance, drama and events, its performance hall can seat up to 120. It opens out to a courtyard and terraced seating area, enabling performances to take place to an outside audience in good weather.

=== Horticultural garden ===
Officially opened by Lady Carnarvon in 2006, the garden, used for learning about planting, growing and cultivating flowers and vegetables, has a greenhouse, polytunnels and fully accessible raised flowerbeds.

=== Intuition Salons ===
Hair and Beauty salons provide a commercial environment for students to learn and are open to members of the public for treatments. In the hair salon, students learn how to wash hair, and do hair highlights, braid hair, a ponytail and a Brazilian blowdry. In the nail salon students learn how to do manicures and pedicures, how to do massages and how to wax the body, do eyelash tints, eyebrow tints, facials and apply make-up.

=== The Restaurant ===
The College has a purpose-built, air conditioned training kitchen for students studying catering and hospitality. Alongside the training kitchen is a fully functioning restaurant that is open to members of the public.

=== Sports hall ===
The sports hall is used by the students for a variety of sporting activities. It is used by members of the public outside of College hours for club-based activities.
