= List of books about the Columbine High School massacre =

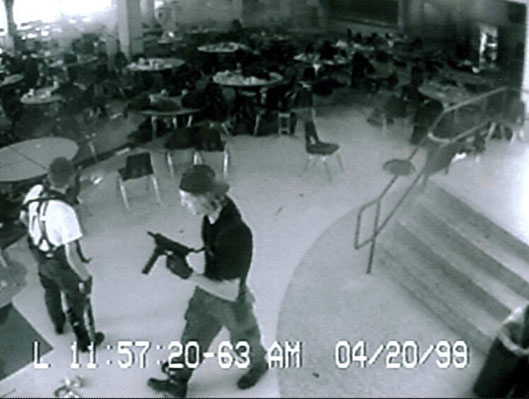
Harris (left) and Klebold (right) inside the cafeteria during the massacre

On April 20, 1999, high school seniors Eric Harris and Dylan Klebold walked into Columbine High School and shot and killed 13 students and one teacher, injuring 23 others. After the massacre, a large number of books were written about it. The topics range from survivors and former students, such as Brooks Brown, writing on his experience in the massacre in a book titled No Easy Answers; he also wrote about his friendships with Harris and Klebold and how he fell out with Harris. Sue Klebold, the mother of Dylan Klebold, wrote a book titled A Mother's Reckoning, where she talked about her life in the aftermath of the massacre, such as trying to understand Klebold's actions and having to live with the guilt. She also talked about her experience with Klebold and his behavior as he was growing up.

Notably, a significant amount of books were written about Rachel Scott, the first victim of the massacre (killed by Eric Harris). A foundation named Rachel's Challenge was set up by Darrell Scott; its goal is to keep the memory of Scott alive by spreading positive messages. Cassie Bernall, another victim, gained widespread attention after a book titled She Said Yes: The Unlikely Martyrdom of Cassie Bernall was published in 1999 by Bernall's mother, Misty Bernall. The book's title is referring to Bernall's supposed last words to Eric Harris when he asked, "Do you believe in God?" into which she responded with "Yes". Although after the book was published, it was revealed that this interaction was most likely not with Bernall but instead with another student named Valeen Schnurr, who survived.

== List ==
Title	Author(s)	Year	Ref
She Said Yes: The Unlikely Martyrdom of Cassie Bernall	Misty Bernall	1999	
Rachel's Tears	Darrell Scott, Beth Nimmo, Steve Rabey	2000	
Chain Reaction: A Call to Compassionate Revolution	Darrell Scott, Steve Rabey	2001	
Parents Under Siege	James Garbarino	2001	
Nobody Left to Hate	Elliot Aronson	2001	
No Easy Answers: The Truth Behind Death at Columbine	Brooks Brown, Rob Merritt	2002	
Rachel Smiles: The Spiritual Legacy of Columbine Martyr Rachel Scott	Darrell Scott	2002	
A Columbine Survivor’s Story	Marjorie Lindholm, Peggy Lindholm	2005	
I Asked, God Answered	Mark Taylor	2006	
Comprehending Columbine	Ralph Larkin	2007	
The Journals of Rachel Joy Scott	Debra Klingsporn, Beth Nimmo	2009	
Why Kids Kill: Inside the Minds of School Shooters	Peter F. Langman	2009	
Columbine	Dave Cullen	2009	
Columbine: A True Crime Story	Jeff Kass	2009	
Walking in Daniel's Shoes	Tom Mauser	2012	
A Mother's Reckoning	Sue Klebold	2016	
They Call Me Mr. De	Frank DeAngelis	2019	

== See also ==
- Columbine effect – the legacy and impact of the Columbine High School massacre
