= No Easy Answers =

2002 book by Brooks Brown and Rob Merritt

- Authors: Brooks Brown; Rob Merritt
- Publisher: Lantern Books
- Publication date: October 2002
- Pages: 284
- ISBN: 978-1-59056-031-0
- Dewey Decimal: 373.78882

No Easy Answers: The Truth Behind Death at Columbine is a 2002 non-fiction book by Brooks Brown and Rob Merritt about the Columbine High School massacre. Brown was a student at Columbine High School at the time of the shooting and a friend of the perpetrators, Eric Harris and Dylan Klebold. The book recounts Brown's experiences growing up as close friends with Klebold, his time as a student at Columbine, and his experiences with media, police, and school authorities following the shooting.

No Easy Answers tells Brown's personal story of growing up with Klebold, befriending and falling out with Harris, and surviving the massacre. The book does not offer a definitive explanation for the shooting, but rather reflects on its impact and implications. Throughout the book, Brown portrays both himself and Klebold as the subjects of extreme bullying from other students, and this as a widespread phenomenon at Columbine. He also portrays Harris as violent and refers in particular to death threats Harris made against him online, which his family reported to the police, but which were never followed up on. The second part of the book focuses on Brown's life following the massacre, including false accusations against him by John Stone, then the sheriff of Jefferson County, Colorado, of being an accomplice to it and the impact they had on his life.

Brown felt coverage of the shooting underrecognized the role which bullying played and that others at Columbine were downplaying the hostility present at the school. No Easy Answers focuses on bullying as the proximate cause of Columbine, criticising other common hypotheses such as media violence or anti-religious sentiment. The book depicts the school's social environment as antagonistic to atypical or nonconformist students, in particular those who were non-athletic or perceived as gay. It focuses more on reflective and emotional recollection than on strictly-factual reporting, alternating between Brown's personal narrative and more factual sections by its co-author Merritt.

No Easy Answers was co-written by Brown and Rob Merritt, then the editor of Marshalltown, Iowa's local newspaper. It was published in October 2002 through the nonprofit organization and publisher Lantern Books. One of the first works to analyze Columbine, No Easy Answers has been considered an influence on later works and a significant publication in and of itself. Its status as a memoir by the friend of a mass murderer is the subject of much of its critical analysis, which recognizes it as a substantial addition to the corpus of Columbine-related literature, but criticises its prose and its focus on bullying to the exclusion of other explanations.

== Background and publication ==
Brooks, I like you now. Get out of here. Go home.

— Eric Harris's final words to Brooks Brown on the morning of April 20, 1999

The Columbine High School massacre was a school shooting and attempted bombing committed by two Columbine students, Eric Harris and Dylan Klebold, on April 20, 1999. After smuggling a number of improvised explosives onto campus, most of which failed to operate, Harris and Klebold shot and killed twelve students and one teacher before turning the guns on themselves. At the time, it was the deadliest school shooting in American history. The Columbine shooting had significant effects on education, policy, copycat crime, and media and cultural portrayals of school violence. Columbine affected decision-making around school security, active shooter response protocols, anti-bullying policy, and religion in schools.

Brooks Brown, a fellow student at Columbine, had been close friends with Klebold since elementary school. Brown was the son of a real estate agent who had purchased a house in the Jefferson County Public Schools district (which housed Columbine High School) due to its good reputation. He and Klebold met in the first grade; the Brown and Klebold families became close, and both boys spent much of their time with one another both in and out of school. Brown and Harris became friends in their first year of high school, but their relationship was more chaotic; a temporary falling-out led to Harris making death threats towards Brown. They repaired their friendship a short time before the shootings.

Brown faced pervasive bullying throughout his school years. He felt coverage of the shooting underrecognized the role which bullying played and that others at Columbine were attempting to "rewrite history" by downplaying the hostility present at the school. Brown also believed that the shooting was preventable, and that authorities had ignored warning signs. A year prior to the massacre, Brown's parents had reported threats made by Harris against their son to the Jefferson County sheriff's office. Though these threats were not investigated during Harris's lifetime, they were used as grounds to obtain a search warrant of his home following the shooting.

No Easy Answers was co-written by Brown and Rob Merritt, then the editor of Marshalltown, Iowa's local newspaper. Merritt, who focused on education-related reporting, met Brown online after becoming "fascinated" with the Columbine shooting. It was published in October 2002 through the nonprofit organization and publisher Lantern Books.

== Synopsis ==
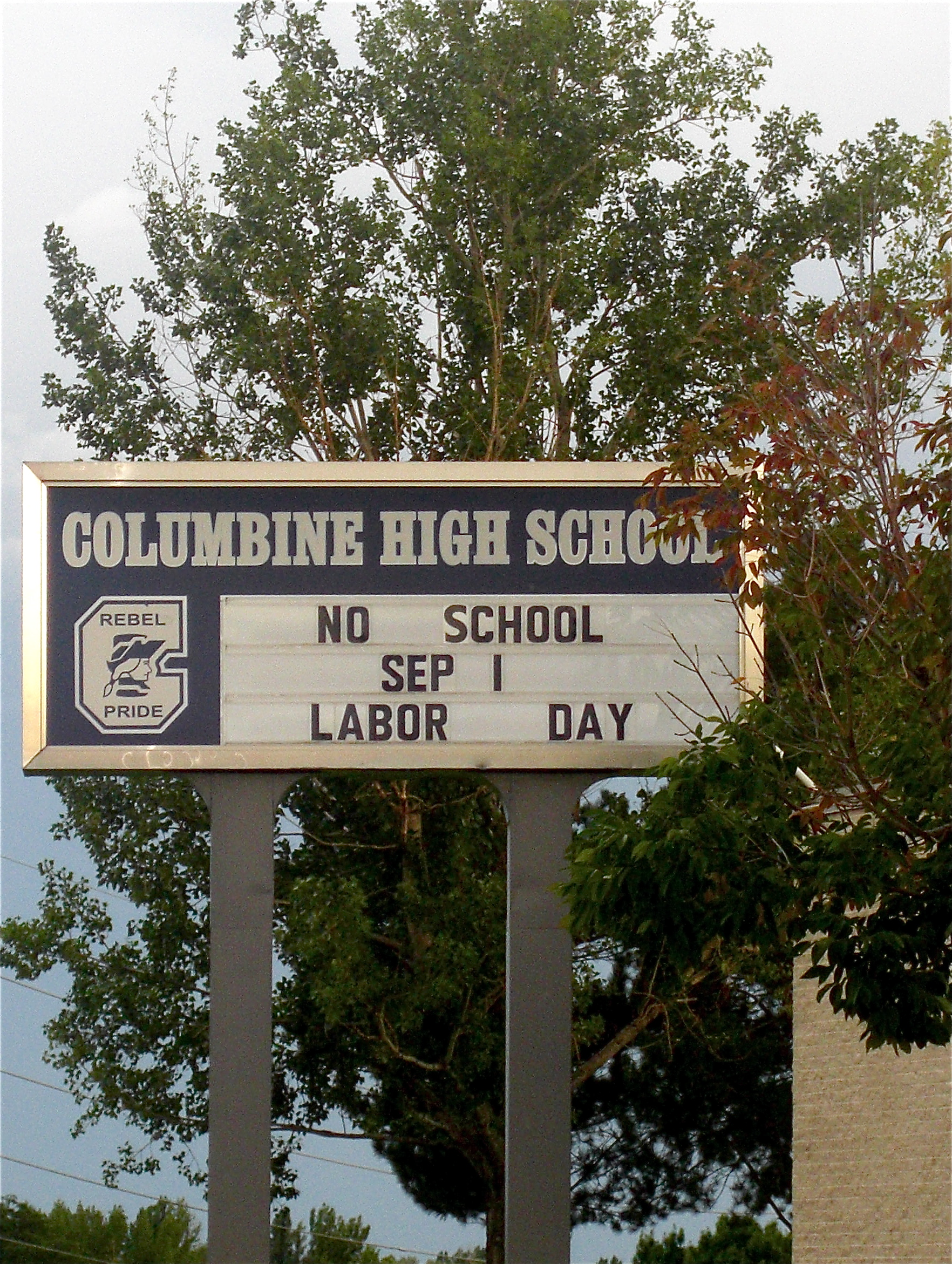
Columbine High School in 2008

No Easy Answers is divided into two sections of eleven and twelve chapters respectively. The first section, "Columbine", revolves around the background to the shooting. The second, "Aftermath", focuses on the event itself and the following investigation. Within chapters, the book switches between Brown's first-person narrative and Merritt's factual reporting; the latter sequences are in italics.

The book begins with the basics of the shooting, then the media response, which Brown posits presented it as "the work of two sick, deranged kids who represent nothing more than the work of the devil, or of violent video games, or just aberrations in an otherwise perfectly civilized high school". He criticises responses to Columbine based around media violence or gun control, arguing that the former represents an existing demand for such works rather than producing one, and notes that Harris and Klebold were already unable to legally purchase weapons in Colorado. Brown then attacks coverage that focused on the shooters' parents, segueing into his family's relationship with the Klebolds.

Brown recounts his experiences growing up with Dylan Klebold. The two met in the first grade and became close friends through elementary school; though they eventually ended up at different schools, their families remained close. Brown draws particular attention to Klebold's mother's antipathy to violence; she prohibited her son from playing with toy guns, and was skeptical about letting him play violent video games. In middle school, Brown and Klebold drifted apart due to the structure of their school placing them in different classes. Both reportedly faced significant bullying, which Brown retells his first-hand experience of. He contrasts their reactions to bullying; though Brown rebelled openly against his parents and classmates, Klebold reportedly bottled up his emotions.

Brown met Harris, whom Klebold had befriended in middle school, after the three of them started high school at Columbine. He discusses the social environment at the school, which he felt "worshipped the athlete" and created a strict hierarchy amongst students. Throughout No Easy Answers, Brown presents a narrative of extreme social hostility towards those seen as unpopular or nonconformists. He proffers examples such as students openly beating up others in the locker room; racial and ethnic hostility, such as repeated Holocaust jokes against a Jewish student; and a practice where seniors poured oil on the floor and pushed freshmen on it, which was prohibited after a girl broke her arm. In 1998, following attacks like the Thurston High School shooting, students at Columbine reportedly joked that their school would be "next" for a mass shooting due to the prevalence of bullying.

In their junior year, Harris and Brown's friendship abruptly ended after Brown stopped driving Harris to school. Harris made death threats against Brown on his personal website, which discussed his homicidal ideations and attempts at building pipe bombs. Brown showed the website to his parents, who made a police report. While a search warrant was drafted for Harris' house, it was never submitted to a judge. Brown refers to this throughout the book, arguing that the shooting could have been prevented if the police had acted earlier. The two ultimately repaired their friendship in senior year, by which point Harris and Klebold had been planning the massacre for several months. Brown contrasts this long-term planning with the common focus on short-term warning signs.

In the second part of the book, Brown recounts his experiences with the media and the police investigating the shootings. When talking to the media in the aftermath of the shooting, Brown focused on bullying and the degree to which he considered the school itself "responsible for creating Eric [Harris] and Dylan [Klebold]". He criticises commentators who downplayed the intensity of the school's environment and attempted to present the shootings as an outlier. Brown devotes a chapter to Rachel Scott, another friend of his and the first student killed at Columbine. He describes the school's religious environment as hostile to non-Christians, including to his own Taoist leanings, but distinguishes Scott as "def[ying] every expectation [he] ever had of a Christian". Brown castigates attempts to view Columbine through an ideological lens, such as Christian coverage of the deaths of Scott and Cassie Bernall, or accusations of racism in the shooting of Isaiah Shoels, the one black victim.

I saw my best friend from grade school become a mass murderer. I saw my report to the police get sweeped right under the rug. I was asked by my own school never to come back. I was called a killer on the street. I saw the families of murdered children lied to for three years, then saw our lawmakers tell them there was no reason to investigate it.

I saw all of this, and I haven't given up.

— Brooks Brown, No Easy Answers

No Easy Answers admonishes John Stone, the sheriff of Jefferson County at the time of the shootings. Stone presented Brown as a suspect, arguing that Harris and Klebold must have had help setting up bombs at the school; Brown felt this was an attempt to discredit his statements to the media, including his claims to have filed a police report against Harris. He draws attention to the disruption Stone's claims had on his life, including suspicion from people who already felt his friendship with Harris and Klebold implicated him. By May, Stone had stepped back from publicity amidst criticism about what Merritt calls his "sometimes ill-considered" statements. Three years after the shooting, evidence emerged that the Brown family's police report had been used as grounds to obtain a search warrant of the Harris family's home following the shooting. Though this exonerated Brown, it also revealed the report had been ignored during Harris's lifetime.

At the close of No Easy Answers, Brown overviews his life following the shootings and the efforts he had taken to understand them. The book closes on Brown attending the graduation ceremony for the Columbine class of 2002, the final cohort of students to have attended in 1999. He describes the path his life had taken to that point, along with the continued impact of Columbine on the local community. Though Brown criticises the community's and authorities' handling of the situation, he remains optimistic about the potential to move forward.

== Themes ==
No Easy Answers presents bullying as the proximate cause of the Columbine shooting. Brown criticises frameworks where the attack was spurred by cultural factors such as violent video games or media, as well as ideological interpretations such as the presentation of victims like Rachel Scott and Cassie Bernall as Christian martyrs. The version of Columbine High School depicted in No Easy Answers was described by two reviewers as "nothing short of horrific", with severe and persistent bullying that authorities overlooked or participated in. Brown contrasts this with some statements by other students and teachers in the shooting's aftermath, who—from his point of view—downplayed bullying and depicted Columbine as a healthy social environment.

Analysts of the book have compared Brown's statements with those by other students that admitted to and defended bullying. Evan Todd, a football player at Columbine who was wounded in the shooting, made a statement to Time Magazine that the school was a "clean, good place except for these rejects", who were "a bunch of homos, grabbing each other's private parts" and deserved bullying as subjects of "disgust". Todd presented bullying at Columbine as a positive, arguing that students who were socially nonconformist or perceived as gay deserved mistreatment. Anne Mahler, a Ph.D. candidate at University College Cork, viewed Todd's statements as supporting Brown's thesis.

A large share of the book revolves around Brown's experiences with sheriff Stone, who attempted to implicate Brown as an accomplice to the shooting. Although the sheriff's office was aware Brown had made a report against Harris in 1998, and had used that report to draft a search warrant for Harris's house, they claimed otherwise in public and attempted to discredit the legitimacy of Brown's statements. Terrance L. Peterson and John H. Hoover, respectively professors of educational psychology and special education at St. Cloud State University, argued in a review that the investigation "complicated [Brown's] ability to manage his anguish". They presented this focus as an attempt by Brown to transfer his feelings about the shooting from Klebold to Stone. Peterson and Hoover also posited that a generation gap complicated the investigation of Brown's report, with authorities failing to recognize the seriousness of Harris's online threats.

As implied by the book's title, it ultimately does not ascribe a clear narrative to the shootings. The book is primarily reflective rather than focused on factual reporting; it focuses on Brown's and Klebold's lives, with Harris portrayed as a more mysterious figure. Peterson and Hoover describe No Easy Answers as "meaning-making", conceptualizing it as essentially part of a public grieving process rather than as an attempt to conclusively explain Columbine.

== Impact and analysis ==
Reviews of No Easy Answers upon its release called attention to its content and style; a staff writer for Publishers Weekly described Brown's conversational prose as being "as if he were being questioned by a talk show host". In a review for Booklist, John Green criticised the work's "fiber-hip slang and occasionally awkward phrasing" but praised its "harrowing story", a focus of many reviews. Multiple critics referred to the title of No Easy Answers as an accurate summation of the book's contents, with Peterson and Hoover in particular referring to the book as more of a process of grieving and "meaning-making" than an attempt to conclusively explain the Columbine shooting. The book was recommended by Teen Newsbreak, a youth offshoot of the nationally popular Parade magazine.

Brown's focus on the prominence of bullying at Columbine was the subject of attention. The crime journalist Alan Prendergast, writing for Denver-based publication Westword, stated No Easy Answers "paints a grimmer picture" of the school's social environment than its teachers and authorities would admit to; Peterson and Hoover called the book's description of the school "nothing short of horrific". While reviewers made note of the prominence of bullying in No Easy Answers, several argued that it was insufficient as a full explanation for why school shootings occurred. Violence prevention researcher Paul M. Kingery argued in Youth Today that Brown's narrative failed to address the role of politics in mass violence, believing that issues such as inaccurate monitoring of school violence and a lack of recognition of students' rights to due process played underrecognized roles. Peterson, who had worked with survivors of the 2003 Rocori High School shooting, felt the idea that bullying was the sole element of either Columbine or Rocori was an oversimplification of complex factors.

No Easy Answers was one of the first books to analyze Columbine, later the subject of thousands of works. As a subject of significant early post-Columbine attention, it is believed to have influenced later works on the topic. It was published when Brown was 22 years old. A writer at the Associated Press described him at that time as "struggling", having chosen not to attend university and experiencing difficulty holding down a stable job. Following the book's publication, Brown began speaking publicly about the Columbine shooting, including at conferences; he reportedly considered writing a second book. In the mid-2000s, Brown stepped back from talking about Columbine. He stated in a Salon.com interview in 2004 that he had "come to terms" with Harris and Klebold's actions and wished to focus on other elements of his life, such as his role as a webmaster for a youth-focused internet forum. Brown went on to work in the film and game industry as a visual effects artist.

Since the release of No Easy Answers, many authors less directly linked to the Columbine shooting have written analyses of it. Peterson and Hoover, in their contemporary review, stated that "more detailed and certainly more detached" works on the event were necessary to come to a fuller understanding of why and how it happened. The role No Easy Answers plays amongst works analysing Columbine is socially and subculturally dependent. Members of online communities for people with personal or sociological interests in the shooting, often referred to colloquially as "Columbiners", frequently deem No Easy Answers a superior explanation of the shooting to that offered by works such as Columbine by Dave Cullen. The subculture's framework contrasts No Easy Answers with that of works published later or by writers with less personal connection to Columbine, which are believed to be less factually accurate or to "demonize" the shooters. Author Jeff Kass who has also published a book on the attack believes that bullying was not the cause. Frank DeAngelis wrote his version of the massacre in his 2019 book They Call Me Mr. De denying that bullying was a cause for Harris and Klebold to commit the shootings. Various forensic psychologists, psychiatrists and criminologists also dispute the theory of "revenge for bullying" as the motivation.
