= They Call Me Mr. De =

2019 book by Frank DeAngelis

- Book cover
- Author: Frank DeAngelis
- Publisher: David Burgess Consulting
- Publication date: March 31, 2019
- Pages: 268
- ISBN: 978-1-94959-506-2
- Dewey Decimal: 373.78882

They Call Me Mr. De: The Story of Columbine's Heart, Resilience, and Recovery is a 2019 non-fiction book by Frank DeAngelis about the Columbine High School massacre. DeAngelis was the school principal at Columbine High School and became the subject of praise and criticism alike. He chronicles the events of that day and how much impact they had on his life and family, recounting his experiences with survivor guilt and a heart condition as a consequence of the stress. DeAngelis also addresses the issue of bullying at Columbine High, assuring that it was not a major problem at the school and that he had not been aware of such incidents involving the shooters.

== Background ==
The Columbine High School massacre was a school shooting and attempted bombing committed by two Columbine students, Eric Harris and Dylan Klebold, on April 20, 1999. After smuggling a number of improvised explosives onto campus, most of which failed to operate, Harris and Klebold shot and killed twelve students and one teacher before turning the guns on themselves. At the time, it was the deadliest school shooting in American history. The Columbine shooting had significant effects on education, policy, copycat crime, and media and cultural portrayals of school violence. Columbine affected decision-making around school security, active shooter response protocols, anti-bullying policy, and religion in schools.

DeAngelis had been the school principal at Columbine High since 1996 and barely knew Harris and Klebold, describing them as good students who liked computers and technology, adding that they did not call the school administration's attention aside from producing violent content in their school essays and their legal troubles in January 1998 as a result of a burglary. Before the Columbine shootings, DeAngelis was a baseball coach and assistant football coach who was affectionately known by children as "Mr. De."

== Contents ==
DeAngelis reiterates through the chapters of the book that he recites the names of the 13 victims every morning. (Note: When DeAngelis wrote his book, the 14th victim – Anne Marie Hochhalter – was alive.) He tells about his beginnings in teaching, his career as a baseball and football coach, and relates experiences with the victims, both fatal and wounded. DeAngelis makes an emphasis in his relationship with Dave Sanders, the only teacher who was killed in the massacre and who DeAngelis met the afternoon of April 19, 1999. He also chronicles the relationship with his wife and how the shootings affected their bond and his health, developing a heart condition due to post-traumatic stress disorder.

Telling his experience that morning, DeAngelis sets the start point at a meeting with staff members in a conference room in the north wing of the building. DeAngelis says that when he exited the room and walked the hallway, his secretary came running to him and said that there were gunshots downstairs. Fuelled by anxiety and panic, DeAngelis tells how he ran through the school's hallways and came into contact with one of the gunmen, who opened fire in his direction before being distracted by Dave Sanders. DeAngelis narrates the sense of responsibility when he led a group of female students and locked them in a cabinet inside the school's gym, urging them to remain quiet. He subsequently made it out of the building and helped police and SWAT teams draw diagrams and maps of the school and its hallways.

DeAngelis continues his story by describing the horror that he felt as details leaked from authorities and Sheriff John Stone about the casualties inside the school. Due to their friendship, DeAngelis says that he was deeply disturbed by the confirmation of Sanders's death. Subsequent chapters explore the issues of bullying at Columbine High and the repercussions of the massacre in American society, the copycat effect of Columbine, as well as the media's reaction and his struggle with survivor guilt. Parts of these chapters address the known grievances that marginalized students felt towards him for allegedly protecting the so-called jocks or enabling their attitudes. One of these examples is Brooks Brown, who accused DeAngelis of turning a blind eye to the issue of bullying at Columbine High in his 2002 book No Easy Answers.

According to DeAngelis, there were no known major issues of bullying or harassment from jocks against this type of student, saying instead that the opposite happened, with the jocks telling him that there were rumors and lies about them and adding that Harris and Klebold were the ones harassing other, more vulnerable students. DeAngelis places a particular emphasis on Eric Harris and his behaviors dating long before the shootings, including his ability to deceive authorities, mental health professionals, and teachers, characterizing Harris as a textbook psychopath.

The final part of the book narrates the process of healing and his role at Columbine High and in the community of Littleton, Colorado, while it dealt with the trauma in the aftermath of the massacre. These entries include DeAngelis's health problems and hospitalizations due to his heart disease, as well as the emotional pain that affected the relationship with his first wife, which ended in the divorce of the couple. The divorce brought about for DeAngelis a strained relationship with his daughter that he was later able to repair. He expands on his relationship with Diane Meyer, whom DeAngelis knew from his time as a student at Iver C. Ranum High School in the 1970s. They married in 2013. The last chapters narrate DeAngelis's work as a motivational speaker and how he helped communities affected by school shootings to begin the healing process. These talks made him travel across the United States and even to Canada in the aftermath of La Loche shootings in Saskatchewan.

The book ends with DeAngelis's retirement as principal of Columbine High in 2014 and how he has shaped the experience in his life. DeAngelis had planned to retire in 2002, when the youngest students during the massacre would graduate, ultimately deciding to stay upon insistence by members of the community.

== Reception ==
Writing for the British newspaper The Guardian, Ed Pilkington highlighted the book's "poignant details" about the victims and their stories, while asking why DeAngelis has never campaigned for tighter gun control, instead choosing to support changes like the rapid response to an active shooter to reduce the number of casualties. Pilkington, who wrote the opinion in April 2019, noted the case of Sol Pais, a Florida teenager who was so infatuated with Columbine that she travelled to Colorado in the days before the 20th anniversary of the massacre and threatened schools in the Jefferson County area.

The subject of his mental health activism was also noted by Pilkington, who said that DeAngelis sought psychological help and urged youths to do the same in times where seeking mental health attention was considered for "wimps." Pilkington further mentioned the myth around bullying and the shooters, saying that DeAngelis's position that neither Harris nor Klebold was harassed is shared by author Dave Cullen who wrote Columbine in 2009, describing Harris as a psychopath and Klebold as deeply depressed. DeAngelis has supported the theory of Harris's psychopathy, describing both Harris and Klebold as "deeply troubled" in a December 1999 interview with Time.

Positive reviews or comments on the book's focus on resilience and healing were made in several outlets, including Boston-based radio station WBUR-FM, which interviewed DeAngelis in April 2019, and Education Week, which also interviewed him about his motivational speaking engagements, the personal impact of Columbine, and his exercise of resilience and remembrance of the victims. Dakin Andone of CNN wrote for the 20th anniversary that DeAngelis is still deeply affected by the massacre at Columbine High, making a mention of his commitment to other communities going through similar experiences, including counseling to the families of the Parkland High School shooting, the Santa Fe High School shooting, and the 2018 Marshall County High School shooting in Benton, Kentucky.
