= John Stone (sheriff) =

American sheriff (1949–2022)

- Portrait of John P. Stone

Sheriff of Jefferson County, Colorado
- In office January 1999 – January 2003
- Preceded by: Ronald Beckham
- Succeeded by: Russ Cook

Personal details
- Born: John P. Stone; July 7, 1949 Battle Creek, Michigan, U.S.
- Died: November 6, 2022 (aged 73) Eden Prairie, Minnesota, U.S.
- Party: Republican
- Spouse: Susan Gates (m. 2010)
- Occupation: Politician, law enforcement
- Known for: Sheriff of Jefferson County, Colorado, during the Columbine High School massacre

John P. Stone (July 7, 1949 – November 6, 2022) was an American politician and police officer who served as sheriff of Jefferson County, Colorado, between 1999 and 2003. He was the center of national and international attention soon after taking office when two students of Columbine High School perpetrated the Columbine High School massacre on April 20, 1999.

Stone's handling of the Columbine crisis and police response drew strong criticism, mainly because officers did not enter the building to confront the shooters. Stone defended his officers' actions by saying that his officers simply followed their training. After Columbine, changes were implemented in the active shooter training for officers in the United States and the world.

== Early life and career ==
John Stone was born in Battle Creek, Michigan, to Elvon and Norma Stone. In 1967, upon graduating from high school, he moved to Palo Alto, California, and began a career in law enforcement as a police officer for the Palo Alto Police Department, serving as a campus officer at Foothill College. In 1971, Stone earned a degree in criminal justice from the San Jose State University, and he joined the U.S. Army that same year, serving in the Army National Guard. After his discharge, Stone joined the California National Guard and was listed as active until October 1976, when he received an honorable discharge. He also earned a master's degree in public administration from the University of Colorado Denver.

In 1974, Stone moved to Lakewood, Colorado, and began working for the Lakewood Police Department, remaining there for 13 years. He was elected as a commissioner for Jefferson County in 1987, serving as District 3 Commissioner for three consecutive four-year terms as a Republican. Between 1982 and 1987, Stone also served as president of the Bancroft Fire Protection District. His political positions included supporting improvements in transportation, from building new bridges and roads, to helping public libraries and expanding open spaces. He subsequently served from 1987 to 1998 in Jefferson County's Board of Commissions.

In November 1998, Stone ran for sheriff of Jefferson County as a Republican against independent candidate Ted Mink. Mink was endorsed by former sheriff Ron Beck (a Republican), who said that Mink had more experience than Stone in law enforcement. During the campaign, Stone expressed that he felt "betrayed" by Beck's endorsement of Mink. He ultimately won the election and assumed office in January 1999.

== Columbine High School massacre ==
On April 20, 1999, two senior students from Columbine High School—Eric Harris and Dylan Klebold, aged 18 and 17, respectively—carried out one of the most infamous school shootings in American history, killing 13 students and one teacher (Note: The last victim, Anne Marie Hochhalter, died on February 16, 2025, as consequences of the injuries she sustained in the shooting at Columbine.) before killing themselves. The attack, which was also an attempted bombing, left lasting consequences in American society, from numerous copycat attacks to idolization of Harris and Klebold by troubled youths, and changes in police response to active shooter situations, with SWAT teams nationwide implementing immediate action rapid deployment.

Harris and Klebold began their rampage at 11:19 a.m. (MDT) and committed suicide inside the school's library at 12:08 p.m. with no police officer entering the school until one hour later, when SWAT members began combing the building at 1:09 p.m. The school was not secured until five hours later, with Stone giving a preliminary number of 25 dead and 50 wounded during a press conference at 4:00 p.m. When asked about a motive, Stone only said "madness" and referred to the attack as a "suicide mission". Following the release of the confirmed number of casualties, Stone came under heavy criticism for overestimating them during that first press conference. He subsequently made other inaccurate or controversial comments, including that Harris and Klebold had "fully automatic" weapons and at least one accomplice. In the theory that there had been an accomplice in the shootings, Stone publicly suggested that police suspected that Brooks Brown, a classmate and former friend of Harris and Klebold, was involved in the massacre.

Stone based the claim against Brown on Harris telling him "to go home" minutes before the shootings began. On May 4, 1999, Stone said during an interview with Dan Abrams on NBC that Brown was "a possible suspect", though he did not provide any evidence. The accusation was met with a furious response from Randy and Judy Brown, the boy's parents, with Randy strongly criticizing Stone and saying that the sheriff was looking for a "scapegoat". Randy also asserted that the Federal Bureau of Investigation had told him that Brooks was not considered a suspect, and he was later cleared of any suspicion.

Stone faced a strong backlash in the aftermath of the shootings, including lawsuits and accusations that his office ignored warning signs about Eric Harris. Among the red flags that Harris had raised in the months leading up to the massacre was a police report by the Browns, who told a Jefferson County police detective that Harris was building homemade pipebombs and that he had threatened to kill their son; Stone's office confirmed that they received multiple reports about Harris, but the district attorney and the Browns said they were never informed about the proceedings or progress in the investigation. Colorado Attorney General Ken Salazar confirmed this in Columbine's Report. The Browns gathered signatures to recall Stone in 2000 and remove him from office after he implied their son was involved in the massacre, and because of loss of trust and mismanagement issues; the attempt ultimately failed.

As part of the investigation, then-Governor Bill Owens created a committee to issue a final report on Columbine. Stone was summoned in every one of the 15 public hearings, but he refused to attend any of them, with a spokesman for his office saying that Stone would not comment on the document until he read it, adding that his silence and refusal to give press conferences were caused by the civil lawsuits brought against the Jefferson County Sheriff Department. The panel found Stone responsible for the lack of action. The refusal by Stone's office to release information about Harris and Klebold, as well as how their parents obtained legal immunity to testify, brought further criticism on Stone.

== Aftermath ==
Stone's career began to fall apart soon after, as civil lawsuits and crossed accusations ensued. In December 1999, the Denver-based newspaper Westword included Stone in the "Hall of Shame 1999", highlighting the contradiction between Stone expressing the public's "right to know" when justifying his initial press conference declaration of 25 students and teachers being found dead, and findings by a Time journalist that proved that Stone had concealed the existence of the Basement Tapes made by Harris and Klebold months before the shootings.

In April 2002, Stone announced that he would not seek another term in that year's election. Families of the victims, including Brian Rohrbough, whose son was killed at Columbine, welcomed his decision not to run. Out of seven lawsuits against Stone and his office, Judge Lewis Babcock of the District Court for the District of Colorado only allowed the family of slain teacher Dave Sanders to proceed, dismissing the other six cases in November 2001. The Sanders lawsuit was settled between his daughter Angela and Jefferson County in August 2002 on $1.5 million; however, Stone's office did not admit any responsibility in Sanders' death during the settlement hearing.

Stone defended his department's actions during the shootings, writing a letter to 60 Minutes, where he described the Columbine attack as a "unique set of circumstances, the magnitude of which no one had dealt with before". While he refused to be interviewed on camera, Stone told 60 Minutes that his officers "responded quickly, returned fire, deployed appropriately and safely extracted hundreds of trapped and terrified students and teachers". Larry Glick, an expert on SWAT training and tactics, defended Stone, saying that Jefferson County police believed that there were six to eight gunmen inside the school, and that by waiting for more prepared personnel to arrive, the officers were following department protocol.

After the 2002 election, Stone was succeeded by Russ Cook, another Republican who held office for only six months. Shortly after Stone's departure, Attorney General Salazar proposed to disband the Columbine Task Force that was still active investigating the sheriff office's failures on the day of the massacre. Salazar later retracted his decision after facing backlash from families and relatives of the victims.

In 2003, Stone began a career in private security, working at the Denver International Airport (DIA), where he was first employed by Northwest Airlines. He was later transferred by Northwest to the Minneapolis–Saint Paul International Airport, where he continued to work in security jobs until retiring from Delta Air Lines.

== Personal life and death ==
Stone had lost his 15-year-old son Brian to suicide some years before Columbine. In 2006, he met Susan Gates, a Northwest Airlines flight attendant who was training at DIA. They became engaged and married in December 2010 in Nevada. Stone died in hospice care in Eden Prairie, Minnesota, on November 6, 2022, at the age of 73. He was survived by his wife Susan, a daughter, a stepdaughter, and two grandsons, among other relatives.

Then-sheriff of Jefferson County Jeff Shrader, who worked under Stone, expressed his condolences to Stone's family and recalled him as a "kind and caring man" who was committed to his family. Other reactions were mixed, with Randy Brown expressing sadness and saying that while he held "no enmity, no anger" toward him, he considered Stone as "simply not qualified" for a tragedy like Columbine.
