= Brooks Brown (disambiguation) =

Brooks Brown is an American saxophonist and former member of the Cherry Poppin' Daddies.

Brooks Brown may also refer to:

- Brooks Brown (author), American author of No Easy Answers: the Truth Behind Death at Columbine and survivor of the Columbine High School massacre
- Brooks Brown (baseball) (born 1985), American baseball pitcher for the Colorado Rockies
