= Columbine (book) =

2009 non-fiction book written by Dave Cullen

- Book cover
- Author: Dave Cullen
- Cover artist: Henry Sene Yee
- Language: English
- Subject: Columbine High School massacre
- Publisher: Twelve (Hachette Book Group)
- Publication date: April 6, 2009
- Publication place: United States
- Media type: Hardback, paperback, audiobook, Kindle, Nook, large-print
- Pages: 432
- ISBN: 978-0-446-54693-5
- OCLC: 236082459
- Dewey Decimal: 373.788/8 22
- LC Class: LB3013.33.C6 C84 2009

Columbine is a non-fiction book written by Dave Cullen and published by Twelve (Hachette Book Group) on April 6, 2009. It is an examination of the Columbine High School massacre, on April 20, 1999, and the perpetrators Eric Harris and Dylan Klebold. The book covers two major storylines: the killers' lives leading up to the attack, and the survivors' struggles with the aftermath over the following decade. Chapters alternate between the two stories. Graphic depictions of parts of the attack are included, in addition to the actual names of friends and family (the only exception being the pseudonym "Harriet", which is used for a female Columbine student referred to in Klebold's journal entries, with whom he was obsessively in love).

Cullen says he spent ten years researching and writing the book. He previously contributed to The New York Times, The Washington Post, The Times of London, and The Guardian. He is best known for his work for Slate and Salon.com. His Slate story "The Depressive and the Psychopath" five years earlier, offered the first diagnosis of the killers by the team of psychologists and psychiatrists brought on the case by the FBI. Publication was timed to coincide with the tenth anniversary of the massacre, which occurred on April 20, 1999. The book spent eight weeks on The New York Times bestseller list in the spring of 2009, peaking at #3.

The book gained considerable media attention for addressing many of the so-called Columbine myths that were widely perpetuated by the news media and believed by the general public. According to the book, the massacre had nothing to do with school bullying, jocks, the Gothic subculture, Marilyn Manson, or the Trench Coat Mafia. Cullen also writes that the attack was intended primarily as a bombing rather than a school shooting, and that Harris and Klebold aimed to perpetrate the deadliest terrorist attack in American history. The book garnered glowing reviews from Time, Newsweek, People, The New York Observer and Entertainment Weekly. One of the few dissenting views came from Janet Maslin, who wrote in The New York Times, "What good can a new book on Columbine do? Mr. Cullen's Salon coverage had already refuted some of the worst misconceptions about the story by the fall of 1999... Emerging details mostly corroborate what was already known."

Columbine won a bevy of awards and honors, including the Edgar Allan Poe Award, Barnes & Noble's Discover Award, and the Goodreads Choice Award. It was a finalist for the LA Times Book Prize, the Audie Award, and the MPIBA Regional Book Award. Additionally, Columbine was named on two dozen Best of 2009 lists, including The New York Times, Los Angeles Times, Publishers Weekly, iTunes and the American Library Association. It was declared Top Education Book of 2009, and one of the best of the decade by the American School Board Journal.

== Development ==
In a 2015 Vanity Fair essay, the author described the powerful impact his mentor Lucia Berlin had on the creation of the book and on his ability to vividly portray such characters as Klebold and teacher Dave Sanders, describing Berlin as “the guiding force in my work, and my life” even long after her death.

== Synopsis ==
Columbine has two main storylines, told in alternating chapters: the 'before' story of the killers' evolution toward murder, and the 'after' story of the survivors. There are shorter 'during' accounts, describing the attack itself, dispersed throughout the book. Formally composed of 53 chapters divided into five parts, the book also includes a timeline, 26 pages of detailed endnotes, and a fifteen-page bibliography organized into topics.

The 'before' story focuses primarily on the killers' high school years preceding the massacre. According to the experts cited in the book, using retrospective diagnoses based on their writings and accounts of those close to them, Eric Harris was a textbook psychopath, and Dylan Klebold was an angry depressive.

The 'after' story is composed of eight major sub-stories, focused on individuals who played a key role in the aftermath of the attack, including Columbine Principal Frank DeAngelis, alleged Christian martyr Cassie Bernall (a myth that came from a student mixing up Cassie and Valeen Schnurr in his account of the events that occurred in the library), "the boy in the window" (Patrick Ireland), FBI Supervisory Special Agent Dwayne Fuselier, and the families of victim Daniel Rohrbough and teacher Dave Sanders, who died saving students from the gunmen. The Evangelical Christian community's feverish response to the alleged "martyrdom" issue is also chronicled.

Columbine opens at a school assembly hosted by Principal DeAngelis just before Prom weekend, four days before the massacre. Scenes from the massacre are graphically depicted in the early chapters, and later through flashbacks.

== Reception ==
Published by Twelve (Hachette Book Group) on April 6, 2009, Columbine debuted at number seven on the bestseller list for The New York Times in the United States. It peaked at number three, and spent eight weeks on the list.

The book was very well received by critics, and by news media, which focused heavily on the dispelling of numerous Columbine myths, and the extensive exploration into the possible motives and the minds of the two killers. In The New York Observer, Stephen Amidon described Columbine as a "gripping study... To his credit, Mr. Cullen does not simply tear down Columbine's legends. He also convincingly explains what really sparked the murderous rage... disquieting... beautifully written."

Several critics compared the book to In Cold Blood, including former Publishers Weekly Editor-In-Chief Sara Nelson, who reviewed it for The Daily Beast and called it "a riveting read, on a par with the greatest crime analysis from In Cold Blood or The Stranger Beside Me." A debate sprang up on the issue, with some critics concurring, and others arguing that Cullen's artistry fell short of Truman Capote's.

Jennifer Senior, in The New York Times Book Review, resisted the Capote comparison, but offered high praise. She observed that: "Had Dave Cullen capitulated to cliché while writing ‘Columbine’, he would have started his tale 48 hours before Eric Harris and Dylan Klebold's notorious killing spree, stopped the frame just before they fired their guns, and then spooled back to the very beginning, with the promise of trying to explain how the two boys got to this twisted pass. But he doesn't. As Cullen eventually writes, ‘there had been no trigger’ — at least none that would be satisfying to horrified outsiders, grieving parents or anyone in between. Eric Harris was a psychopath, simple as that. Dylan Klebold was a suicidally depressed kid who yoked his fate to a sadist. Instead, what intrigues the author are perceptions and misperceptions: how difficult a shooting spree is to untangle; how readily mass tragedies lend themselves to misinformation and mythologizing; how psychopaths can excel at the big con... Yet what's amazing is how much of Cullen's book still comes as a surprise. I expected a story about misfits exacting vengeance, because that was my memory of the media consensus — Columbine, right, wasn't there something going on there between goths and jocks? In fact, Harris and Klebold were killing completely at random that day. Their victims weren't the intended targets at all; the entire school was."

Janet Maslin published one of the book's few negative reviews. In the daily issue of The New York Times, Maslin wrote: "And now that books as commercially ambitious as Columbine are marketed like movies, an online video advertisement for the book touts its '10 years in the making', calling it 'the definitive story of an American tragedy'. For the same YouTube trailer, Cullen allowed himself to be filmed sitting at his desk amid potted houseplants, scrolling solemnly through a computer-screen copy of one of the killers' hate-filled journals."

Maslin wrote, "But Mr. Cullen has not written this book solely to dissect the events of Columbine. He also invites his readers to relive them. So he replays the planning and execution of the killings for maximum dramatic impact, trying to get right inside the killers' heads."

Newsweek essay by Ramin Satoodeh stated: "In the decade since Columbine, there have been countless efforts to make sense of that day: memoirs, books, movies, even a play opening in Los Angeles in April. The definitive account, however, will likely be Dave Cullen's Columbine, a nonfiction book that has the pacing of an action movie and the complexity of a Shakespearean drama... Cullen has a gift, if that's the right word, for excruciating detail. At times the language is so vivid you can almost smell the gunpowder and the fear... The Columbine killers were a strange and deeply disturbed pair, right out of a Truman Capote book. We've heard plenty of the details about Klebold and Harris—their fixation with the Nazis, their lust for violence, the homemade tapes in which they laid out their grand scheme for us to watch later—but Cullen, despite all odds, manages to humanize them... Cullen also debunks some of the biggest fallacies."

== Awards ==
Columbine has won the following awards.

- Edgar Award: Best Fact Crime Book 2009
- Barnes and Noble Discover Award: Best Nonfiction Book 2009
- Goodreads Choice Award: Best Nonfiction Book 2009
- American School Board Association: Best Education Book of 2009
- The Truth About The Fact Award

Columbine was a finalist for the following awards.

- The Los Angeles Times Book Prize
- The American Library Association Alex Award
- The Audie Award
- Abraham Lincoln High School Book Award (Winner to be announced in spring 2012.)
- The Mountains and Plains Independent Booksellers Association Award

Columbine was named on many Best of 2009 lists, including these.

- New York Times Book Review: 100 Notable Books of 2009
- Los Angeles Times: 25 Favorite Nonfiction Books of 2009
- LA Times Editor David Ulin's Top Six Nonfiction
- Entertainment Weekly: Best Books of 2009: #4 in Nonfiction
- American School Board Journal: #1 Education Book for 2009
- Publishers Weekly Best 100 Books for 2009
- iTunes: #1 Best Nonfiction Audiobook of 2009
- Salon.com: 5 Best Nonfiction Books of 2009
- GoodReads Choice Awards: Winner Best Nonfiction of 2009
- Chicago Tribune: Favorite Nonfiction Books of 2009
- Miami Herald: 12 Reviewers' Choices for Most Intriguing Books of 2009
- Borders: 10 Best of 2009: Nonfiction
- Amazon Editors' Picks: 5 Best Current Events Books of 2009
- Amazon Top 100 Customer Favorites of 2009
- Bookmarks: Best Books of 2009
- Mother Jones: Top Books of 2009
- Washington Post Express: 2009 Express Staff Picks
- New Haven Register: 10 recommended nonfiction for 2009
- New London Connecticut's The Day: Best of '09
- New West: Best Books in the West 2009

== Paperback edition: New disclosures from the killers' parents ==
The Columbine paperback edition (released in 2010) reveals details of four secret meetings involving all four parents of the killers. This unforeseen development provided the first real public insight into the mindsets of Wayne and Kathy Harris. The awkward encounters play out in the new "Afterword" added to the paperback. Further descriptions of the meetings with Wayne and Kathy Harris appear in The Daily Beast feature, "The Last Columbine Mystery," also by Dave Cullen, published at the time of the paperback release.

The Afterword also includes updates about two bereaved parents and one wounded survivor of the Columbine shootings, and their starkly different perspectives on "forgiveness". The three individuals in question are Linda Mauser (mother of victim Daniel Mauser), Bob Curnow (father of victim Steven Curnow) and Valeen Schnurr (a survivor), respectively.

The expanded paperback edition of 2010 also adds scans from the killers' numerous journals, a diagram of the attack, and book club questions.

== Use in schools ==
Columbine has been widely adopted as a textbook in high school English and Social Studies classes, as well as college journalism classes. The author created a free Columbine Teacher's Guide, as well as classroom videos and related material which have been widely downloaded from the internet. The guide includes units on teen depression, P.T.S.D. and overcoming adversity.

Several educational associations singled out the book for students and teachers. The American School Board Journal chose it as the "Top Education Book for 2009". It also called it "one of the best education books of the past 10 years." The American Library Association selected Columbine as a finalist for its "Alex Award for Young Adult Readers." In 2011, the Illinois School Library Media Association nominated Columbine for its "Abraham Lincoln Award: Illinois' High School Readers' Choice Award", which was open to student voting through February 2012.

== Film and theater adaptation ==
The book has been under development for television with Killer Films, Lifetime and NBC Universal.

The theatrical rights to the book were briefly acquired after the book's publication, by Kathleen Kennedy and Frank Marshall. The producers instead chose to adapt the book into a one-act play entitled The Library. The play was written by screenwriter Scott Z. Burns and directed by Steven Soderbergh. The original ensemble cast included Chloë Grace Moretz, Lili Taylor and Michael O'Keefe.

== Translation ==
The book has been translated into Japanese, Korean, Portuguese and Russian, with translations underway in Simplified Chinese and Polish.

== See also ==
- Columbine High School
- A Mother's Reckoning – 2016 memoir by Sue Klebold, mother of perpetrator Dylan Klebold
- No Easy Answers – 2002 memoir by Brooks Brown, a friend of Dylan Klebold and Eric Harris.
- They Call Me Mr. De – 2019 memoir by Frank DeAngelis, principal of Columbine High School from 1996 to 2014.

== Reviews ==
- Bailey, Spencer (2009-04-06). "Columbine: The Book". Esquire.
- Review at Letters on Pages
- Links to most major reviews at author's site
