= A Mother's Reckoning =

2016 memoir by Sue Klebold

A Mother's Reckoning: Living in the Aftermath of Tragedy
- First edition
- Author: Sue Klebold
- Language: English
- Genre: Memoir
- Published: 2016
- Publisher: Crown Publishers
- Publication place: United States
- Pages: 305
- ISBN: 978-1-101-90275-2 (hardcover)

A Mother's Reckoning: Living in the Aftermath of Tragedy is a 2016 memoir by Sue Klebold, the mother of Dylan Klebold. Along with Eric Harris, Dylan was one of the perpetrators of the Columbine High School massacre in 1999. The book details the childhood and teenage years of her son, and what she says are signs she missed that Dylan was suffering from clinical depression. The book also examines her grieving process in dealing with the fallout of the massacre.

In his foreword to the book, author Andrew Solomon wrote, "The ultimate message of this book is terrifying: you may not know your own children, and worse yet, your children may be unknowable to you. The stranger you fear may be your own son or daughter." Sue Klebold donated all of her profits from the book to mental health charities.

== Contents ==
The book describes Dylan Klebold as he grew into a teenager and his behaviors in the time leading up to the massacre, as well as Sue Klebold's desire to leave public attention after the massacre occurred, as she faced negative attitudes towards herself and stresses on her family. She did not believe her son willingly partook in the attack until she viewed the videotapes he made with Eric Harris. She ultimately decided to promote suicide prevention. As reviewer Rachel Shteir notes, the book "avoids details of the attack". The book also describes the various media-related controversies, including bullying, copycatting, and the effect of violence on U.S. culture. Sue Klebold often states that her son was depressive instead of psychopathic, and that unlike Eric Harris, Dylan allowed some victims to flee, and killed fewer people, as well.

== Release ==
Sue Klebold donated the revenue from the book to charities aiming to solve mental health problems.

== Reception ==
Meghan O'Rourke of The Guardian wrote that the book is "compelling as a grief memoir" and that "to read it is to be unforgettably drawn into the devastation she endured". O'Rourke stated her belief that the "most haunting" aspect of the book is its inability to answer questions about why Dylan Klebold did what he did.

Barbara Ellen of The Observer argued that it was a "brave, sad, self-castigating book" and that Sue Klebold never tried to "excuse her son's crimes". According to Ellen, the victims may not like Sue Klebold's rationalization that Dylan Klebold did not kill as many people as Eric Harris. She also noted that Sue Klebold focuses on mental health and "despite being anti-gun, she's frustratingly non-committal about US gun laws."

Susan Dominus of The New York Times wrote that "the book's ultimate purpose is to serve as a cautionary tale, not an exoneration", and in addition she argued that the book was meant for the parents of the deceased victims. According to Carlos Lozada of The Washington Post, the book shows the potential "warning signs" Sue Klebold missed as well as "an apology to the loved ones of the victims". Rachel Shteir of The Boston Globe argued that the book could have given more information on Dylan's characteristics, and she concluded that "In A Mother's Reckoning there is much more suffering than understanding. Still there is some comfort in viewing this mother's chronicle, as Solomon urges, as 'a narrative of acceptance.'"

== See also ==
- No Easy Answers, memoir by a friend of Dylan Klebold
- They Call Me Mr. De, memoir by principal Frank DeAngelis
- List of books about the Columbine High School massacre
