= Rachel Scott =

American murder victim (1981–1999)

- Scott in 1997
- Born: Rachel Joy Scott; August 5, 1981; Denver, Colorado, U.S.
- Died: April 20, 1999 (aged 17); Columbine, Colorado, U.S.
- Cause of death: Gunshot wounds (killed by Eric Harris)
- Burial place: Chapel Hill Memorial Gardens, Centennial, Colorado, U.S.
- Occupation: Student

Rachel Joy Scott (August 5, 1981 – April 20, 1999) was an American student who was the first victim of the Columbine High School massacre, in which twelve other students and one teacher were killed by Eric Harris and Dylan Klebold, who then committed suicide. During the time of the massacre, Scott was eating lunch with her friend Richard Castaldo outside the school, when Eric Harris shot them multiple times with a Hi-Point 995. Castaldo survived, but Scott died from her injuries. Her body was left outside and was not retrieved until the following morning.

Born in Colorado, Scott was a sociable girl, who often displayed concern for the well-being of others if they were in need. She converted to Christianity in March 1993 after visiting the church her aunt and uncle attended, because of her faith, she was occasionally a victim of mockery and bullying by several of her peers. Scott struggled with self-esteem issues growing up, being described as "blind to her own beauty". At an early age, she developed an interest for photography and poetry. Before enrolling in Columbine High School in the ninth grade, Scott previously attended Ken Caryl Middle School, and Dutch Creek Elementary School.

On the day after the shooting, Scott's car was turned into a makeshift memorial, with a chain-link fence around the vehicle for mourners to leave their tokens of grief. Her funeral was the most watched broadcast in CNN history at the time. Scott has been revered by groups of evangelical Christians as a Christian martyr, although the circumstances surrounding her death and martyrdom have been disputed. She posthumously was the subject and co-writer of several books, and also was the inspiration for and namesake of Rachel's Challenge, an international school outreach program and the most popular school assembly program in the United States. The aim of Rachel's Challenge is to advocate Scott's values, based on her life, her journals, and the contents of a two-page essay, penned a month before her murder, entitled My Ethics; My Codes of Life.

== Early life ==
=== Childhood ===
Rachel Joy Scott was born in Denver, Colorado, on August 5, 1981. She was the third of five children born to Darrell Scott and Beth Nimmo (née Cecrle). The family are devout Christians. Her father was previously a pastor in Lakewood, Colorado, and worked as a sales manager for a Denver-based food company; her mother was a homemaker. Rachel's parents divorced in 1988 but maintained a cordial relationship and held joint custody of the children. Beth and her children relocated to Littleton, Colorado the following year, where she later remarried in 1995.

As a child, Scott was an energetic, sociable girl, who displayed concern for the well-being of others, particularly if they were downcast or otherwise in need. She developed a passion for photography and poetry at an early age. Scott attended Dutch Creek Elementary School and Ken Caryl Middle School before she enrolled in Columbine High School in the ninth grade. At Columbine, she was an attentive, above-average student who displayed a flair for music, acting, drama, and debate. She was a member of the school's forensics and drama clubs. As acting did not initially come easily to her, she devoted extra effort to succeed.

=== Adolescence and Christian beliefs ===
When Scott was 11 in March 1993, she visited the church that her aunt and uncle attended in Shreveport, Louisiana, and chose to convert to Christianity. By April 1998, when she was at Columbine High School, five of her closest friends had distanced themselves from her because of her increasing commitment to her faith. Furthermore, she was occasionally subjected to mockery by several of her peers because of her faith. Scott described this in a letter to a relative a year prior to her death, writing: "Now that I have begun to walk my talk, they make fun of me. I don't even know what I have done. I don't even have to say anything, and they turn me away. I have no more personal friends at school. But you know what, it's all worth it."

On many occasions throughout Scott's adolescence, her family observed her in prayer both at home and at church. Her mother said that her daughter would regularly pray on her knees, with her head bowed, her hands upon her face, and that often, these particular prayer rituals brought tears to Scott's eyes. On one occasion, this included writing a prayer for one of the future perpetrators of the Columbine High School massacre.

By the age of 17, Scott was a regular attendee of three churches: Celebration Christian Fellowship; Orchard Road Christian Center; and Trinity Christian Center, where she choreographed dances at Sunday service. She was also an active member of church youth groups; at the Orchard Road Christian Center, she attended a youth group named "Breakthrough", where she displayed a passionate interest in both evangelism and discipleship. Scott wrote in her journals that her spiritual awareness developed greatly through attending this youth group, and she became known as a leading advocate within it.

== Personal life ==
Scott struggled with self-esteem issues as a teenager, and was later described by her family as "blind to her own beauty". By the age of 17, although popular among her peers, she occasionally resisted attending certain social events with friends out of fear she would succumb to the temptation of drinking alcohol. In her mid-teens, Scott had a serious relationship with a boy, but chose to end it over concerns that it might develop into a physical encounter. Throughout high school, she expressed a desire to support fellow students who were marginalized or otherwise isolated. According to her writings, she strove to "reach out to those with special needs because they are often overlooked […] to those who are new in school because they don't have any friends yet […] and to those who are picked on or put down by others."

According to friends, Scott often chose to wear clothes of a style reflecting her colorful personality, and occasionally wore eccentric hats, fedoras, or even pajamas to amuse her companions. In addition to her passion for fashion, music, and photography, she was an avid viewer of classic movies, and often spoke of her desire to become a renowned Hollywood actress. She is known to have conveyed these aspirations to her family and to have combined her sense of humor into everyday family life with lighthearted gestures such as leaving a message on her family's answering machine stating: "You have reached the residence of Queen Rachel and her servants, Larry, Beth, Dana, Craig, and Michael. If you have anything you'd like them to do for me, please leave a message."

Scott was an aspiring writer and actress. In 1998, she performed a mime act to the song "Watch the Lamb" at the school talent show. The tape jammed halfway through the song, Dylan Klebold, who ran audio for the school theater production club, came to her rescue and fixed the tape, leading her to thank him afterwards. Rachel's sister would later perform the same mime act at her funeral.

At the time of her death at age 17, Scott lived in Columbine, Colorado and was debating as to whether she should become an actress or a Christian missionary. She also had plans to visit Botswana as a member of a Christian outreach program to build homes in the upcoming summer, before moving into her own apartment in late 1999.

== Murder ==
Scott's Acura Legend photographed within Clement Park following her murder.

Scott was eating lunch with her friend Richard Castaldo on the lawn outside the west entrance of the school at 11:19 a.m., when Eric Harris shot her four times with a Hi-Point 995. Initially shot in the chest, left arm, and left leg, from a distance of 10 to 15 feet, she sustained a fourth and fatal wound to her left temple. Castaldo was shot eight times and was left permanently paralyzed below the chest from his injuries. Scott was pronounced dead at the scene. Her body was left outside the school and was not retrieved by the coroner until the following morning.

Immediately after killing Scott, Harris and Klebold went on a killing spree around the school, killing 12 more people and leaving 24 injured. The two perpetrators committed suicide in the school library, the place where they murdered the most victims. Scott did not personally know Harris or Klebold. After her death, Scott's car was turned into an impromptu memorial in the adjacent Clement Park after being moved from the school's parking lot by grieving students. A chain-link fence was also installed around the vehicle for mourners to attach their tokens of grief such as flowers, crucifixes, teddy bears, and letters of condolence. The car was ultimately covered by the objects left upon it by mourners. Scott's 16-year-old brother, Craig, was also at the school on the day of the massacre; he was in the library where most of the killings occurred; he survived unharmed, although two of his close friends were also murdered. Craig later expressed extreme regret for his last interaction with his sister: slamming a car door at her when being dropped off at school that morning.

== Funeral ==
Scott was buried at Chapel Hill Memorial Gardens in Centennial on April 24, 1999, following a two-hour funeral service held at the Trinity Christian Center. Her funeral was one of the first services following the massacre and was attended by nearly 2,000 people, including friends and staff at Columbine High School. The Reverend Porter began the service by addressing the congregation with the question, "What has happened to us as a people that this should happen to us?" He then addressed the solemn crowd with a speech that included references to Scott's pious character, kind nature and love of her fellow human, before stating: "You have graduated early from this life to a far better one, where there is no sorrow, violence or death." Her friends from the Orchard Road Christian Church Youth Group also sang a song at the service, composed in her honor, entitled "Why Did You Have to Leave?" Attendees were invited to talk at the service, as "My Heart Will Go On" was played.

Those conveying their eulogies included one youth who had been considered an outcast at Columbine High School, who stated: "All my life I prayed that someone would love me and make me feel wanted. God sent me an angel," before staring at Scott's casket and weeping. Nick Baumgart, who accompanied Scott to the high school prom as her date three days before her murder, also spoke, saying: "A truer friend, you couldn't find. You could be having the worst day of your entire life; all she had to do was smile." Scott's parents chose not to speak at the service, but issued a statement in which they described their daughter as "a girl whose love of life was constantly reflected in her love and zeal for music, drama, photography, and for her friends". Prior to her burial, mourners who had known Scott throughout her life were invited to write messages of condolence, grief and thankfulness on her ivory white casket. Her coffin was adorned with messages of love, gratitude, and grief. The funeral service was broadcast by CNN and MSNBC. At the time, the event was the most watched broadcast in CNN history.

== Legacy ==
=== Martyrdom ===
The circumstances surrounding Scott's death and its relation to her religious beliefs are disputed. While Scott's mother made several claims, including that she had offered to be friends to Klebold, that Klebold was romantically interested in her, that Klebold and Harris mocked her for her religious beliefs, and that her daughter was on a "target list", investigations in the years following the shooting—especially Dave Cullen's findings in his book Columbine—have concluded that Klebold and Harris were not targeting people for their religion, ethnicity, or gender. Scott did not know the two boys personally and was in a different academic grade level than them.

The deaths of both Scott and fellow student and Columbine victim Cassie Bernall were both subsequently described by groups of evangelical Christians as Christian martyrs. (Note: The precise circumstances surrounding Scott's death have been called into question.) This began during Scott's funeral on April 24, 1999, which was televised. At the beginning of the ceremony, Barry Palser, a pastor from an Assemblies of God organization, gave a speech in which he said she was "one who has given [her] life for the Lord Jesus Christ, a modern-day martyr." (Note: Palser also told The Washington Post, "We consider her to be a Christian American martyr.") Pastor Bruce Porter delivered a sermon later in the service, in which he called Rachel a "warrior" who carried "a torch that was stained by the blood of the martyrs from the very first day of the Church's existence". Porter then requested that others pick up the "torch" in Scott's wake.

In the following year's numerous books—termed "hagiographies" by sociologist Ralph Larkin—were published about Scott and Bernall with the assistance of or authorship by their parents. Porter also wrote a book about Scott, making frequent references to sacrifice. Many web pages have been published that are specifically dedicated to Scott and she is prominently featured in more broadly themed Columbine memorial websites. Some of these sites explicitly or implicitly refer to Scott's belief in Christianity and suggest that she was killed because of it. Journalist Hanna Rosin framed public remembrance of her death as part of a phenomenon in which teenage Christians began obsessing over Christian-based death, as a form of a martyr complex. Scott's mother and her brother Craig toured many schools across the United States years after the shooting to speak about Rachel's life, asserting that she probably died because of her religious beliefs. Christian churches used the martyr narrative of Scott's and Bernall's deaths to promote themselves and recruit members.

A frequent feature of Rachel's martyr story is that she had a verbal exchange with Klebold and Harris about her religious beliefs before they killed her. The Hollywood Reporter accounts that Richard Castaldo, who was shot while sitting with Scott and survived, "told a newspaper that not only did the killers ask Rachel about her faith but that he, too, was asked if he believed in God, and he answered truthfully that he did not, and his life was spared." Other sources report that Castaldo had survived by "playing dead". Castaldo was in a coma in the immediate aftermath of the shooting, and thus did not testify to police and his account was not included in the police report on the event. Castaldo said in his speech at Scott's funeral, "People tell me I said she said she believed in God, and I can't remember it," and Larkin wrote in 2007 that Castaldo "could not remember Klebold or Harris saying anything."

=== Rachel's Tears ===
Reviewing their daughter's life and hearing firsthand just how profound an impact Scott's simple acts of kindness had imprinted on the lives of those who had known her, as well as recalling her repeatedly stated desire for her life to have an impact for the better on others, Darrell Scott and Beth Nimmo were inspired to write the book Rachel's Tears, a non-fiction book about their daughter, her faith, her inspirational journal entries, and the impact of her loss on their lives. The book was published on the first anniversary of her death, and is incorporated into the Rachel's Challenge program.

Scott and Nimmo later published two more books inspired by their daughter and her legacy: Rachel Smiles: The Spiritual Legacy of Columbine Martyr Rachel Scott, and The Journals of Rachel Joy Scott: A Journey of Faith at Columbine High. These books were published in 2001 and 2002, respectively. Both parents have expressed their hope that those who did not know their daughter would find inspiration in the books' description of the principles their daughter had lived during her life.

== Rachel's Challenge ==
After reading the essay, My Ethics; My Codes of Life, and the journals Scott had written in the last 16 months of her life, her father founded Rachel's Challenge in 2001. Rachel's Challenge is a national nonprofit and nonpolitical organization whose stated aims are to advocate a safe and positive climate and culture in schools in a campaign to quell school violence, bullying, discrimination, and both homicidal and suicidal thoughts in students. The annual international student outreach of the organization is estimated to be in excess of two million. The program itself typically involves a one-hour audio and video presentation, hosted by the Rachel's Challenge speaker, to assembled students, with the aim of motivating those present to analyze how they treat others. The Rachel's Challenge speakers include Darrell, Craig and Mike Scott; guest speakers include Nicole Nowlen, who was wounded at age 16 in the Columbine High School massacre, and Adam Kyler, a former Columbine student who had harbored suicidal thoughts until Rachel, noting he was the victim of bullying, offered her friendship and support. Rachel's Challenge has since become the most popular school assembly program in the United States.

Each attendee is asked to pledge to accept the five principles discussed during the presentation before leaving the assembly: to eliminate any form of prejudice from their being, and seek only the best in others; to keep a journal and seek to achieve accomplishments; to choose to accept only positive influences in their lives; to commit to bringing a positive change in their home, school, and community through kind words, and undertaking tasks great and small; and to show care and compassion to those who are vulnerable, ridiculed, or in any form of need. A final impetus is to commit to Rachel's theory of the formation of a chain reaction through these five pledges by sharing these commitments with their family members, friends, and peers.

At the close of the program, the audience is asked to close their eyes, and picture five or six people closest to them; they are then asked to tell them how much they mean to them. The initial presentation is followed by a 45-minute, interactive training session involving both adult and student leaders. Participants are trained to perpetuate the chain reaction of kindness envisioned by Scott. The participating school is provided with a curriculum and a training manual to ensure the continuity of the objectives of Rachel's Challenge, and the speaker typically holds a meeting later with parents and community leaders.

Internationally, many schools have incorporated Rachel's Challenge into their internal character building programs, with active efforts made to eradicate any sense of alienation among the student population, and various initiatives implemented to increase cohesion. One initiative to achieve this objective is to establish a "Friends of Rachel" club, to sustain the campaign's goals on an ongoing basis. In addition, many students actively seek to honor Scott's theory of just one person displaying compassion having the potential to spark a chain reaction of the same by spreading her message of kindness, empathy and compassion with their fellow students. As a direct result of Rachel's Challenge, numerous child and teenage suicides have been prevented, and in seven known cases, planned school shootings have been prevented.

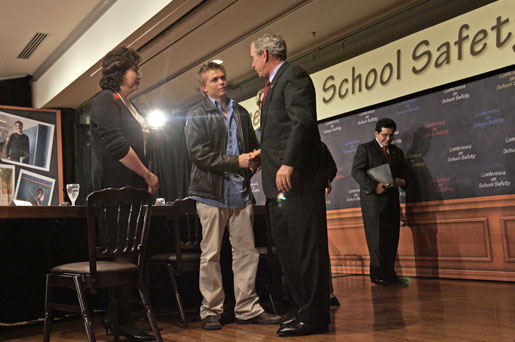
Scott's brother Craig Scott meets President George W. Bush during a 2006 conference devoted to the topic of school safety.

In October 2006, Craig Scott was formally invited to address a National Council on issues relating to safety and security in schools. The meeting was held at the White House with President George W. Bush and included White House staff and educators from across the nation. The conference focused on cultural issues and the accomplishments and personal experiences garnered through Rachel's Challenge.

In a direct recognition of the significant, ongoing, national benefits achieved in schools, colleges, and universities through Rachel's Challenge, the National Education Association of New York awarded Darrell Scott and Rachel's Challenge the "Friend of Education Award" in 2006. Darrell Scott was selected as the 2009 winner of the "All-Stars Among Us" initiative in recognition of his selfless dedication toward preserving his daughter's memory in a positive manner through Rachel's Challenge in the U.S.

Along with 29 other recipients, Scott was formally honored as part of the 2009 Major League Baseball All-Star Game ceremonies, held in St. Louis, Missouri, on July 14 that year. At this ceremony, Darrell Scott stated: "Rachel loved to watch baseball. She had no clue that because of her memory ... I'd be here representing her." Both of Scott's parents have also spoken with entertainers, world leaders, and notable individuals including Miep Gies – one of the people who hid Anne Frank and her family from the Nazis, and preserved her diary after her capture. (Note: Both Rachel Scott and Anne Frank had written of their wishes to change the world for the better through the acts of love and kindness. Additionally, both girls died at a young age through the hatred of others. This has led to parallels being drawn by her father, uncle, and journalist Lisa Kintish between the journals Rachel wrote in her lifespan and Anne Frank's The Diary of a Young Girl.)

Darrell Scott has stated that reliving his daughter's death giving his Rachel's Challenge speeches is painful, but that he and his family consider the opportunity to be a worthwhile experience as they can turn a tragedy into triumph. He notes: "I feel that God has really called me to do this. To pick up the torch my daughter dropped. This is what my daughter would have wanted to see. If I died right now, I can tell you my daughter's prayer has been answered." Rachel's mother, on the 10th anniversary of her daughter's passing, stated: "Only through eternal eyes will she ever know how powerful her life and death became."

== Media ==
=== Film ===
- The 2016 film I'm Not Ashamed is directly based on the life and death of Scott. Directed by Brian Baugh and starring Masey McLain as Rachel Scott, the movie also uses some of the contents of Scott's journals for voice-overs.

=== Books ===
- Nimmo, Beth; Klingsporn, Debra (2000). Rachel's Tears: The Spiritual Journey of Columbine Martyr Rachel Scott. Thomas Nelson Inc. ISBN 978-0-7852-6848-2
- Nimmo, Beth; Klingsporn, Debra (2001). The Journals of Rachel Joy Scott: A Journey of Faith at Columbine High. Thomas Nelson Inc. ISBN 978-1-4041-7560-0
- Scott, Darrell; Rabey, Steve (2001). Chain Reaction: A Call to Compassionate Revolution. Thomas Nelson Inc. ISBN 0-7852-6680-1
- Scott, Darrell; Rabey, Steve (2002). Rachel Smiles: The Spiritual Legacy of Columbine Martyr Rachel Scott. Thomas Nelson Inc. ISBN 978-0-7852-9688-1
- Scott, Darrell; Rabey, Steve (2009). Rachel's Tears: 10 Years after Columbine, Rachel Scott's Faith Lives on. Thomas Nelson Inc. ISBN 978-1-4003-1347-1

== See also ==
- Cassie Bernall
- Christianity in the United States
- Crime in Colorado
- Gun violence in the United States

== Cited works ==
- Larkin, Ralph W. (2007). Comprehending Columbine. Temple University Press. ISBN 978-1-5921-3490-8.
- Pike, Sarah M. (September 2009). "Dark Teens and Born-Again Martyrs: Captivity Narratives after Columbine". Journal of the American Academy of Religion. 77 (3): 647–679. doi:10.1093/jaarel/lfp038. JSTOR 20630144. PMID 20681084.
- Senie, Harriet F. (2016). "The Conflation of Heroes and Victims: A New Memorial Paradigm". A Companion to Public Art (online ed.). John Wiley & Sons, Inc. pp. 107–118. ISBN 9781118475331.
- Watson, J. (2003). The Martyrs of Columbine: Faith and the Politics of Tragedy. Springer. ISBN 9781403970008.
