= Anne Marie Hochhalter =

American gun violence activist (1981–2025)

- Born: December 19, 1981; Bismarck, North Dakota, U.S.
- Died: February 16, 2025 (aged 43); Westminster, Colorado, U.S.
- Cause of death: Sepsis complicated by gunshot wounds
- Occupation: Anti-gun violence activist
- Known for: Sustaining injuries during the Columbine High School massacre

Anne Marie Hochhalter (December 19, 1981 – February 16, 2025) was an American anti-gun violence activist who was an initial survivor, but later fatal victim of the Columbine High School massacre. She was shot in the chest and back by Eric Harris during the attack at age 17, and was paralyzed from the waist down, with a spinal cord injury and intense nerve pain for the rest of her life. In the decades that followed, she spoke out against gun violence and opposed publicizing killers' names in the media as part of the No Notoriety movement, arguing that social media companies were profiting from violent content. She was also an advocate for supplemental Social Security payments for people with disabilities.

Six months after the Columbine shooting, Anne Marie's mother Carla, who had been suffering from depression and mental health issues previously, shot and killed herself in a pawn shop after asking to see a revolver. In 2009, Hochhalter told U.S. News & World Report that she had found it "very hard to understand" that her mother had committed suicide with a gun after her daughter had been injured by one. Anne Marie Hochhalter died in 2025 from sepsis complicated by her two gunshot wounds.

== Life after the shooting ==
Although she returned to Columbine High School for her senior year and attended a local community college, Hochhalter initially struggled to move on with her life. In 2001, her father decided to move the family including Anne Marie and her brother Nathan to a home in the mountains an hour away from the Littleton area, where they lived previously. Hochhalter later said that her time living in isolation in the mountains was "one of [her] darkest hours", leading her to contemplate suicide.

In 2002, Hochhalter started to turn her life around, relying on her faith and her determination to become independent. She bought her own townhouse near her church using money from the insurance settlement from the shooters' parents. Learning to maneuver herself in a wheelchair, she re-learned how to drive, and went back to college. Hochhalter began a part-time job at Bath & Body Works, where she later became a manager. She counseled other people with disabilities, supported other survivors of gun violence, and worked with rescue dogs.

Over time, she became close to Sue and Rick Townsend, whose daughter, Lauren, had been killed in the school shooting. Sue Townsend had initially offered to take Hochhalter to her medical appointments and physical therapy as a way of coping with her own grief. The Townsends later referred to her as their "acquired daughter", even going on vacation with her to Hawaii, where Hochhalter was able to float in a lagoon pain-free.

In 2016, Hochhalter wrote a letter on Facebook addressed to Sue Klebold, the mother of one of the gunmen, who was releasing her memoir, A Mother's Reckoning. In the post, Hochhalter quoted the "genuine and personal" letter she had received from the gunman's parents a few months after she was paralyzed, and expressed gratitude for the author's decision to donate all proceeds from the book to helping people with mental illness. She concluded by saying, "I have forgiven you", and wrote, "Hindsight is truly 20/20 and I'm sure you have agonized over what you could have done differently. I know, because I do the same thing with trying to think of ways I could have prevented my mother's death. I have no ill-will towards you."

On the 24th anniversary of the Columbine shooting on April 20, 2023, Hochhalter wrote on Facebook, "My wounds were the worst ones the doctors saw that day, and a few months later, one of them told me that when I get older, I have to be prepared for it to catch up to me".

== Death ==
Hochhalter was found dead on February 16, 2025, at her home in Westminster, Colorado at age 43. She had died due to sepsis, complicated by the two gunshot wounds that she sustained during the 1999 Columbine attack nearly 26 years earlier. On March 13, 2025, the Jefferson County Coroner's Office ruled her death a homicide linked to the attack.
