= Culture of violence theory =

The culture of violence theory addresses the pervasiveness of specific violent patterns within a societal dimension. The concept of violence being ingrained in a culture has been around for at least the 20th century. Developed from structural violence, as research progressed the notion that a culture can sanction violent acts developed into what we know as culture of violence theory today. Two prominent examples of culture legitimizing violence can be seen in rape myths and victim blaming. Rape myths lead to misconstrued notions of blame; it is common for the responsibility associated with the rape to be placed on the victim rather than the offender.

Furthermore, the culture of violence theory potentially accounts for inter-generational theories of violence and domestic violence. Childhood exposure to violence in the household may later lead to similar patterns in marital relations. Similarly, early experience with domestic violence is likely to increase an individual's potential for development of clinical symptoms. Additionally, presence of a preexisting mental disorder may heighten the chances of becoming involved in an abusive relationship.

There are many factors which contribute to the persistence of violence among individuals and on a societal level; gender is one relevant factor to understanding the culture of violence theory. In the United States, a majority of reported rapes involve female victims. However, there is a growing body of evidence to support the notion that women can perpetuate relational cycles of violence. While a culture of violence has an impact on people as a whole, for individuals who have experienced trauma in their lives the impact can be much larger.

== Development of the theory ==
The culture of violence theory addresses the pervasiveness of specific violent patterns within a societal dimension. Specifically, it explains how cultures and societies can sanction violent acts. While related to structural violence, cultural violence theory is different by explaining why direct acts of violence or violence built into societal systems exist and how they are legitimized. Research suggests that cultures can encourage and permit violence to exist as a response to various environmental obstacles, such as widespread resource impoverishment. This can be seen within various aspects of culture, such as film, television, music, language, art, and propaganda.

Austrian peace researcher Franz Jedlicka has made an attempt to measure the culture of violence in different countries of the world with his "Culture of Violence Scale 2023".

== Relation to cultural values in the United States ==
=== Rape myths ===
Rape myths refer to the inaccurate views and stereotypes of forced sexual acts, and the victims and perpetuators of them. These notions are prevalent among the general population and often suggest that the victims of non-consensual sexual acts have bad reputations, are promiscuous, dress provocatively, or are fabricating assault when they regret the consensual acts after the fact. These views are often legitimized by the status quo of men dominating women across domains such as family, education, work, and many others. Rape myth acceptance can lead to poor assault and rape prevention measures, decrease in reporting of assaults/rapes, increases of assaults/rapes, and re-victimization.

=== Violence in relationships ===
Violence in relationships, commonly referred to as intimate partner violence (IPV), is impacted by various factors including the presence of mental illness or use of substances. Specifically, individuals with depression, generalized anxiety (GAD), or panic disorder are potentially at risk for physical violence towards a partner; findings are consistent for both men and women regarding the connection between psychiatric diagnoses and perpetuation of relationship violence. Additionally, propensity to engage in specific behaviors such as gambling or endorsement of violent pornography have also been associated with increased risk for relationship violence occurrence. Individual factors have also been suggested to be associated with relationship violence including anger, aggressiveness, and adverse emotional internalization. Contrarily, exposure to relationship violence is also linked to the later development of mental health symptoms or diagnoses.

=== Violence in pop culture and media ===
The prevalence of legitimization of violence may be facilitated by its presence in various media. There is evidence to suggest that sex-related crimes account for nearly 10% of all dialogue on television related to sex, most of which is found on fictional programs. Additionally, research has also found a positive relationship between pornography consumption and attitudes supporting violence against women, especially when the pornography in question is violent in nature. However, consideration of individual differences is necessary in evaluating exposure to violent media and overall outcomes. Factors which influence media content exposure and subsequent outcomes include gender and personality traits. Individuals who are male, hostile, impulsive, and are low on empathy are more likely to be susceptible to violent media exposure.

=== Public justification of violence ===
Public justification of violence arises when those not necessarily directly involved in a violent act do not react negatively to the violence because they believe it is warranted. Examples of public justification of violence are most evident in rape myths and victim blaming, as discussed above. However, the common belief regarding legitimate violence tends to place responsibility on victims or potential victims of violence. Another example less often noted is the pervasive notion of the "chosen one" within some extremist religious language and nationalist propaganda that functions as a means to perpetuate the undermining of the other and allowance of violence against the other.

== In the Ottoman Empire and Turkey ==
Turkish sociologist Fatma Müge Göçek has argued that the Armenian genocide and other violent repression in the Ottoman Empire was caused by the Committee of Union and Progress' adoption of a "culture of violence"; she argues that this culture of violence remains embedded in Turkish political culture.

== See also ==
- Crime statistics
