= Rachel's Tears =

Book by Darrell Scott, Beth Nimmo and Steve Rabey

Rachel's Tears: The Spiritual Journey of Columbine Martyr Rachel Scott
- Author: Darrell Scott, Beth Nimmo, Steve Rabey
- Language: English
- Publisher: Thomas Nelson Publishers
- Publication date: April 20, 2000
- Pages: 181
- ISBN: 978-0-7852-6848-2

Rachel's Tears: The Spiritual Journey of Columbine Martyr Rachel Scott is a non-fiction book about Rachel Scott, the first victim of the Columbine High School massacre.

Written by her parents, including her journal entries, it is part of a nationwide school outreach program and ministry. They present Rachel as being killed for her Christian affirmation.

Darrell Scott traveled around the United States to promote the book. He said that during his travels he heard many stories about school death threats and that this compelled him to spread the message of his daughter. Scott said the number was "by far, more than are reported in the media."

== Bibliography ==
- Darrell Scott, Beth Nimmo, Steve Rabey, Rachel's Tears: The Spiritual Journey of Columbine Martyr Rachel Scott, Thomas Nelson Publishers, 2000, ISBN 978-0-7852-6848-2

== See also ==
- She Said Yes: The Unlikely Martyrdom of Cassie Bernall
