= Active shooter training =

Disaster training for active shooter situations

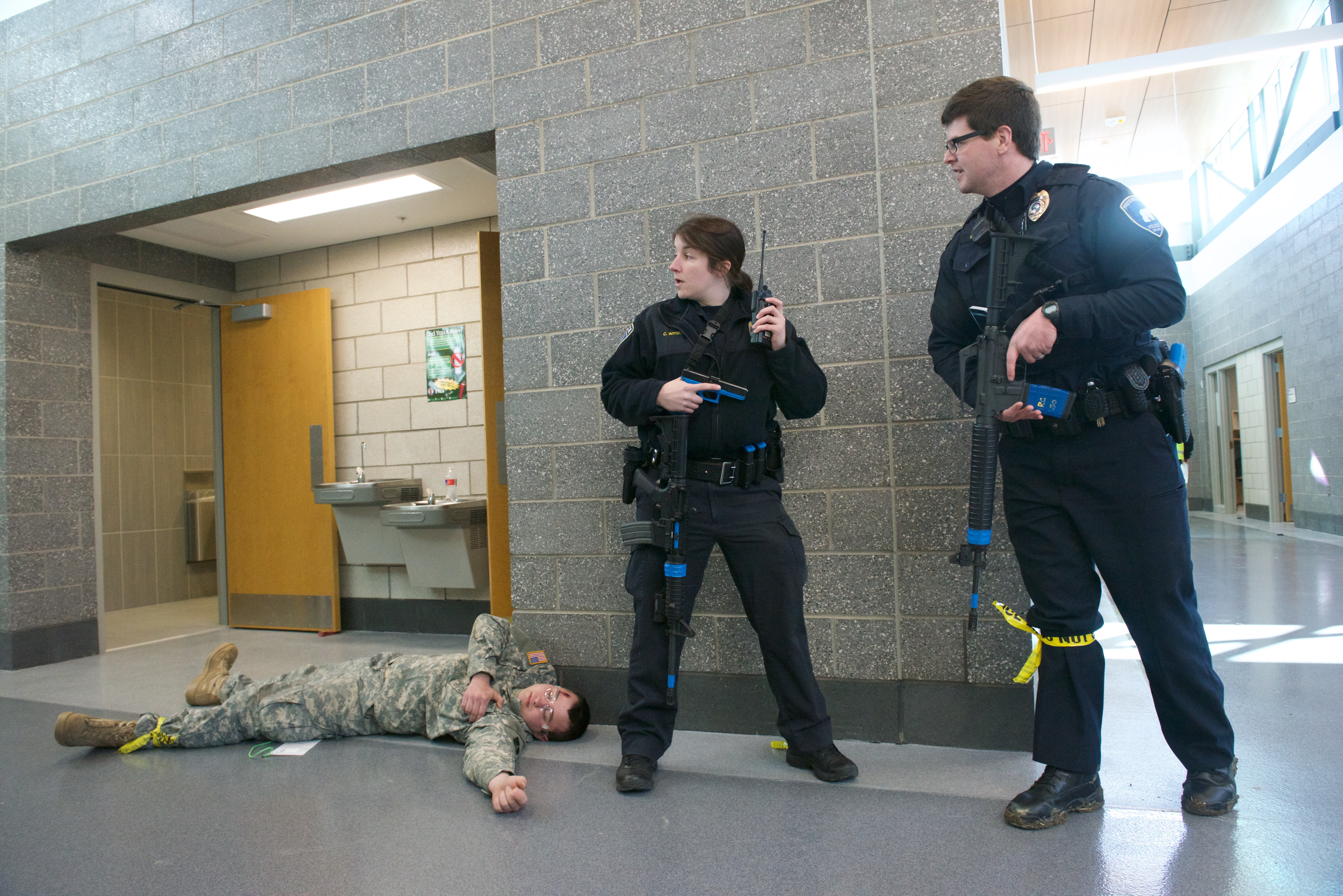
Ramsey County, Minnesota law enforcement officers next to a simulated casualty during an active shooter response exercise at the Arden Hills Army Training Site

Active shooter training (sometimes termed active shooter response training or active shooter preparation) addresses the threat of an active shooter by providing awareness, preparation, prevention, and response methods.

Organizations such as businesses, places of worship or education, choose to sponsor active shooter training in light of a concern that as of 2013, 66.9% of active shooter incidents ended before police arrival in the United States. The Department of Justice says they remain "committed to assist training for better prevention, response, and recovery practices involving active shooter incidents" and they encourage training for civilians as well as first responders.

Although training is currently optional, businesses and organizations are beginning to face citations due to non-compliance with Occupational Safety and Health Administration (OSHA) guidelines regarding workplace violence.

The Federal Bureau of Investigation (FBI) further stresses that civilian training and exercises should include: ‘an understanding of the threats faced and also the risks and options available in active shooter incidents.

== Legal requirements ==
In the United States, OSHA has made recommendations for businesses when it comes to active shooting and the workplace. Their guidelines within certain organizations also extend to building securities and facilities structures, as well as properly implemented active shooter preparation training. Lawmakers have also held organizations accountable for not having appropriate training or other protocols in place, citing OSHA's general duty clause. In 2017, the Department of Labor published the new "Enforcement Procedures and Scheduling for Occupational Exposure to Workplace Violence" which provides policy guidance and procedures to be followed when issuing citations related to workplace violence.

Given these changes, active shooter response training is quickly becoming a standard across America. Current active shooter training methods range from books to videos to multi-day on-site courses, but not all fall under OSHA's guidelines or judges approvals.

== Types of training ==
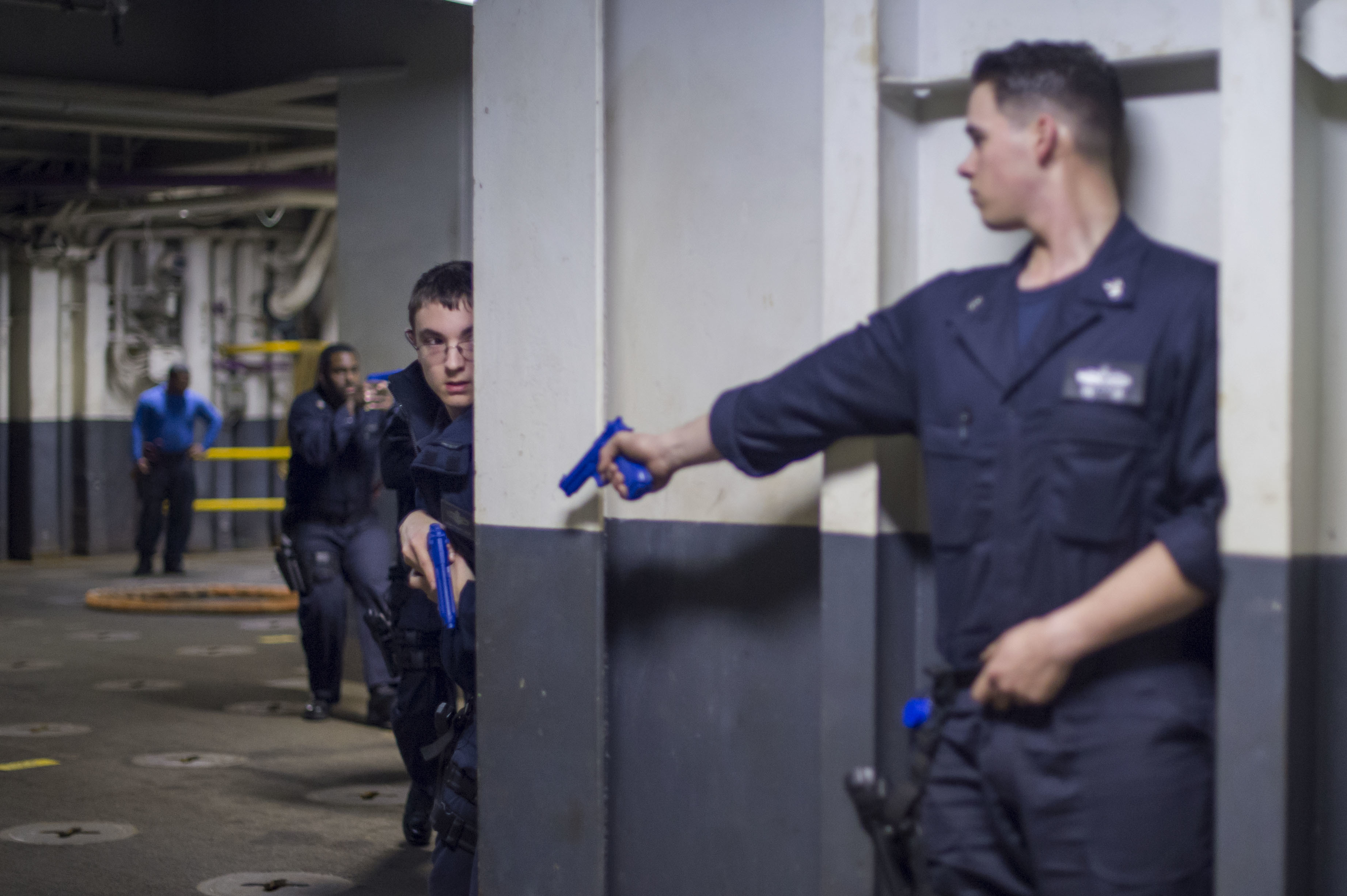
U.S. Navy yeomen aboard the USS Bonhomme Richard (LHD-6) during an active shooter drill. The yeoman on the right is playing an active shooter.

Much analysis has been done on the techniques and methods of active shooters. In response to the data, some training programs include a focus on medical response for civilians, whereas other training programs place their attention on prevention, self defense, security of the building, escape during the event, psychology or physical escape. Common ideologies frequently taught are "Run/Hide/Fight" as put forth by the Department of Homeland Security (DHS), "Avoid, Deny, Defend" (ADD) which was developed by the ALERRT center at Texas State University, "ALICE" which is an acronym for "Alert, Lockdown, Inform, Counter, Evacuate" offered by Navigate 360, and "STAAAT" or "Situational Threat Awareness, Assessment, and Action Training" developed by Alesian Group. There are differing viewpoints on the effectiveness of certain concepts, and the standards are constantly being updated with new data and methods.

== Training for law enforcement ==
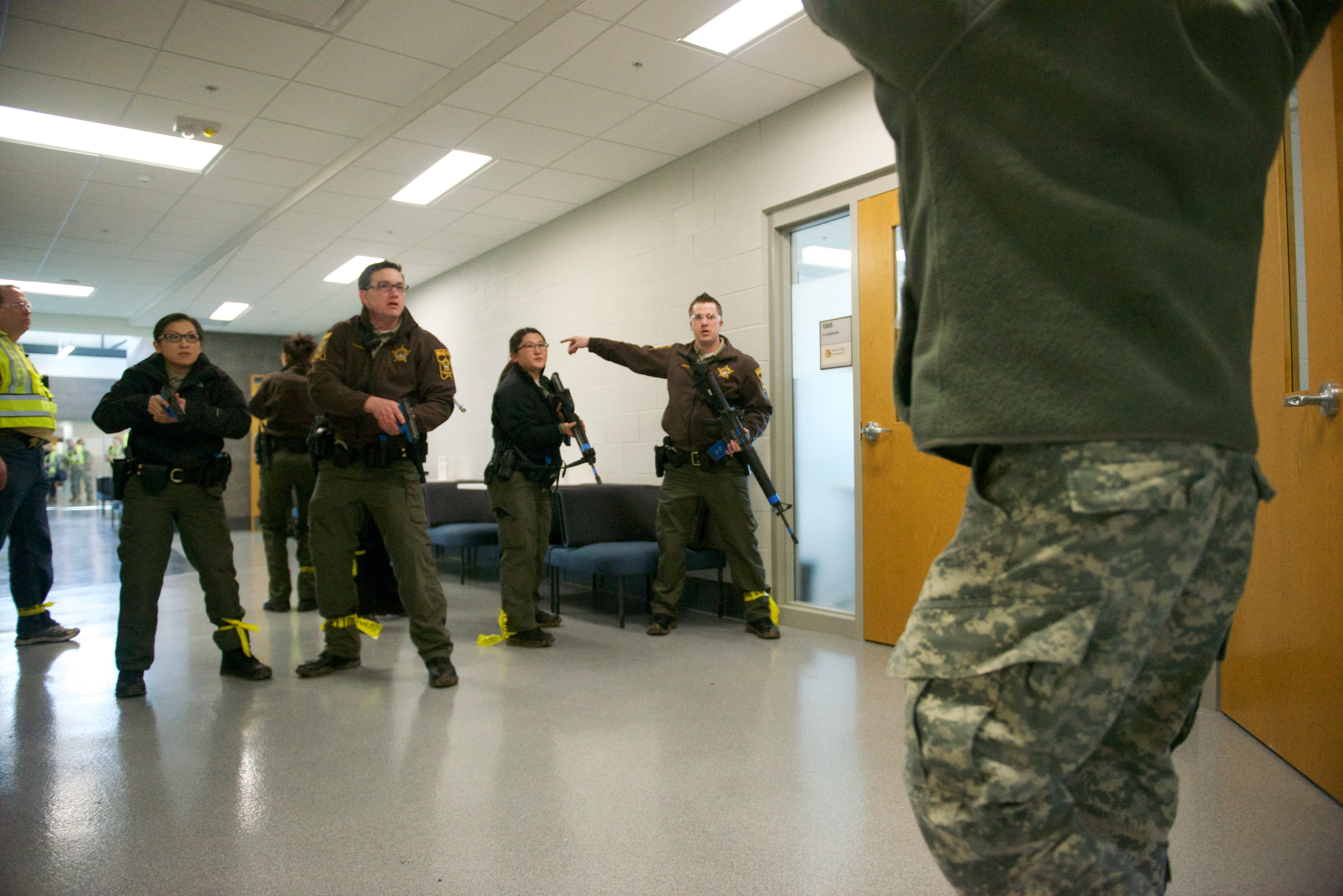
Ramsey County Sheriff's Office deputies directing a civilian during an active shooter exercise at the Arden Hills Army Training Site

Many training programs focus on a particular group or groups of people. ALERRT (Advanced Law Enforcement Rapid Response Training), in conjunction with CRASE, and FLETC (Federal Law Enforcement Training Center) are examples of Federal- and State-level training, intended to help first responders and federal agents know how to respond to an active shooting. Other local agencies are also joining the fight and instituting their own form of training.

== Training for organizations ==
Active shooter response training should not be confused with speech seminars, continuing education courses, or requesting a visit from local law enforcement. The FBI stresses the importance that training and exercises for citizens include an understanding of the threats faced and also the risks and options available in active shooter incidents. Private programs are available to organizations, businesses, schools (and more) which provide training in how to respond to or prepare for an active shooter.

Active shooter response training has become a service in demand given the increase in active shooting events in the United States, as well as to the continuing changes in laws, litigation, and OSHA requirements. There are few active shooter training programs available to the public, and not all agree on what are the correct methods for addressing the issue. The FBI urges everyone to receive proper training:

Recognizing the increased active shooter threat and the swiftness with which active shooter incidents unfold, [our] study results support the importance of training and exercises— not only for law enforcement but also for citizens...even when law enforcement was present or able to respond within minutes, civilians often had to make life and death decisions, and therefore, should be engaged in training and discussions on decisions they may face.

== Training for schools ==
Schools have changed the way they approach the possibility of an active shooter entering the building. The different strategies that students and staff used at the Virginia Tech shooting in 2007, made significant difference in the number of injuries. It can be concluded that the more resistance that the staff and students used, the less likely the shooter could enter the room. For example, the room of fourteen people that gave the active shooter no resistance on entry had ten fatalities and two injuries, so a total of 85.7% of people in the room, while the room of twelve people that had a strong barricade of a table and body weight only had the one injury with zero fatalities, totaling to 8.3% of the room. It is more effective to give an active shooter resistance on entry than to give no resistance at all. However, the room of nineteen people that gave a weak barricade of just a table in front of the door suffered twelve fatalities and six injuries, which totals to 94.8% of the people in the room. This could have been due to there being more people in the room, or the resistance made the shooter frustrated, which made him lash out more. No certain conclusions can be made, however, as the shooter took his own life after the incident. The reason for this discrepancy is time. The classroom that had the weak barricade (Room 211) only had seconds to react. They only knew there was an active shooter when the Professor saw him in the hallway, and he was at the door to the classroom within seconds after she saw him. On the other hand, the other classroom (Room 205) had more time to build a better barricade because they knew about the shooting early on (the reason for that one injury is because the substitute professor was peeking out of the door when Cho was finished with the first room and Cho took a shot at him). By the Cho reached the classroom (which was the second-to-last classroom he hit) they have already had minutes to set up a barricade.

== Training and insurance ==
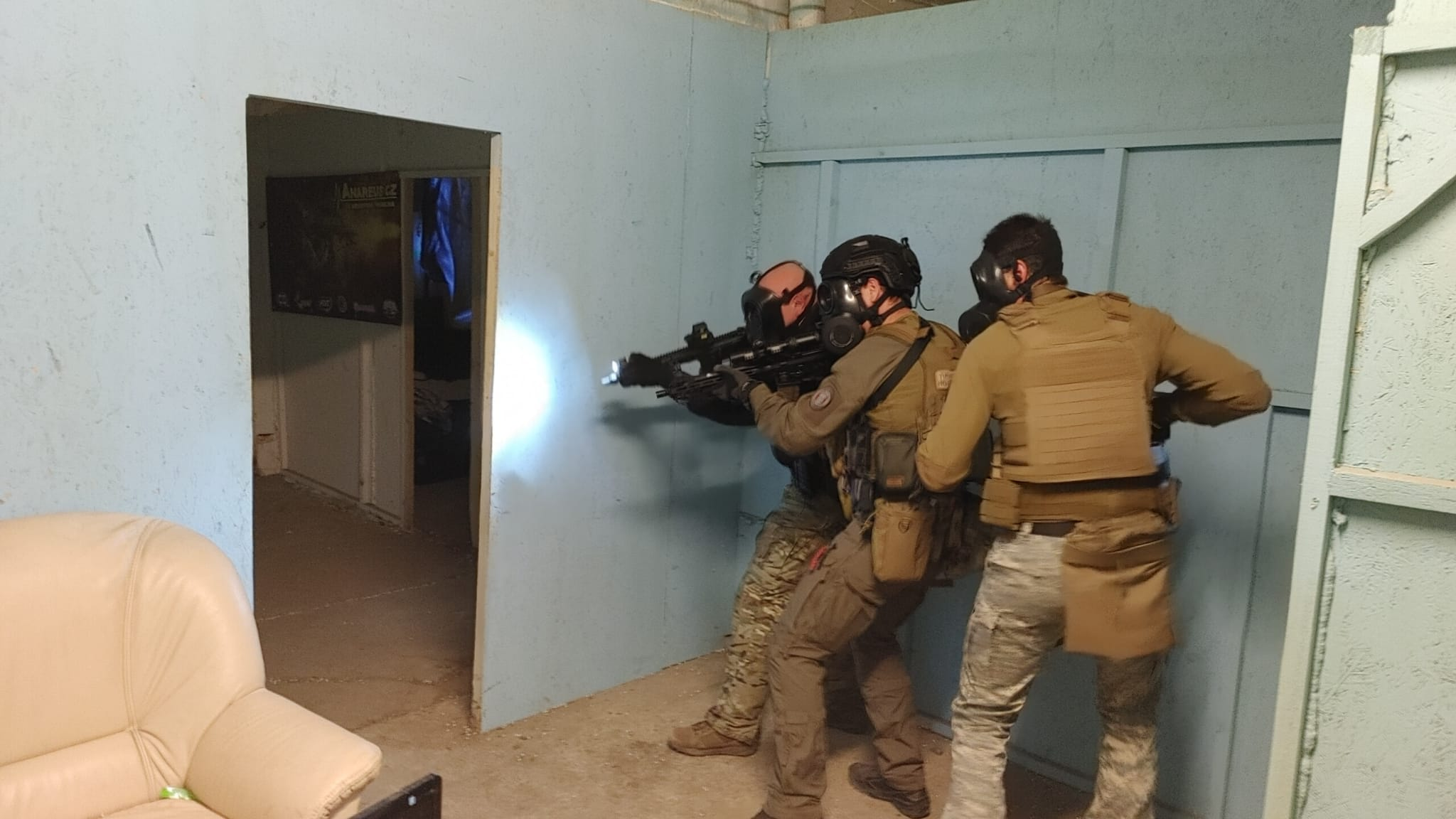
Czech Designated Rereserves (armed civilians) training CQB elimination of active shooter

FBI study results reveal that as of 2013, 45.6% of incidents occurred in areas of commerce, including those open and closed to pedestrian traffic. The second-largest area for incidents was places of education at 24.4%. From 2013 to 2018, the trends have remained similar, with more events occurring at places of business. Demand for a new active shooter insurance has increased, with some policies now offering discounts to those organizations who have received prior and qualifying active shooter training. Some schools and organizations are already spending millions on active shooter insurance, as it is becoming a growing necessity.

== Controversy ==
=== Risks vs. benefits ===
Those who plan training programs determine what should be conveyed in the drills, or if there should be drills at all.

In the United States, there has been some controversy over the effectiveness of active shooter training programs. Organizations disagree whether teaching youth to "fight" the active shooter (as referenced in the DHS "Run, Hide, Fight" directive) is dangerous or effective. While the Department of Education does not recommend that students try to fight an active shooter, the FBI senior executive in charge of its active shooter initiative believes that fighting is often an unfortunate necessity and points out that individuals can at least train to fight.

After the Marjory Stoneman Douglas High School shooting in Parkland, Florida, in February 2018, it was suggested training programs could yield strategic information to potential shooters. Like most U.S. states, Florida requires schools to test their plans with drills. The shooter, a former student, may have been familiar with the school's drills and emergency plans regarding active shootings; some alleged that he used the information to increase casualties. The school had received active shooter training before the actual shooting occurred, yet the 2018 shooting was the deadliest school shooting in the United States since the Sandy Hook Elementary School shooting in 2012.

There is a movement among national teacher organizations to end these drills. One such voice is the Massachusetts Teachers Association labor union. Merrie Najimy, the head of the MTA, said in 2020 that the drills are "scary" and "stressful" for students and that "lockdown is just a narrow and fear-based view of how to address a serious problem. It doesn't get at the root causes." It has been argued the drills and training programs are too traumatic for the students and that the training is more harmful—emotionally and mentally—than beneficial.

=== Effectiveness and qualifications ===
Other controversies arise over the effectiveness of certain programs or the qualifications and tactics used by those teaching them. For instance, some trainers focus solely on the training acronyms and directions, no matter the situation. Others deem this type of training as ineffective and are instead advocating for a scenario-based training protocol.

Some training programs are created by police, school resource officers, or SWAT, while others are created by current or former military, Special Operations, psychologists, Federal agents, or more. Some citizens and other professionals express concern that first responders do not have the appropriate credentials to direct an active shooter response training program for civilians. The expressed concern is that some first responders are not adequately trained in active shooting response strategies and either have not received, are currently receiving or only recently received their own training through the ALERRT (or like) program—thereby representing inadequate qualifications or experience to be training others. The FBI indicates that some officers and agents are under-experienced and under-educated in how to handle active shootings, even as a first responder. Broward County Sheriff's Office, for example, also received widespread criticism for their handling of the Stoneman Douglas school shooting as first responders. The public outcry was focused on the inadequacies of first responders in addressing active shootings at all.

Schools have changed the way that they approach the possibility of an active shooter entering the building. The different strategies that students and staff used at the Virginia Tech shooting in 2007, made significant difference in the amount of injuries. It can be concluded that the more resistance that the staff and students used, the less likely the shooter could enter the room.

=== Police responses ===
Over the time that school shootings have taken place, there have been some incidents of law enforcement response time not living up to what is expected of them. For example, video from the school shooting in Uvalde, Texas, showed officers waiting in the halls as the active shooter was making his way through the building and harming young students. The video footage that revealed this to the public sparked outrage amongst the community as people demanded answers as to why law enforcement would allow young children to become victims to such a horrific incident. In stark contrast, the police response from the Nashville school shooting showed that it’s possible for officers to clear a building, neutralize the threat, and minimize casualties within minutes. When comparing the footage from these two responses, the Uvalde officers failed to locate the shooter in a timely manner, they fled from the sound of gunfire, and withheld the footage from the public for weeks. On the other hand, the Nashville police found and neutralized the shooter and released the footage within 24 hours.

=== Certifications ===
Until 2019, there were no regulating or certifying agencies for the qualifications of active shooter response training directors, trainers, or programs. There has been only one certifying organization—the National Active Shooter Preparation and Recovery Administration—which claims to hold active shooter training professionals to a certain standard. The industry of active shooter response training has gone and can continue to go unregulated, since certification is not mandatory. Even OSHA, with their citations, recommendations, and compliance requirements, does not mandate a certain set of prerequisites for active shooter training directors or trainers.

=== Lack of drill safety ===
Another area of public critique was seen when Indiana State Teachers Association expressed concern over the event in which their active shooter training from the ALICE program was incorporated with a drill that resulted in teachers being shot with pellet guns execution-style, leaving staff with welts and blood drawn. They called for a focus on educator and student safety during trainings and drills, and requested mental health be added to the House Bill 1004.

=== Discrimination ===
Other controversies stem from the actors used during mock drills and the ways in which the shooter was presented. In one such incident, a Penn-Trafford School District employee wore a checkered keffiyeh, drawing controversy over allegations that the depiction unfairly represented Arab Americans and that the depiction was meant to sow distrust of American Muslims; the school district denied such intents, stating they did not intend to depict any specific individual or group with the shooter's outfit.

=== Media coverage ===
Media plays a large part of the public's knowledge when it comes to school shootings, especially today's youth. When there is a mass shooting, it gets posted on the news and the internet within moments. Once it is public knowledge, it is posted to all social media either by a news cooperation or people that want to share to spread the awareness.

There have been times where social media posts have assisted law enforcement in the prevention or neutralization of mass shootings. For example, the 25-year-old that opened fire on the Louisville, Kentucky bank livestreamed the attack. This led to a faster response and stopped any further casualties. There are many examples that could showcase the negativity that people tend to lean towards when it comes to talking about mass shootings. Media focuses on the shooter more than the victims by sharing their names, motivations, and stories for long periods of time after the event. When this happens, it increases the likelihood of a copycat shooter, as some may desire the same level of publicity.
