= Columbine High School =

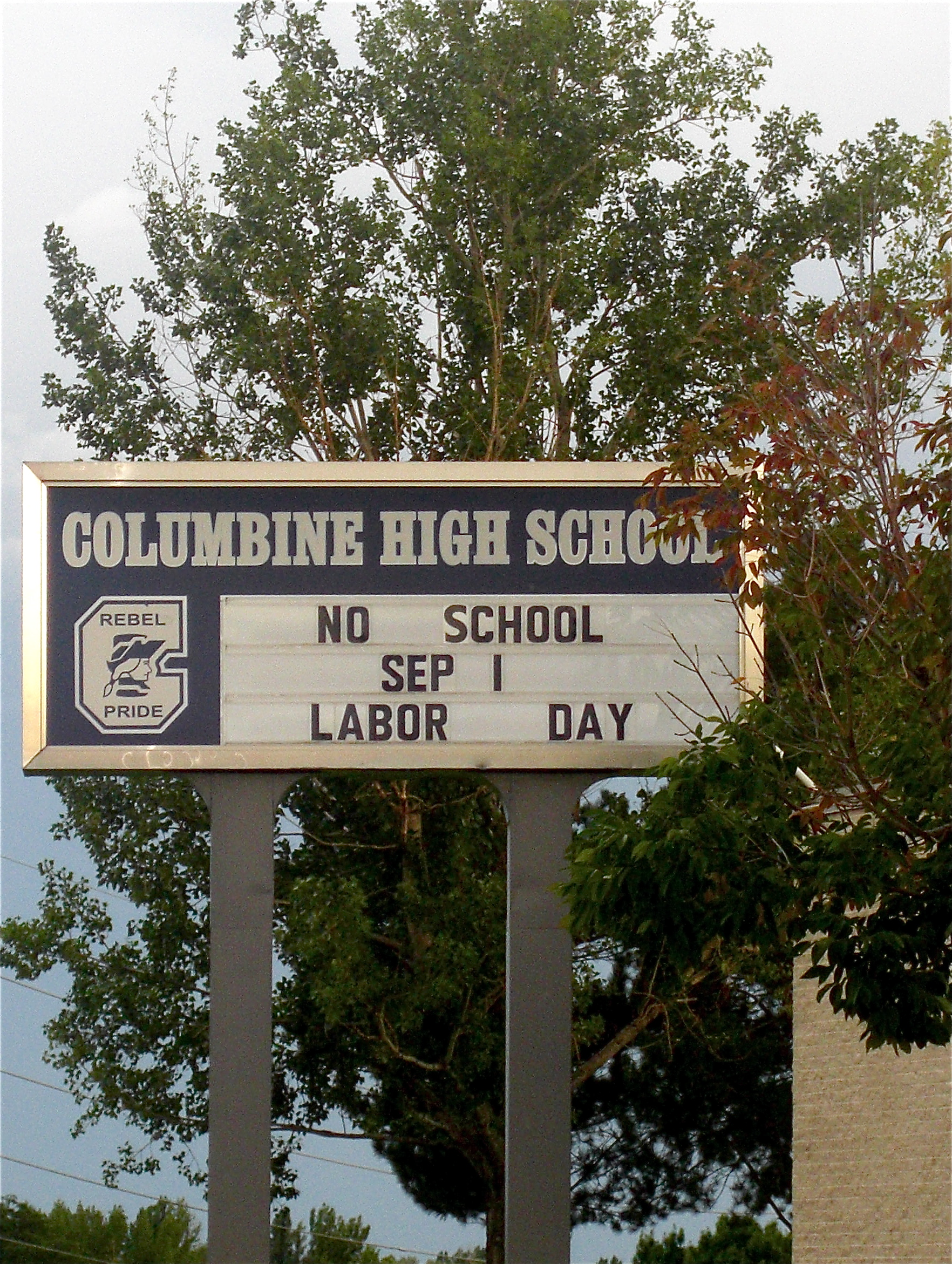

Location
- 6201 South Pierce Street; Littleton, Colorado 80123; United States; 39°36′14″N 105°04′27″W

Information
- Other name: CHS
- Type: Public high school
- Established: 1973
- School district: Jefferson County R-1
- NCES School ID: 080480000707
- Principal: Scott Christy
- Teaching staff: 82.47 (on an FTE basis)
- Grades: 9–12
- Enrollment: 1,710 (2024–25)
- Student to teacher ratio: 20.73
- Campus type: Suburban
- Colors: Navy blue and silver
- Athletics conference: CHSAA
- Mascot: Rebel
- Nickname: Rebels
- Website: columbinehs.jeffcopublicschools.org
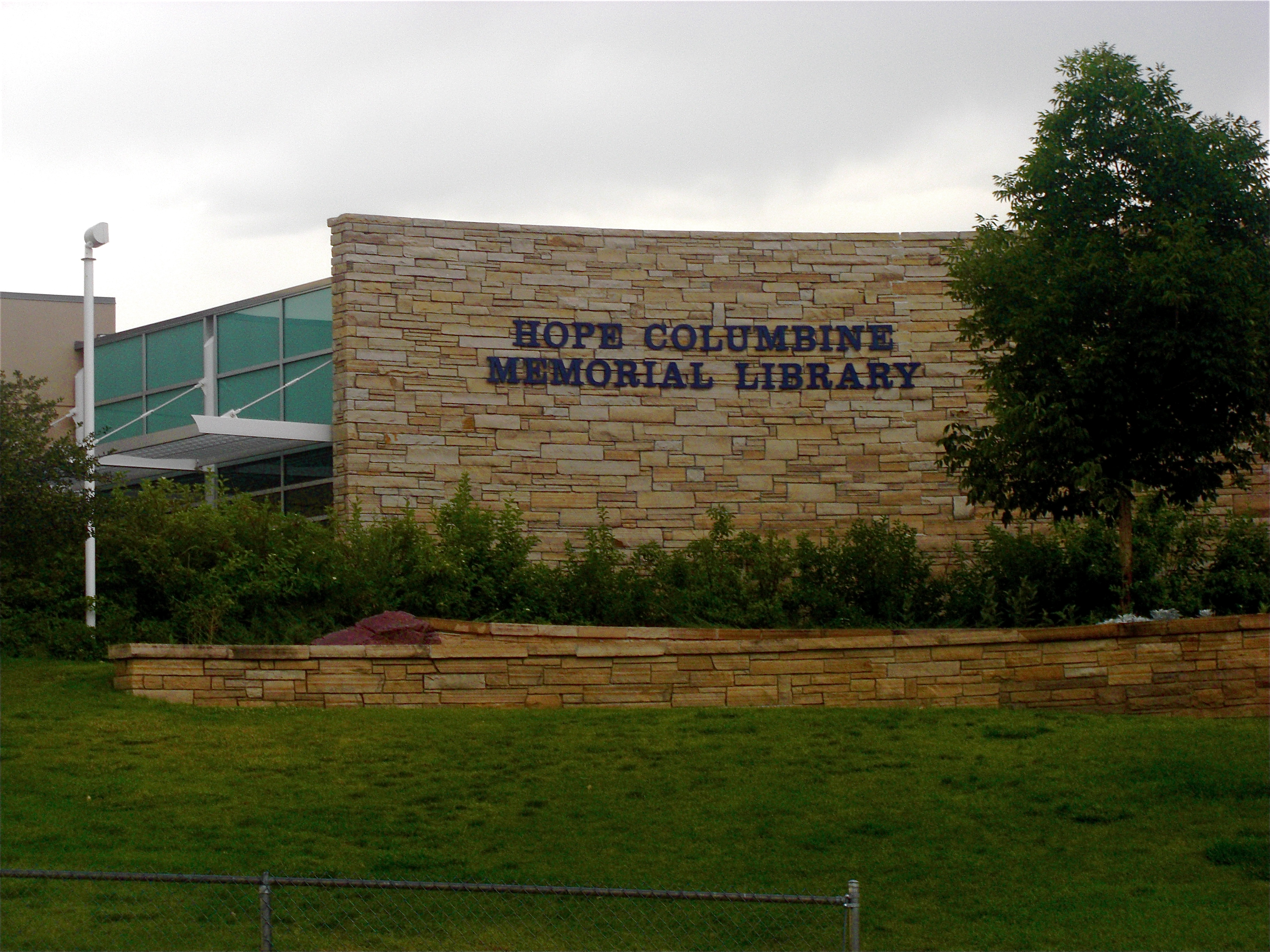
- The library built after the massacre.

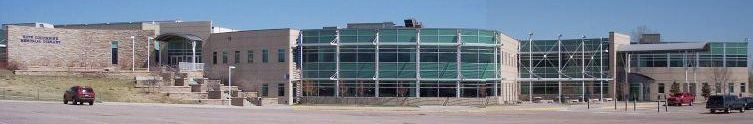
Columbine High School in 2006

Columbine High School (CHS) is a public high school in Columbine, Colorado, United States. It is part of Jefferson County Public Schools. In the 2024–25 academic year, it enrolled 1,710 students.

The school is not in the city limits of Littleton. The school's mailing address uses the postal city "Littleton, CO". Multiple media outlets described the school as being in Littleton.

The school became known in 1999 for the Columbine High School massacre, in which 13 students (Note: Anne Marie Hochhalter, who was one of the wounded victims, died in 2025.) and one teacher were murdered by senior students Eric Harris and Dylan Klebold before the pair committed suicide.

== History ==
Columbine High School opened in 1973 with a capacity for 1,652 students. It was named after the surrounding community of Columbine, which in turn was named after the state flower of Colorado: the columbine. The school's first principal was Gerald Difford. There was no senior class during the school's first year; its first graduating class was in 1975. The school colors were selected through a vote by students at Ken Caryl Junior High School and Bear Creek High School, who were the first to attend Columbine High School when it opened in 1973.

The school has undergone significant renovations since it first opened: in 1995, with the addition of a new cafeteria and library; in 1999–2000, with interior renovations to the corridors, cafeteria, and former library; and in the early 2000s, with the addition of the new HOPE Columbine Memorial Library and a memorial on the site.

=== Massacre ===
Columbine High School was the site of one of the deadliest mass shootings in modern United States history. The shootings occurred on April 20, 1999, when senior students Eric Harris and Dylan Klebold opened fire and killed 13 students and a teacher, additionally wounding 23 others before they both committed suicide in the library. The massacre made headlines both nationally and internationally, making Columbine a household name, and causing a moral panic in U.S. high schools. It was the deadliest high school shooting in U.S. history until it was surpassed by the Parkland high school shooting on February 14, 2018, in which 17 people were killed.

After the shooting, classes at Columbine were held at nearby Chatfield Senior High for the remaining three weeks of that school year.

The school went through a major renovation in 1995, just four years before the massacre, adding a new library and cafeteria. After the shootings, Columbine completely demolished its library, located above the cafeteria, since it was the site where the majority of the deaths occurred. The site was then turned into a memorial ceiling and atrium; a new, larger library was built on the hill where the shooting began and dedicated to the memory of the victims.

By 2019, the school remained a "macabre tourist attraction" for those fascinated by the massacre, with hundreds stopped annually caught trespassing on the grounds or trying to enter the buildings. In June 2019, the superintendent of Jefferson County Public Schools proposed tearing down the school and rebuilding it more securely to lessen its "morbid fascination".

One of the initial survivors of the shooting, Anne Marie Hochhalter, died at the age of 43 of complications from the gunshot wounds she received in the shooting on February 16, 2025, almost 26 years after the shooting occurred. Her death was officially classified as a homicide, making her the 14th official victim of the Columbine High School massacre.

=== 2019 shooting threat ===
On April 15, 2019, 18-year old Sol Pais bought three one-way tickets from Miami International Airport to Denver, Colorado. After arriving in Colorado, Pais bought a pump-action shotgun and ammunition from a dealer she had previously been in contact with.

On April 16, the captain of the Miami Beach Police Department alerted agents with the FBI field office in Miami about a "potential school shooter who is infatuated with Columbine shooter Eric Harris". Shortly after Pais was reported missing, investigators gained access to Pais' email, which revealed information for the gun sellers Pais had contacted in Florida. The FBI contacted Pais' Uber driver, who described Pais as cheerful and fluent in Spanish, and had "travelled to Colorado for recreation and was excited to see snow".

At this point, the FBI decided to alert the public due to the danger of a copycat 20th anniversary shooting around April 20 at or near Columbine High School, although April 20 that year was a Saturday. After the manhunt became public, it quickly made national headlines, and hundreds of people called the FBI claiming they had seen Pais panhandling, buying a gun or actually outside of Columbine High School. Columbine High School went on lockdown on the afternoon of April 16, and was dismissed normally at the end of the day. With the FBI finding no trace of Pais by the end of the day, Columbine and several dozen schools closed for the day, keeping more than 500,000 students across the state home.

According to Pais' autopsy, however, Pais was already deceased before the manhunt even started on April 15. She had taken about a 40-minute Uber drive from DIA to a mall, and then purchased a shotgun and ammunition from the dealer she had been in contact with previously, before taking another Uber ride from the gun shop "into the mountains" near Mount Evans. According to this Uber driver, Pais "had no food or water and only minimal clothing," and had a "green rifle case" with a "bird hunting gun". Pais apparently committed suicide by gunshot to the head later that night.

== Academics ==
=== Enrollment ===
In the 2024–25 academic year, Columbine High School enrolled 1,710 students and employed 82.47 classroom teachers (on a full-time equivalent basis), for a student-to-teacher ratio of 20.73. It is the only high school in the Columbine Articulation Area. Students matriculate to Columbine from Ken Caryl Middle School and five elementary schools. The school's attendance boundary includes the part of the Columbine CDP in Jefferson County, as well as a noncontinuous section to the northwest of Columbine which includes the Southwest Plaza shopping mall and the Governor's Ranch subdivision.

== Extracurricular activities ==
=== Athletics ===
Columbine High School competes in the Jeffco league of the Colorado High School Activities Association (CHSAA). Their team colors are navy and silver, and their mascot is a rebel. The school's athletic department offers 24 sports.

The Columbine Rebels have won 17 state championship titles in seven different sports, including the 1999 Class 5A football championship the year after the massacre. The school's most recent championship was the 2023 Class 5A football championship where they defeated Cherry Creek High School. Major League Baseball pitcher Darrel Akerfelds attended Columbine High School.

== Notable alumni ==
- Darrel Akerfelds – Major League Baseball pitcher playing with the Oakland Athletics, Cleveland Indians, Texas Rangers and Philadelphia Phillies from 1986 through 1991
- Sera Cahoone – singer-songwriter
- Skip Ewing – country songwriter and artist
- Andrew Gentry – college football offensive lineman for the BYU Cougars
- Wes Hart – MLS player who last played for the San Jose Earthquakes
- Allan Kayser – actor who played "Bubba" in the sitcom Mama's Family
- Sue Manteris – newscaster on Las Vegas TV media and channel 3; played CNN reporter Sue Tripathi in Miss Congeniality 2: Armed and Fabulous
- Todd Park Mohr – guitarist and vocalist of Big Head Todd and the Monsters
- Patrick Neville – politician
- Carlos Samour - Associate Justice of the Colorado Supreme Court
- Jeanie Schroder – member of DeVotchKa
- Longmont Potion Castle – comedian and musician known for albums of recorded absurdist prank calls
- Woody Kincaid – American long-distance runner for Bowerman Track Club

=== 1999 massacre ===
==== Perpetrators ====
- Eric Harris and Dylan Klebold

==== Victims ====
- Rachel Scott – the first of the 14 victims killed in the massacre; the youth program Rachel's Challenge was created in her memory
- Cassie Bernall – one of the 14 victims killed in the massacre
- Austin Eubanks – motivational speaker on drug addiction and recovery, and injured survivor of the Columbine High School massacre
- Anne Marie Hochhalter — anti-violence activist who, with her death in 2025, became the massacre's last fatality

== See also ==
- Columbine (book)
- They Call Me Mr. De
