= Cassie Bernall =

Columbine High School massacre victim (1981–1999)

- Bernall in 1997
- Born: Cassie René Bernall; November 6, 1981; Wheat Ridge, Colorado, U.S.
- Died: April 20, 1999 (aged 17); Columbine, Colorado, U.S.
- Cause of death: Gunshot wound (killed by Eric Harris)
- Burial place: Golden Cemetery, Golden, Colorado, U.S.
- Occupation: Student
- Known for: Victim of the Columbine High School massacre

Cassie René Bernall (November 6, 1981 – April 20, 1999) was an American student who was killed in the Columbine High School massacre, where 12 more students and a teacher were killed by Eric Harris and Dylan Klebold, who then committed suicide. It was reported that Bernall had been asked whether or not she believed in God, and she said "Yes", before being shot during the massacre. However, investigators concluded the person who was asked about her belief in God was not Cassie Bernall, but actually Valeen Schnurr, who survived the shooting.

In September 1999, Bernall's mother, Misty, released a memoir titled She Said Yes: The Unlikely Martyrdom of Cassie Bernall. In it, Misty describes her daughter's turbulent teenage life, conversion and Christian faith.

== Life ==
Cassie was born to Misty and Brad Bernall on November 6, 1981, in Wheat Ridge, Colorado. Along with her brother Chris, she was brought up in a Christian home. According to her parents, she rebelled as a young teenager and began using drugs, such as alcohol, and at one point she became suicidal. Her mother found letters in her bedroom discussing her thoughts of killing her parents, and they decided to send her to a new school, Columbine High School, for a new start. A year and a half before her death, Bernall decided to go on a weekend church retreat and restored her faith. Her father said "When she came back from that retreat, she was an entirely different person. We had gotten our daughter back."

== Murder ==
Bernall was killed by Eric Harris during the Columbine massacre on April 20, 1999. According to witness Emily Wyant, who was hiding under the same table as Bernall, Harris slammed his hand twice down on the table above them and said "peek-a-boo" before fatally shooting Bernall in the head. The shotgun blast that killed Bernall ricocheted, resulting in a nose injury to Harris. Her family was unaware of her death until April 22, when they were notified.

== Legacy ==
=== Martyrdom ===
The deaths of Bernall and fellow student and Christian Rachel Scott during the Columbine massacre led both to be subsequently depicted and remembered by groups of evangelical Christians as Christian martyrs. In the following years numerous books—termed "hagiographies" by sociologist Ralph Larkin—were published about Scott and Bernall with the assistance of or authorship by their parents.

=== Controversy surrounding martyrdom claims ===
Craig Scott, the brother of Rachel Scott, was a student also in the library during the massacre who told investigators that he had heard one of the shooters ask a victim whether or not they believed in God during the shooting, and that the victim answered, "Yes." Scott said that he recognized the voice as Bernall's, however, he did not see the exchange happen as he was hiding under the table at the time. Investigators later took Scott back into the library and asked him to point to where he had heard the exchange come from. He did not point to where Bernall had been in the library, but rather pointed to where Schnurr, another student that had been shot in the massacre, had been hiding.

Schnurr had been shot and was on the floor of the library when one of the shooters, Dylan Klebold approached her. She said, "Oh, my God, oh, my God, don't let me die." Klebold asked her if she believed in God. She said yes, and he asked why. She responded, "Because I believe and my parents brought me up that way." Klebold reloaded but did not shoot her again, and Schnurr ultimately survived the massacre. Some media publicized the story of Bernall being asked about her belief in God before her death. The story persisted even decades later. In 2015, Rick Santorum used the scenario during a Republican presidential debate, saying "16 years ago this country was tremendously inspired by a young woman who faced a gunman in Columbine and was challenged about her faith, and refused to deny God." However, Santorum did not attach a name to the story, and may have been referencing Schnurr.

=== She Said Yes: The Unlikely Martyrdom of Cassie Bernall ===
In September 1999, Bernall's mother, Misty Bernall, authored the book She Said Yes: The Unlikely Martyrdom of Cassie Bernall. The book reached No. 8 on The New York Times best-sellers list.

In the book, Misty Bernall repeated the story that her daughter was asked if she believed in God before she died, despite being told by investigators that the question had not been asked. Cassie's friend Emily Wyant, who was next to her in the library when she was shot, also told the family that the question had not been asked. Despite this, the Bernalls issued a statement standing behind the accuracy of their book, saying they had spoken to four witnesses who had told them that she had defended her faith before being killed, with Brad Bernall stating, “We leave it up to the audience” to make up their own mind about what happened.

=== In popular culture ===
Bernall's presentation as a Christian martyr has led to her serving as the inspiration for several songs, including Flyleaf's "Cassie" and Michael W. Smith's "This Is Your Time". The video for "This Is Your Time" includes a short clip at its beginning of Bernall talking about her beliefs.

== See also ==
- A Mother's Reckoning

== Works cited ==
- Larkin, Ralph W. (2007). Comprehending Columbine. Temple University Press. ISBN 978-1-5921-3490-8.
- Pike, Sarah M. (September 2009). "Dark Teens and Born-Again Martyrs: Captivity Narratives after Columbine". Journal of the American Academy of Religion. 77 (3): 647–679. doi:10.1093/jaarel/lfp038. JSTOR 20630144. PMID 20681084.
- Senie, Harriet F. (2016). "The Conflation of Heroes and Victims: A New Memorial Paradigm". A Companion to Public Art (online ed.). John Wiley & Sons, Inc. pp. 107–118. ISBN 9781118475331.
- Watson, J. (2003). The Martyrs of Columbine: Faith and the Politics of Tragedy. Springer. ISBN 9781403970008.
