= Sue Klebold =

American activist, mother of Dylan Klebold (born 1949)

- Born: Susan Frances Yassenoff; March 25, 1949 (age 77); Columbus, Ohio, U.S.
- Education: Ohio State University (BA); Cardinal Stritch College (MEd)
- Occupations: Author; activist
- Years active: 2016–present
- Known for: Mother of American mass murderer, Dylan Klebold
- Notable work: A Mother's Reckoning: Living in the Aftermath of Tragedy
- Spouse: Thomas Klebold (m. 1971; div. 2014)
- Children: 2, including Dylan Klebold

Susan Frances Klebold (née Yassenoff; born March 25, 1949) is an American author and suicide prevention activist. Her son, Dylan Klebold, was one of the perpetrators of the 1999 Columbine High School massacre. Sixteen years after the massacre, she published A Mother's Reckoning, a book in which she reflects on the signs she missed regarding Dylan's mental state and possible motives.

== Early life ==
Susan Frances Yassenoff was born on March 25, 1949, in Columbus, Ohio, to Charlotte (née Haugh; 1921–1987) and Milton Yassenoff (1919–1967). She grew up in Bexley, Ohio, with her older sister and younger brother. Her paternal grandfather, Leo Yassenoff, was a prominent real estate developer and philanthropist in the local Jewish community. As a result of her family's background, Klebold attended a Reform temple in her youth while also going to church with her maternal grandparents.

Klebold began her post-secondary education at Knox College in Galesburg, Illinois. After transferring to Ohio State University in 1969, she met Thomas Klebold; the two married in 1971. In 1975, she earned a master's degree in educational sciences at Cardinal Stritch College in Milwaukee, Wisconsin. Upon settling in Littleton, Colorado, Klebold worked for the Colorado Community College System, where she developed job training grants for people with disabilities and other vulnerable populations.

Klebold gave birth to her first child, a son named Byron, in 1978. In 1981, Klebold had her second son, Dylan.

== Columbine High School massacre ==
On April 20, 1999, Klebold's second son, Dylan, killed 14 people and injured 24 others in the Columbine High School massacre, which he carried out alongside Eric Harris, before committing suicide in the school library.

Following the massacre, Klebold and her husband issued a statement through their attorney expressing condolences to the victims' families. She also wrote personal letters to the families of those killed and to survivors who were injured, conveying similar sentiments.

Klebold initially struggled to accept Dylan's full involvement in the massacre, but later came to terms with it. In an interview with Andrew Solomon, she stated that "seeing those videos was as traumatic as the original event. Everything I had refused to believe was true. Dylan was a willing participant and the massacre was not a spontaneous impulse." Investigators later concluded that Dylan had experienced severe depression and suicidal ideation since at least 1997, although his parents did not learn these details until a year after the killings.

In April 2001, the Klebolds, along with the Harris family, settled a lawsuit with the families of the victims for $1.6 million. Following the settlement, Sue and Tom Klebold met with several of the victims' families. In July 2003, both the Klebold and Harris families testified under oath; their testimonies were originally sealed for 20 years (2027), this was later quietly extended until the year 2116.

On the advice of their attorney, the Klebolds avoided the press for the five years following the massacre, citing fears of misinterpretation and additional death threats. They broke their silence in 2004, speaking to The New York Times and later contributing to Andrew Solomon's book Far From The Tree. In the latter, Sue Klebold was quoted as saying, "I know it would have been better for the world if Dylan had never been born. But I believe it would not have been better for me."

In 2009, Klebold wrote for O, The Oprah Magazine, stating that she had no idea Dylan had been depressed or experiencing suicidal thoughts. Columnist Mike Littwin criticized the essay in a Denver Post opinion piece, noting that Klebold's account, while "eloquent," revealed little about Dylan, his and Harris' victims, or the dynamics of the Klebold family.

== Writing and activism ==
In 2016, Klebold publicly shared her story by publishing A Mother's Reckoning: Living in the Aftermath of Tragedy, against the wishes of her former husband and eldest son. The memoir reached second place on The New York Times best-seller list and grossed $427,200, which was donated to organizations supporting suicide prevention, conflict resolution, and the study of mental disorders.

In February 2016, Klebold granted her first televised interview to Diane Sawyer in an ABC 20/20 special titled Silence Broken: A Mother's Reckoning. She told Sawyer, "I think we like to believe that our love and our understanding is protective, and that 'if anything were wrong with my kids, I would know,' but I didn't know, and I wasn't able to stop [Dylan] from hurting other people. I wasn't able to stop his hurting himself and it's very hard to live with that." She also stated, "If I had recognized that Dylan was experiencing some real mental distress, he would not have been [at Columbine]. He would have gotten help."

Reactions to Klebold's first televised interview were mixed. Patrick Ireland, who was severely injured during the massacre, said that he "prefers to forget the shooters' names and their families." Colorado Attorney General Cynthia Coffman asserted that Klebold's interview could inspire other would-be shooters and labeled Klebold "irresponsible." Conversely, Anne Marie Hochhalter, who was paralyzed in the Columbine attack, expressed sympathy for Klebold and commended her for using proceeds from her book to support mental health organizations. Hochhalter's father also defended Klebold's decision to speak out, calling Coffman's remarks "ignorant" and "insensitive," and describing Klebold as a "remorseful mother" seeking to raise awareness about mental health.

In a second interview with Colorado Public Radio, Klebold discussed her connections with the family of Eric Harris, saying she contacts them "occasionally," and emphasizing that "no one should ever perceive their silence to be indifference" as it is "too difficult to make themselves public." She also stated that she understands her son's murder–suicide in a different way than she did initially, explaining that "coming to understand Dylan's death as a suicide opened the door to a new way of thinking for me about everything he had done," and adding that "whatever else he had intended, Dylan had gone to the school to die." In an interview with The Guardian, Klebold differentiated between her son and Harris, saying that "they had different brain conditions," while also believing "strongly" that the two "were victims of their own pathology."

In 2017, Klebold held a TED Talk discussing her son's involvement in the massacre. As of February 2026, the talk has been viewed more than 26 million times on YouTube and the official TED website.

In July 2021, Klebold appeared on the BBC documentary series Storyville, alongside other American parents whose children had committed school shootings.

== Personal life ==
In February 2001, Klebold was diagnosed with breast cancer, which was in remission as of 2016. She later described herself as experiencing post-traumatic stress disorder and panic attacks.

In 2014, Sue and Tom Klebold divorced after 43 years of marriage, though they have remained close. According to Sue, "There was nothing we had in common. Except the shared tragedy. But we didn't feel the same way about it, we didn't process it the same way."
