= Dave Cullen =

American author

- Born: David Cullen; June 3, 1961 (age 65); Elk Grove Village, Illinois, US
- Education: University of Colorado Boulder(MA); University of Illinois(BS)
- Occupation: Non-fiction writer
- Notable work: Columbine; Parkland; LGBTs in the military
- Website: davecullen.com columbine-guide.com columbine-instructor-guide.com

Dave Cullen is an American Non-fiction writer, freelance Journalist, and Filmmaker.

Cullen is best known for the books Columbine and Parkland: Birth of a Movement, and twenty-six years covering LGBT troops in the military.

Both books were New York Times bestsellers, peaking at #3 and 14, respectively. Both received overwhelmingly positive reviews, were named to prominent best books of the year lists, and Columbine earned several major awards. (See awards section.)

His upcoming book, Don't Fall in Love: The Secret Lives of Two Gay Soldiers Hiding in Plain Sight, began as a 2-part, 11,000-word magazine story on those soldiers, which won the 2000 GLAAD Media Award for best online story of the year. Cullen has been following and interviewing them ever since. The 25-year project is slated for a May 4, 2027 release from HarperCollins.

By the time of the Parkland shooting, TV producers began calling Cullen while mass murders were still in progress. "On Feb. 14, 2018, at 3:13 p.m.—54 minutes after the shooting started at Marjory Stoneman Douglas High School in Parkland, Fla. — Dave Cullen got a text from a producer at "Anderson Cooper 360," asking him to appear on the show that night," the New York Times reported. "At that point, he'd been covering mass killings for so long he had begun suffering from a secondary form of traumatic stress, sometimes 'sobbing all day, mostly in bed, then slumped in a chair.' " The story reported that by the end of the year covering the March for Our Live activists, "He began to heal. 'I had no idea how much sadness was still in me until I saw the 'after' picture from 10 months with them — the happy Dave from pre-Columbine,' he says."

Cullen described some of his writing process to the New York Times. He said he likes to write outside, so he chose apartments within walking distance to Central Park in Manhattan and Prospect Park in Brooklyn. He also opted for a balcony there. "If I need some fresh air and a different headspace, I can walk out to the balcony and pick up a book and read," he said. "I can get some ideas percolating, write them on paper and rush to my computer right inside."

Cullen has begun working on adapting his IP for television. His website states that he retains the rights to all his IP, has completed the WGA Staff Writer Boot Camp, and intends to executive produce with another partner when the time is right. He also executive-produced a short documentary film for Conde Nast Entertainment on Parkland, and served as a consultant on an episode of John Ridley's ABC series American Crime. He is a member of the Writers Guild of America (WGA) and the Author's Guild.

== Print media work ==
Cullen has worked primarily as a freelancer, and appeared in the New York Times, Vanity Fair, The Atlantic, London Times, The New York Times Book Review, Politico Magazine, The Guardian, the Washington Post, The New Republic, Lapham's Quarterly, Newsweek, BuzzFeed, Slate, Salon, The Daily Beast, The Millions, New York Daily News, and WNYC's On The Media.

Cullen's print work has focused heavily on two major subjects:

- Mass murder and gun safety
- LGBT troops in the military, and the military more broadly

He has also done significant work on books and pop culture, such as "The Barbie Way of Knowledge," "Forget Charlie Brown," and "Let's see if they'll play this."

He has covered many facets of LGBT life, including the murder trials of Matthew Shepard, Michael Sam coming out prior to the NFL draft, and Mary Cheney's national coming out. Mary Cheney had been publicly out for years, but it had gone unnoticed in the major media and until Cullen broke the story nationally during the 2000 Republican National Convention, when George Bush Jr. nominated her father Dick Cheney as his running mate. (Cheney then served at years as vice president.)

Mass Murder and Gun Safety:

Cullen's work on mass murder began with the Columbine massacre, where he was one of the first journalists on scene, and spent the next ten years researching and writing Columbine. He continued as a media analyst and essayist on succeeding mass murders, writing about several, including the Pulse nightclub shooting in Orlando, Mass Murder at the Gay Bar: When a Refuge Becomes the Target.

He contributed as an analyst for the Academy for Critical Incident Analysis (ACIA) at John Jay College, where he has participated in three-day intensives on-site with survivors of major tragedies, as well as noted criminologists, mental health experts and other involved. The have included Virginia Tech, the Route 91 Harvest music festival in Las Vegas, and the 2011 Norway attacks that left 77 dead. Cullen now serves on the board of the ACIA.

He gradually broadened his coverage to the gun safety movement for Vanity Fair, the New York Times, The Atlantic, and others. He spent a year covering the March For Our Lives movement, and published Parkland: Birth of a Movement. Cullen also spent a year researching and writing the first major profile of former US Representative Gabby Giffords, (D-AZ) "How Gabby Giffords Survived a Shot to the Head, and Outsmarted the NRA", and contributed the New York Times' guest essay for the tenth anniversary of Sandy Hook, "Republicans Are Breaking With the N.R.A., and It's Because of Us."

LGBTs in the military, and the military more broadly:

Cullen has been covering LGBT military troops continuously since 1999. This has included the long battle over Don't Ask, Don't Tell, "'Betrayal': Transgender Troops React to Trump's Ban, and "So What's it Like To Be a Gay Cadet at West Point These Days." His broader military coverage has included dispatches from Guantanamo Bay, Cuba for The New Republic, "Guantanamo Bay: The 9/11 Trial Has Gone Completely Off the Rails," and "Guantanamo Bay: The Tragicomedy of the 9/11 Trial."

== Books ==
- Columbine, New York: Twelve, 2009. ISBN 9780446546935, OCLC 873747064 Edited by Jonathan Karp.
- Parkland: Birth of a Movement, New York: Harper Collins Publishers, 2019. ISBN 9780062882943, OCLC 1083546196 Edited by Gail Winston.
- Don't Fall in Love: The Secret Lives of Two Gay Soldiers Hiding in Plain Sight will be published by HarperCollins May 4, 2027. Edited by Noah Eaker.

== Don't Fall in Love ==
The publisher's website describes Don't Fall in Love: The Secret Lives of Two Gay Soldiers Hiding in Plain Sight as "An epic work of multi-decade reporting immersed in the lives of two gay soldiers before, during, and after Don't Ask, Don't Tell, from the author of the bestselling contemporary classic, Columbine." The book began in 1999, as a two-part magazine story that led a weeklong series on gays in the military in Salon.com: (Part 2: "A heartbreaking decision.") It was published in June 2000, six years into the policy known as "Don't Ask, Don't Tell," which would last seventeen years.

Cullen's ethnographic story portrayed the behind the scenes lives of two Army captains and one Marine captain, all serving on active duty in Colorado Springs. An author's note explained that the names were changed, as well as some identifying characteristics. Their identities are still unknown. Cullen has said that they will be revealed in Don't Fall in Love.

In the stories, the captains said that life under the policy was nothing like the public perception, and the story laid out their lives in hiding. Because they said their single biggest problem was that for unforeseen reasons, Don' Ask, Don't Tell made it nearly impossible to have a boyfriend, the story was titled, "Don't Ask, Don't Tell, Don't Fall in Love." The book uses the final phrase as its title.

The combined story won the GLAAD Media Award for best online story of the year. Cullen has continued following the two Army officers since 2000, and Don't Fall in Love covers their complete lifespan, from their early years fighting unwanted urges, to their careers before, during and after Don't Ask, Don't Tell.

== Columbine ==
Cullen lived in Denver when Columbine was attacked on April 20, 1999, and on scene within an hour He covered the tragedy periodically for the next several years, primarily as a freelancer for Salon.com, where he published approximately fifty stories. He later covered Columbine and mass murder for Slate, the New York Times, Newsweek, Buzzfeed News and others.

Twenty years after Columbine, Cullen revealed in Parkland that he had suffered two severe depressive episodes covering Columbine, the second and worst episode seven years after the attack. He wrote he had been diagnosed with clinical depression and Vicarious Traumatization (VT), a variation of PTSD.

He wrote that to avoid more severe episodes, he had promised his "shrink" that he would not go back to such a tragedy, and agreed to several additional terms such as not reading victims' stories the first week, and to turn off victim interviews or tributes to the fallen, "unless I promised to hit the mute button if I started to feel the warning signs.

Columbine is in its fourth edition, published in 2024, "The 25 Memorial Edition." It includes a new preface. Earlier editions added an Afterword, Epilogue, scans of the killers' journal, a diagram of the shooting inside the school and environs, a Reader's Guide, and a few corrections to the original edition.

Cullen broke several national stories in the summer after the Columbine attack, including

- the first leaked passages from Eric Harris' journal explaining his motives
- the first interview with Lead Detective Kate Battan laying out the investigations key findings. It was the only interview she gave from the time of the attack until her final report more than a year later.
- the revelation that presumed Christian martyr Cassie Bernall had not "said yes." (Cullen has repeatedly stated publicly that he believes that Cassie's mother, Misty Bernall, who wrote the bestseller She Said Yes, was acting on bad information and made no attempt to deceive.)
- the first extensive interview with Columbine Principal Frank DeAngelis, and the first profile of him.

The FBI granted Cullen exclusive access to the leader of its investigation, clinical psychologist and Supervisory Special Agent Dwayne Fuselier, PhD, widely accepted as having "solved" the case. Cullen spent hundreds of hours interviewing Fuselier over several years, as well as researching the thousands of pages of the killers' writings released and eleven thousand pages of police files. On the fifth anniversary, Cullen broke the story of the FBI's diagnoses of the Columbine killers Eric Harris and Dylan Klebold, and laid out their motives and planning in The Depressive and the Psychopath.

The hundreds of sources Cullen interviewed for the book included Dr. Robert Hare, who created the modern understanding of psychopathy, and the Psychopathy Checklist. The depressive and psychopath diagnoses first put forth in Cullen's piece are now widely accepted, and Columbine is considered the definitive source on the tragedy.

Cullen continued covering and analyzing this ongoing phenomenon for more than the next twenty years. He collaborated with retired FBI profiler Mary Ellen O'Toole on pieces examining other types of mass killers and their motives in "What Does A Killer Think?" and The Injustice Collectors.

Oprah.com, Slate and the author have published excerpts, which are available free online:

- Chapter 1: "Mr. D."
- "God I Want to Torch and Level Everything"
- "Inside Columbine"
- Excerpts from the epilogue

== Parkland ==
Despite his struggles with Vicarious Traumatization and clinical depression, Cullen went down to Parkland to cover the March For Our Lives movement for Vanity Fair right after the mass murder at Marjory Stoneman Douglas High School. His conditions to his editor were that he would only cover the MFOL "uprising," and not the killer, the attack, or even the trauma.

He spent ten months with the MFOL movement, publishing several magazine stories and executive-producing a documentary film, including "Will the Parkland kids change the gun debate?" "Inside The Secret Meme Lab Designed to Propel #NeverAgain beyond the March," "Meet the Ultra-Organized Teenager Masterminding Parkland's Midterms Push," "Seventeen Minutes Is Not Enough: How The Parkland Walkout Erupted Into A Mini-Rebellion" and "'The News Forgets. Very Quickly': Inside the Marjory Stoneman Douglas Students' Incredible Race to Make History," and "The Parkland Ground Game." Parkland: Birth of a Movement was published to mark the first anniversary.

Cullen refused to ever say the Parkland killer's name publicly, including on network news shows, in any of his Vanity Fair coverage, or in the book Parkland.

Cullen continued to cover gun safety as a contributor to Vanity Fair, the New York Times, The Atlantic, and others. He published the first major profile of former US Representative Gabby Giffords, (D-AZ).

== Resources Cullen created for Columbine, and writing and reporting ==
Cullen created several free online resources related to Columbine:

- The Columbine Teacher's Guide
- The Columbine Guide, including scans of the killers' journals, autopsy reports, photos of the guns and bombs they used, crime scene photos, information on the killers parents, resources for victims, and The Basement Tapes, etc.
- The Columbine Student Guide
- A guide to teen depression
- A guide to PTSD
- A guide of how to react "When a Shooting Strikes," including the directive "Run, Hide, Fight."

He also created free online resources for writers and reporters:

- Advice for Writers
- Interviewing:
  - 10 Interview Tips: What Makes Them Tell?
  - Mechanics: My Interview Tips
  - Roles sources can play (and why that matters)

== News analyst ==
Cullen has been a contributor as news analyst to TV networks in the US, and across Europe, Asia, Australia and South America, including CNN, MSNBC, The Today Show, Katie, Nightline, CBS Morning News, CBS Sunday Morning, CBS Now, the three US network evening newscasts (ABC, NBC, and CBS), BookTV, C-Span, and numerous NPR, BBC and Sky News shows.

== Awards and accolades ==
Columbine won several major awards, including the:

- Edgar Award
- Goodreads Choice Award
- Barnes & Noble Discover Award

It made twenty-four Best Nonfiction Books of 2009 list. It was later named to the Los Angeles Times' list of the 30 best nonfiction books of the last 30 years, and Slate's list of the best books of the last quarter century. It has been translated into nine languages. It is widely cited as the definite work on Columbine, been named to a long list of Best True Crime Books of All Time lists.

American School Board Journal named Columbine both The Top Education Book 2009 and one of the Top 10 Education Books of the Decade. It won The Truth About the Fact Award as Best Nonfiction book of 2009, and was a finalist for:

- LA Times Book Prize
- American Library Association's Alex Award
- Audie Award
- Abraham Lincoln High School Book Award
- Mountains & Plains Booksellers Award

Cullen has also been awarded a GLAAD Media Award, Society of Professional Journalism awards, and the Jovanovich Imaginative Writing Award as the best Creative Writing MA thesis at University of Colorado Boulder that year.

== Life ==
Cullen grew up in the Chicago suburb of Elk Grove Village, and graduated from the University of Illinois Urbana-Champaign with a Bachelor of Science in Math and Computer Science.

He began his journalism career writing more than 300 stories for the campus paper The Daily Illini over his four years, as well as serving as an editor, copy editor, slot, and special projects editor. He initially published under the name Dave Cullen, and later as David Cullen. He covered politics the politics beat extensively, including a one-on-one interview with George Bush Sr conducted in the back of his limousine, a week before he was first elected vice president. "That was a very humbling moment, but it was one of the best moments of my life," Cullen told The Daily Illini in 2023. "I was like, 'Oh, I have to get a lot better.'"

He did significant crime reporting, including the notorious embezzlement trial of former University of Illinois official Robert Parker. He also covered pop culture, including early interviews with Adam Clayton of U2, and Charlie Daniels, both in 1982—the latter also a concert review. Cullen told a Champaign, Illinois paper his most memorable night of college was working in The Daily Illini newsroom the night John Lennon was shot. In 1982, Cullen created and edited a new futures section in the paper called "Legacy 2000." In 2023, Cullen was inducted into The Daily Illini Hall of Fame.

Cullen earned a master's degree in Creative Writing from the University of Colorado Boulder, where he studied under Lucia Berlin. She continued as his mentor until her death in 2004. After publication of her posthumous book, A Manual for Cleaning Women, Cullen published a memoir of her wisdom and their time together in Vanity Fair: "11 Years After Her Death, Lucia Berlin Is Finally a Bestselling Author: A former student remembers the "genius" in and outside of the classroom."

Cullen served in the US Army Infantry as a private first class, and then second lieutenant after graduating Officer Candidate School. He dropped out to enlist midway through his senior year. While serving, he broke his back in an accident and returned to University of Illinois two years later in a body cast to complete his undergraduate degree. He began covering the military in 2000.

Cullen remained in Denver until he completed Columbine, which lasted ten years. He has also lived in Dallas, Detroit, Jacksonville, Boulder, Urbana, Washington D.C., New York City, Ft. Benning, Georgia: Kuwait City; Manama, Bahrain; and Blackpool, England. He moved to Hell's Kitchen in Manhattan after Columbine was published. "It was such a fun neighborhood, which is what I came to New York for," he told the New York Times. But eventually it "sucked a lot of energy out of me," he said. "I kind of aged out of the gayborhood there." He left the turbulence for Brooklyn." Cullen later returned to his native Chicago, where he lives today. He has eleven nieces and nephews, and names Bobby Sneakers, a corgi, as his twelfth. Cullen publicly outed himself as gay in 1999.
