= Clement Park =

Park in Jefferson County, Colorado, U.S.

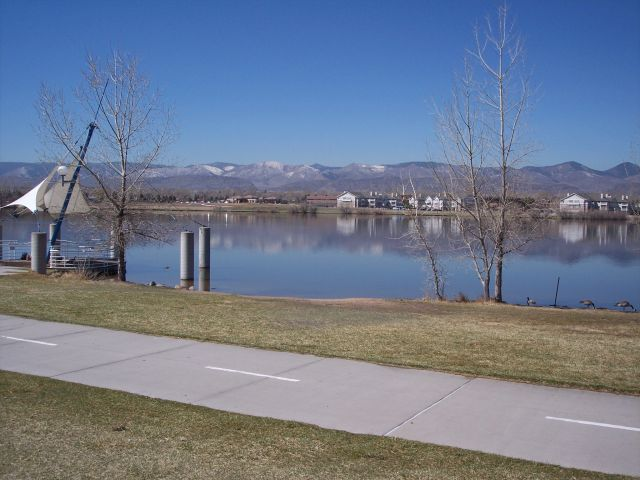
Johnson Reservoir

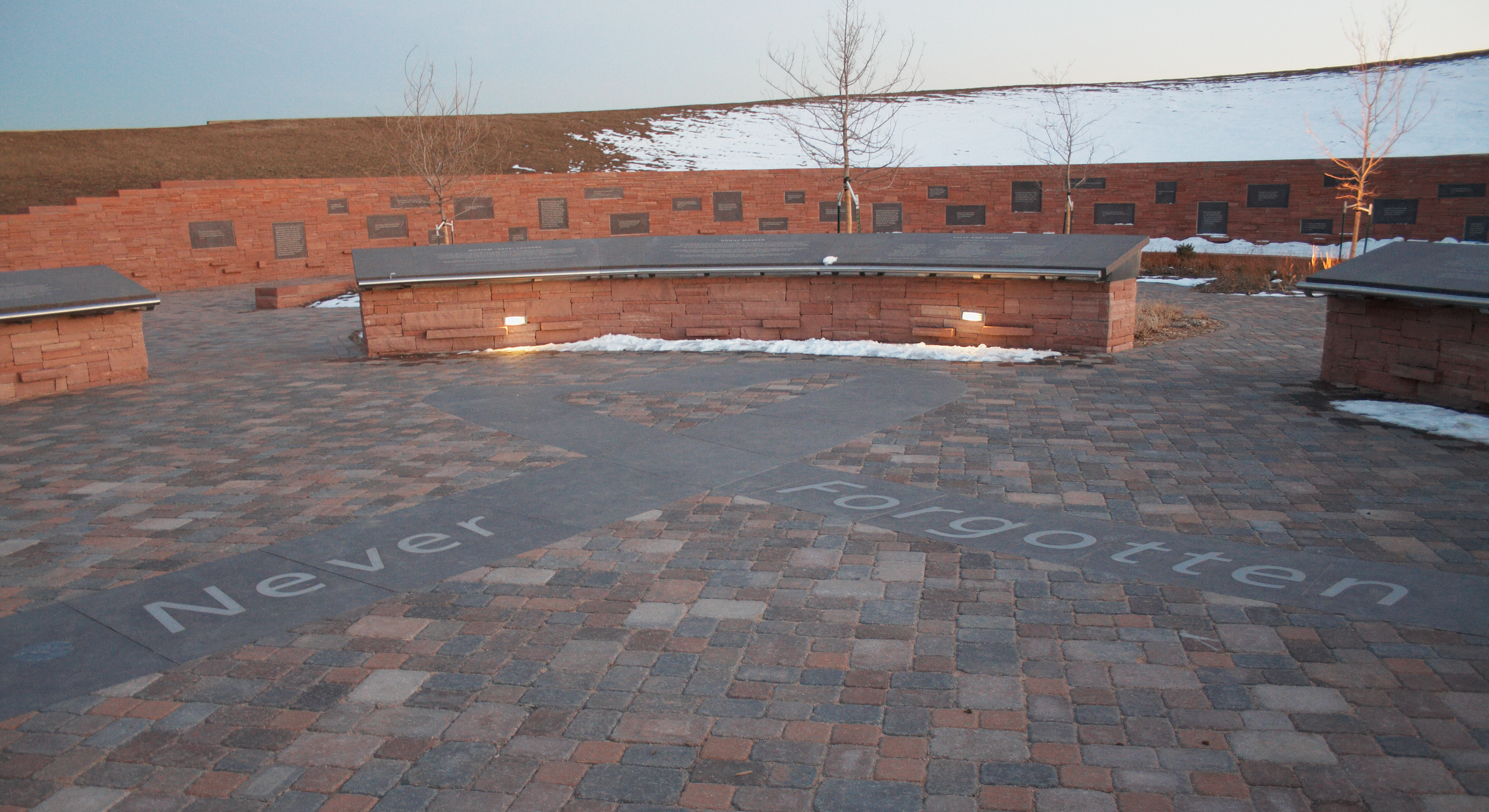
Columbine Memorial

Robert F. Clement Park is located in Columbine, unincorporated Jefferson County, Colorado. It is part of the Foothills Park and Recreation District.

The park contains the Columbine Memorial (dedicated to the victims of the massacre at nearby Columbine High School), the Johnston Reservoir, a skate park, three playgrounds, a concessions stand, tennis courts, horseshoe pits, a basketball court, batting cages, and baseball fields.

Fishing is allowed in the reservoir with a valid fishing license. It is also the site of the annual Summerset Festival in September. This festival is held at the small amphitheater located next to the reservoir. There is also a path that wraps around the entire reservoir.
