= Columbine High School massacre =

1999 mass shooting in Colorado, U.S.

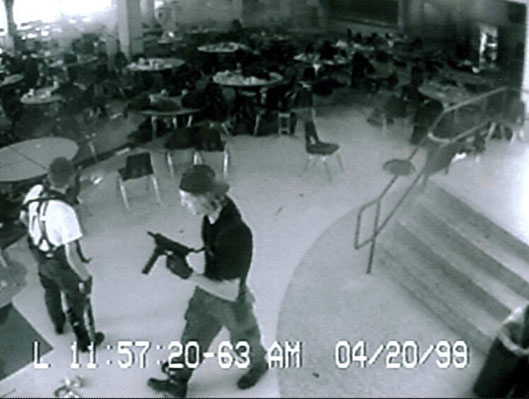
- Harris (left) and Klebold (right) in the cafeteria at 11:57 a.m.
- Location: 39°36′12″N 105°04′29″W; Columbine, Colorado, U.S.
- Date: April 20, 1999; 27 years ago 11:19 a.m. – 12:08 p.m. (MDT; UTC−06:00)
- Target: Students and staff at Columbine High School, first responders
- Attack type: School shooting; mass shooting; mass murder; arson; attempted bombing; shootout; murder–suicide
- Weapons: Harris: 9mm Hi-Point 995 carbine; 12-gauge Savage 67H pump-action shotgun (sawed-off); 2 knives (unused); Klebold: 9mm Intratec TEC-9 Mini pistol; 12-gauge Stevens 311D double-barreled shotgun (sawed-off); 2 knives (unused); Both: 48 CO_{2} cartridge bombs; 27 pipe bombs; 11 1.5-gallon propane bombs; 7 gas or napalm bombs; 4 20-pound propane bombs (including 2 car bombs); 1 25-pound propane bomb; 7 molotov cocktails
- Deaths: 16 (total, including both perpetrators) (Note: Excluding suicides in the later years and the perpetrators, the 14th victim, Anne Marie Hochhalter, died in February 2025 due to sepsis; her death is officially ruled a homicide. She had been left permanently paralyzed because of her shooting injuries and subject to health problems.): Harris: 9; Klebold: 5
- Injuries: 23 (3 indirectly; combined total): Harris: 13; Klebold: 10
- Perpetrator: Eric David Harris; Dylan Bennet Klebold
- Motive: Disputed: According to the FBI: Psychopathy (Harris); Depression (Klebold); Desire for infamy; Other theories: Revenge for bullying; Social rejection; Personal ideology
- Sentence: Manes: 6 years imprisonment Duran: 4 1/2 years imprisonment
- Convicted: Mark Manes and Philip Duran (weapons suppliers)

On April 20, 1999, high school senior students Eric Harris and Dylan Klebold shot and killed 13 students (Note: One of the wounded students, Anne Marie Hochhalter, died of her injuries in 2025) and one teacher in a school shooting and attempted bombing at Columbine High School in Columbine, Colorado, United States. (Note: The school's location is on Pierce Street, which runs north-south through Columbine, roughly 1 mile (1.6 km) west of the Littleton city limit. The United States Postal Service designates "Littleton" as the default place name for addresses in the school's ZIP code; thus, the massacre was widely reported as having happened in the adjacent city of Littleton.) Twenty people were injured by the gunfire, and three others were injured while trying to escape. The attack ended when Harris and Klebold committed suicide. The Columbine massacre was the deadliest mass shooting at a K–12 school in U.S. history until the Sandy Hook Elementary School shooting in December 2012. (Note: Many early reports said the Columbine massacre was the worst school-related massacre in US history. The 1927 Bath School disaster (a bombing) had left 44 dead. The 1966 University of Texas tower shooting was the deadliest school shooting at the time.) It was also the deadliest high school shooting until the Parkland high school shooting in 2018, and remains the deadliest high school shooting west of the Mississippi River. Columbine is considered among the most infamous massacres in the United States, which, as of June 2025, had inspired more than 70 copycat crimes, a phenomenon dubbed the Columbine effect, (Note: The Virginia Tech shooting, the Sandy Hook Elementary School shooting, the Kerch Polytechnic College massacre, the Parkland high school shooting and the Erfurt school massacre are deadlier attacks linked to Columbine in the United States and internationally.) and Columbine has become a byword for modern school shootings.

Harris and Klebold, who planned for roughly a year, intended the attack to be primarily a bombing and only secondarily a shooting. The pair launched a shooting attack after the homemade bombs they planted in the school failed to detonate. Their motive remains uncertain. The police were slow to enter the school and were strongly criticized for not intervening during the shooting. The incident resulted in the introduction of the immediate action rapid deployment (IARD) tactic, which is used in active-shooter situations, and an increased emphasis on school security with zero-tolerance policies. The violence sparked debates over American gun culture and gun control laws, high school cliques, subcultures (e.g. goths), outcasts, and school bullying, as well as teenage use of pharmaceutical antidepressants, the Internet, and violence in video games and film.

Many makeshift memorials were created after the massacre, including ones using victim Rachel Scott's car and John Tomlin's truck. Fifteen crosses for the victims and the shooters were erected on top of a hill in Clement Park. Many people objected to the inclusion of crosses for the perpetrators and these were later removed from the site. Planning for a permanent memorial began in June 1999. The resulting Columbine Memorial opened to the public in September 2007.

== Perpetrators ==
=== Eric Harris ===
Eric David Harris (April 9, 1981 – April 20, 1999) was born in Wichita, Kansas. The Harris family relocated often, as Harris's father, Wayne Harris, was a US Air Force transport pilot. The family moved from Plattsburgh, New York, to Littleton, Colorado, in July 1993, when his father retired from military service. Harris attended Ken Caryl Middle School, where he met Klebold at age 12 or 13. In 1996, the Harris family purchased a house south of Columbine High School (CHS). Harris's older brother attended college at the University of Colorado Boulder.

=== Dylan Klebold ===
Dylan Bennet Klebold (/ˈkliːboʊld/ KLEE-bohld; September 11, 1981 – April 20, 1999) was born in Lakewood, Colorado. His parents were pacifists and attended a Lutheran church with their children. Both Dylan and his older brother attended confirmation classes in accordance with the Lutheran tradition. Klebold was named after poet Dylan Thomas. Klebold attended Normandy Elementary for first and second grade before transferring to Governor's Ranch Elementary, and became part of the Challenging High Intellectual Potential Students (CHIPS) program.

== Background ==
=== Criminal history ===
In 1996, 15-year-old Harris created a private website on America Online (AOL), (Note: Once the website was made public after the massacre, AOL permanently deleted it from its servers.) initially to host video game levels (known as WADs) that he created for the first-person shooter games Doom, Doom II, and Quake. (Note: Some of the Doom levels he created can still be found online, known as the Harris levels.) On the site, Harris began a blog, which included details of mischief and vandalism, such as lighting fireworks with Klebold and others. Harris referred to these acts as "rebel missions" and the blog posts as "mission logs". In early 1997, after classmate Brooks Brown had told Harris's parents where he hid alcohol, to get back at Harris after he had previously thrown a chunk of ice at Brown's car windshield, the blog posts showed signs of Harris's anger against society. By the end of the year, the site contained instructions on how to make explosives (specifically pipe bombs). In August 1997, Harris wrote on the blog "All I want to do is kill and injure as many of you as I can, especially a few people. Like Brooks Brown." After Brown's parents viewed the site, they contacted the Jefferson County Sheriff's Office on August 7, 1997. An investigator drafted an affidavit requesting a search warrant for the Harris household, but it was never submitted to a judge.

On January 30, 1998, Harris and Klebold were arrested for breaking into a white van parked near Littleton and stealing tools and computer equipment. The judge sentenced them to a 12-month juvenile diversion program. As a result, they both attended mandatory classes such as anger management and met with diversion officers. (Note: Klebold had a history of drinking and failed a diluted urine test, but neither he nor Harris attended any substance abuse classes.) They were both released from the program a month early.

=== Writings ===
Shortly after the court hearing for the van break-in, Harris reverted his website back to only hosting user-created levels of Doom and began keeping a journal. Klebold had already been keeping a personal journal since March 1997. In both their journals, Harris and Klebold later plotted the attack. Harris's plan for an attack included possibly escaping to a foreign country or hijacking an aircraft at the Denver International Airport and crashing it into a building in New York City.

Klebold and Harris both made entries in their journals on topics related to sexuality. Klebold expressed shame for his sexual interests, which included bondage and foot fetishism, stating that, "My humanity has a foot fetish, & bondage exteme [sic] liking. I try to thwart it..." Harris described his desire for raping and torturing women in his bedroom, and also expressed interest in cannibalism, stating that he would like to dismember a woman with whom he could have "animalistic sex" and eat her flesh.

Harris and Klebold's schoolwork displayed themes of violence. In December 1997, Harris wrote a paper on school shootings titled "Guns in School", and a poem from the perspective of a bullet. Klebold wrote a short story about a man killing students which worried his teacher so much that she alerted his parents; when Klebold was confronted about it, he said it was "just a story". For one project, Harris wrote a paper on Nazi Germany and Klebold wrote a paper on Charles Manson. In a psychology class, Harris wrote that he dreamed of going on a shooting spree with Klebold, with Harris's journals describing several experimental bomb detonations.

Nearly a year before the massacre, Klebold wrote a message in Harris's 1998 yearbook: "killing enemies, blowing up stuff, killing cops!! My wrath for January's incident will be godlike. Not to mention our revenge in the commons"; "the commons" was slang for the school cafeteria.

=== Tapes ===
Harris and Klebold were both enrolled in video-production classes and kept five video tapes that were recorded with school video equipment. Only two of these, Hitmen for Hire and Rampart Range, and part of a third known as Radioactive Clothing, have been released. (Note: Radioactive Clothing depicts them with fake guns and rigging fake explosives to stop radioactive clothes from taking over the world.) The remaining three tapes, such as the basement tapes, detailed their plans and reasons for the massacre, including the ways they hid their weapons and deceived their parents. Most were filmed in the Harris family basement, and are thus known as the basement tapes. Thirty minutes before the attack, they made a final video saying goodbye and apologizing to their friends and families.

In December 1999, before anyone besides investigators had seen them, Time magazine published an article on these tapes. Select victim families and journalists were allowed to view them, though the tapes were then withheld from the public, and later destroyed in 2011, out of fear of inspiring future massacres. Transcripts of some of the dialogue and a short clip recorded surreptitiously by a victim's father still exist, with the transcripts being online via various resources. The pair claimed they were going to make copies of the tapes to send to news stations but never did so.

When an economics class had Harris make an ad for a business, he and Klebold made a video called Hitmen for Hire on December 8, 1998, which was released in February 2004. It depicts them as part of the Trench Coat Mafia, a clique in the school who wore black trench coats and opposed jocks, extorting money for protecting preps from bullies. Klebold and Harris themselves were apparently not a part of the Trench Coat Mafia but were friends with some of its members and wore trench coats on the day of the massacre. (Note: They did not appear in a group photo of the Trench Coat Mafia in the yearbook. However, Harris's father stated that his son was "a member of what they call the Trench Coat Mafia" in the 9-1-1 call he made on April 20, 1999.) Hitmen for Hire showed them walking the halls of the school, and shooting bullies outside with fake guns. A video was released showing them doing target practice in nearby foothills known as Rampart Range, with the weapons they later used in the massacre.

Harris left a micro cassette labeled Nixon on the kitchen table. On it, Harris said "It is less than nine hours now," placing the recording at some time around 2:30 am. He went on to say "People will die because of me," and "It will be a day that will be remembered forever."

== Weaponry ==
=== Guns ===
In the months prior to the attacks, Harris and Klebold acquired two 9mm firearms and two 12-gauge shotguns. Harris had a Hi-Point 995 carbine with thirteen 10-round magazines and a Savage-Springfield 67H pump shotgun. Klebold used a 9mm Intratec TEC-DC9 semi-automatic handgun with one 50-, one 24-, and two 36-round magazines and a Stevens 311D double-barreled shotgun. Harris's shotgun was sawed-off to around 26 inches (66 cm) and Klebold shortened his shotgun's length to 23 inches (58 cm), a felony under the National Firearms Act. On November 22, 1998, their friend Robyn Anderson purchased a carbine rifle and the two shotguns for the pair at the Tanner Gun show, as they were too young to legally purchase the guns themselves. After the attack, she told investigators that she had believed the pair wanted the weapons for target shooting and denied that she had prior knowledge of their plans. Anderson was not charged. (Note: The Jeffco Final Report explained: "No law, state or federal, prohibits the purchase of a long gun (rifle) from a private individual (non-licensed dealer) [...] If Anderson had purchased the guns from a federally licensed dealer, it would have been considered a 'straw purchase' and considered illegal under federal law.")

Harris and Klebold both held part-time jobs at a local Blackjack Pizza. Through Philip Duran, one of their coworkers, Klebold bought a TEC-9 handgun from Mark Manes for $500 ($966.00 in 2025) at another gun show on January 23. Manes and Duran were both prosecuted after the massacre. Each was charged with supplying a handgun to a minor and possession of a sawed-off shotgun. After both pled guilty, Manes and Duran were sentenced to a total of six years and four-and-a-half years, respectively, in prison.

=== Explosives ===
In addition to the firearms, the complex and highly planned attack involved several improvised explosive devices. Harris and Klebold constructed a total of 99 bombs. These included 27 pipe bombs, 48 carbon-dioxide cartridges filled with gunpowder (called "crickets"), seven Molotov cocktails, and 15 propane tanks converted to bombs, five of which were 20-pounds (nine kg) or more. Two propane bombs were used in the cafeteria, two in the shooters' cars, and in another location intended as a diversion. For ignition, they used storm matches, cannon fuses, and model rocket igniters as well as timing devices built from mechanical alarm clocks for the propane bombs. During the massacre, they carried match strikers taped to their forearms for easy ignition of the pipe bombs and CO_{2} bombs.

Harris also experimented with napalm, and envisioned a kind of backpack and flamethrower. They both attempted to get another friend and coworker, Chris Morris, who was a part of the Trench Coat Mafia, to keep the napalm at his house, but he refused. Harris also tried to recruit him to be a third shooter but played it off as a joke when rebuked.

==== Pipe bombs ====
Harris's website contained instructions on making pipe bombs and Molotovs, and the extensive use of shrapnel. Harris's father once discovered one of his pipe bombs. Harris's journal logged the creation of 25 pipe bombs.

Klebold scared his coworkers by once bringing a pipe bomb into work. They would give various nicknames to their pipe bombs. After the massacre, two pipe bombs had been left in Klebold's bedroom, one named "Vengeance" and another "Atlanta", presumably after the Olympic Park bombing.

==== Cafeteria bombs ====
They had in their possession eight propane tanks all converted into bombs. The weekend before the shooting, Harris and Klebold bought two propane tanks and other supplies from a hardware store. They bought six propane tanks on the morning of the attack. Harris was caught on a gas station security camera at 9:12 a.m. buying a propane tank. Both cafeteria bombs included a single 20-pound (nine kg) tank, attached pipe bombs, and supporting gasoline canisters alongside.

==== Car bombs ====
Both car bombs were made from two 20-pound propane tanks, pipe bombs, and various containers filled with gasoline were spread throughout the vehicles. Eight pipe bombs were placed in Klebold's car, and one in Harris's.

=== Knives ===
Harris and Klebold were both equipped with two knives each, but investigators have concluded that they were not used during the massacre. Harris had a boot knife on his belt and a "Khyber-pass" machete bowie knife taped to the back of his ankle. Both had an "R", referencing Harris's alias "REB", etched into the handle, and the machete had a swastika on the sheath. Klebold had a "Cobra" knife mounted to his belt on the left side as well as a switchblade in his right pocket.

== Massacre ==
According to the shooters' respective journals and video tapes, it is believed by investigators that the pair intended to detonate their propane bombs in the cafeteria at the busiest lunch hour, killing hundreds of students. After this, they would shoot and stab survivors, as well as lob bombs. Bombs set in their cars in the parking lot would also eventually detonate, killing more students as well as any police officers, paramedics, firemen or reporters who had arrived at the school. (Note: Investigators speculated they were supposed to detonate after the massacre and injure first responders.) However, the bombs in the cafeteria and cars failed to detonate.

Several official sources claim they planned to shoot the fleeing survivors from the parking lot, but when the bombs failed, they moved to the staircase on the hill at the west side. Other sources claim the top of the staircase where the massacre began was their preferred spot to wait for the bombs to go off. (Note: Klebold made notes prior to the massacre which included "Go to the outside hill, wait. When first bombs go off, attack.")

A total of 188 rounds of ammunition were fired by the perpetrators during the massacre:

- Harris fired 121 shots in total, nearly twice as much as Klebold. He fired his carbine rifle 96 times: 47 shots outside, 13 shots in the library, and 36 shots in the hallways and cafeteria. Harris also discharged his shotgun 25 times: 21 times in the library and four times elsewhere in the building. He did not fire his shotgun outside the school.
- Klebold fired 67 shots in total. He fired the TEC-9 handgun 55 times: 3 shots outside, 21 shots in the library, and 31 shots elsewhere in the building. Klebold also fired 12 rounds from his double-barreled shotgun: twice outside, 4 times in the hallways, and 6 times in the library.

Law enforcement officers also fired 141 rounds during exchanges of gunfire with the shooters.

=== Planting the bombs ===
On Tuesday morning, April 20, 1999, Harris and Klebold placed two duffel bags in the cafeteria. Each bag contained propane bombs, set to detonate during the "A" lunch shift, which began at 11:15 am. (Note: All times are in Mountain Daylight Time, UTC-6.)

No witness recalled seeing the duffel bags being added to the 400 or so backpacks that were already in the cafeteria. The security staff at CHS did not observe the bags being placed in the cafeteria; a custodian was replacing the school security videotape at around 11:14 am. Shortly after the massacre, police speculated the bombs were placed during this "tape change". They also investigated whether the bombs were placed during the "after-prom" party held the prior weekend. Some Internet users claim the bomb placement can be seen on the surveillance video at around 10:58 am.

Jefferson County Sheriff's Deputy Neil Gardner was assigned to the high school as a full-time school resource officer. Gardner usually ate lunch with students in the cafeteria, but on April 20 he was eating lunch in his patrol car at the northwest corner of the campus, watching students in the Smokers' Pit in Clement Park, a meadow adjacent to the school.

Two backpacks filled with pipe bombs, aerosol canisters, and small propane bombs were also placed in a field about 3 miles (4.8 km) south of CHS, and 2 miles (3.2 km) south of the fire station. (Note: On the corner of South Wadsworth Boulevard and Ken Caryl Avenue.) The bombs were intended as a diversion to draw firefighters and emergency personnel away from the school. Only the pipe bombs and one of the aerosol canisters detonated, causing a small fire, which was quickly extinguished by the fire department. It went off after first having been moved. Bomb technicians immediately examined the bombs and relayed to police at the school the possibility of devices with motion activators.

Harris and Klebold changed clothes and returned separately to CHS. Harris parked his vehicle in the junior student parking lot, and Klebold parked in the adjoining senior student parking lot. The school cafeteria was their primary bomb target; the cafeteria had a long outside window-wall, ground-level doors, and was just north of the senior parking lot. The library was located above the cafeteria in the second-story of the window-wall. Each car contained bombs.

As Harris pulled into the parking lot, he encountered classmate Brooks Brown, with whom he had recently patched up a longstanding series of disputes. According to Brown, who was smoking a cigarette, he was surprised to see Harris, whom he earlier noted had been absent from a class test. Harris, a good student, was unlikely to miss school days with important academic obligation. Brown berated Harris for missing the test. Harris, acting unconcerned, replied "It doesn't matter anymore." Harris went on: "Brooks, I like you now. Get out of here. Go home." Brown, feeling uneasy and already prepared to skip his next class, walked away down South Pierce Street.

Meanwhile, Harris and Klebold armed themselves, using straps and webbing to conceal weapons beneath their trench coats. They lugged bags containing bombs and ammunition. Harris had concealed his shotgun in one of the bags. Beneath the trench coats, Harris wore a military bandolier and a white T-shirt with the inscription "Natural selection" in black letters, a mantra he had adopted; Klebold wore a black T-shirt with "Wrath" in red letters.

The cafeteria bombs failed to detonate. Had these explosives detonated as intended, they would have killed or severely wounded the 488 students in the cafeteria and damaged the school's structure, collapsing the library into the cafeteria and possibly killing more students and staff.

=== 11:19 am: Shooting begins ===
At 11:19 am, 17-year-old Rachel Scott and her friend Richard Castaldo were having lunch and sitting on the grass next to the west entrance of the school. Klebold threw a pipe bomb towards the parking lot; the bomb only partially detonated, causing it to give off smoke. Likewise, several students during the incident first thought that they were watching a prank.

Harris shot Scott four times with a Hi-Point 995 from a distance of 10 to 15 feet (3.0 to 4.6 m), she sustained a fourth and fatal wound to her left temple. Castaldo was shot eight times in the chest, arm, and abdomen by both Harris and Klebold; he fell unconscious to the ground and was left paralyzed below the chest. Castaldo survived, but Scott immediately died from her injuries.

After firing twice, Klebold's TEC-9 jammed, and he was forced to temporarily cease shooting to fix it, which he did by reloading a new magazine into his pistol. Meanwhile, Harris took off his trenchcoat and aimed his carbine down the west staircase in the direction of three students: Daniel Rohrbough, Sean Graves, and Lance Kirklin. The students presumed they were paintball guns, and were about to walk up the staircase directly below the shooters. Harris fired ten times, killing Rohrbough, and injuring Graves and Kirklin.

Harris turned west and fired seven shots in the direction of five students sitting on the grassy hillside adjacent to the steps and opposite the west entrance of the school: Michael Johnson was hit in the face, leg, and arm but ran and escaped; Mark Taylor was shot in the chest, arms, and leg and fell to the ground, where he faked death; the other three escaped uninjured.

Klebold fired down the stairs with his shotgun, injuring Nicholas Foss with a graze wound, then walked down the steps toward the cafeteria. He came up to Lance Kirklin, who was already wounded and lying on the ground, weakly calling for help. Klebold said, "Sure. I'll help you," then shot Kirklin in the jaw with his shotgun. Although near-fatally injured, Kirklin ultimately survived. Graves—paralyzed beneath the waist—had crawled into the doorway of the cafeteria's west entrance and collapsed. He rubbed his blood on his face and played dead. After shooting Kirklin, Klebold walked towards the cafeteria door. He then stepped over the injured Graves to enter the cafeteria. Graves remembers Klebold saying, "Sorry, dude."

Klebold then only briefly entered the cafeteria and did not shoot at the several people still inside. Officials speculated that Klebold went to check on the propane bombs. Harris was still at the top of the stairs shooting, and severely wounded and partially paralyzed 17-year-old Anne Marie Hochhalter as she attempted to flee. (Note: Hochhalter died of her injuries on February 16, 2025, at the age of 43. Her death certificate lists her cause of death as sepsis due to Streptococcus pyogenes. Her death was officially ruled a homicide.)

Klebold came out of the cafeteria and went back up the stairs to join Harris. They each shot at students standing close to a soccer field but did not hit anyone. They walked toward the west entrance, throwing pipe bombs in several directions, including onto the roof; only a few of these pipe bombs detonated. Witnesses heard one of them say, "This is what we always wanted to do. This is awesome!"

Meanwhile, art teacher Patti Nielson was inside the school; she had noticed the commotion and walked toward the west entrance with student Brian Anderson. Nielson had intended to walk outside to tell the two students, "Knock it off", thinking they were either filming a video or pulling a student prank. As Anderson opened the first set of double doors, the gunmen shot out the windows, injuring him with flying glass; Nielson was hit in the shoulder with shrapnel. Anderson and Nielson ran back down the hall into the library, and Nielson alerted the students inside to the danger, telling them to get under desks and keep silent. She dialed 9-1-1 and hid under the library's administrative counter. Anderson fell to the floor, bleeding from his injuries, then hid inside the magazine room adjacent to the library.

=== 11:22 am: Police response and West Entrance shootouts ===
At 11:22 am, a custodian called Deputy Neil Gardner, the assigned resource officer to Columbine, requesting assistance in the senior parking lot on the school radio. The only paved route took him around the school to the east and south on Pierce Street, where at 11:23 am, he heard on his police radio that a female was down, and assumed she had been struck by a car. While exiting his patrol car in the senior lot, he heard another call on the school radio, "Neil, there's a shooter in the school."

Harris, at the west entrance, immediately turned and fired ten shots from his carbine at Gardner, who was 60 yards (55 m) away. As Harris reloaded his carbine, Gardner leaned over the top of his car and fired four rounds at Harris from his service pistol. Harris ducked back behind the building, and Gardner momentarily believed that he had hit him. Harris then reemerged and fired at least four more rounds at Gardner (which missed and struck two parked cars), before retreating into the building. No one was hit during the exchange of gunfire. (Note: Gardner was not wearing his prescription eyeglasses.) Gardner reported on his police radio, "Shots in the building. I need someone in the south lot with me." By this point, Harris had shot 47 times, and Klebold five. The shooters then entered the school through the west entrance, moving along the main north hallway, throwing pipe bombs and shooting at anyone they encountered. Klebold shot Stephanie Munson in the ankle, but she was able to walk out of the school. The pair then shot out the windows to the east entrance of the school. After proceeding through the hall several times and shooting toward—and missing—any students they saw, they went toward the west entrance and turned into the library hallway.

Deputies Paul Smoker and Paul Magor, motorcycle patrolmen for the Jefferson County Sheriff's Office, were writing a traffic ticket north of the school when the "female down" call came in at 11:23 am. Taking the shortest route, they drove their motorcycles over grass between the athletic fields and headed toward the west entrance. When they saw Deputies Scott Taborsky, Rick Searle, and Kevin Walker following them in their patrol car, they abandoned their motorcycles for the safety of the car. The six deputies had begun to rescue two wounded students near the ball fields when another gunfight broke out at 11:26, as Harris returned to the double doors and again began shooting at Deputy Gardner, who returned fire. From the hilltop, Deputy Smoker fired three rounds from his pistol at Harris, who again retreated into the building. As before, no one was hit.

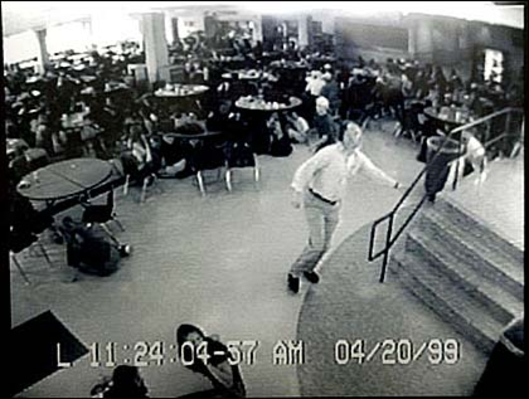
Sanders guiding more than 100 students out of the cafeteria.

Inside the school cafeteria, Dave Sanders and two custodians, Jon Curtis and Jay Gallatine, heard the gunfire and initially told students to get under the tables, then evacuated students up the staircase leading to the second floor of the school. The stairs were located around the corner from the library hallway in the main south hallway. Sanders then tried to secure as much of the school as he could. Sanders and another student were at the end of the hallway, where he gestured for students in the library to stay, before encountering Harris and Klebold, who were approaching from the corner of the north hallway. Sanders and the student turned and ran in the opposite direction. Harris and Klebold shot at them both, with Harris hitting Sanders twice in the back and neck, hitting his teeth on exit, but missing the student. The latter ran into a science classroom and warned everyone to hide. Klebold walked over towards Sanders, who had collapsed, and tossed a pipe bomb, then returned to Harris up the library hallway.

Sanders struggled toward the science area, and teacher Rich Long took him into a classroom where 30 students were located. Due to his knowledge of first aid, student Aaron Hancey was brought to the classroom from another by teacher Kent Friesen despite the unfolding commotion. With the assistance of fellow student Kevin Starkey and teacher Theresa Miller, Hancey administered first aid to Sanders for three hours, attempting to stem the blood loss using shirts from students in the room, and showing him pictures from his wallet to keep him talking. Using a phone in the room, Miller and several students maintained contact with police outside the school.

As the shooting unfolded, pipe bombs were tossed in the hallways and down into the cafeteria. Patti Nielson in the library called 911, telling her story and urging students in the library to take cover beneath desks. According to transcripts, her call was received by a 911 operator at 11:25:18 am.

=== 11:29–11:36 am: Library massacre ===
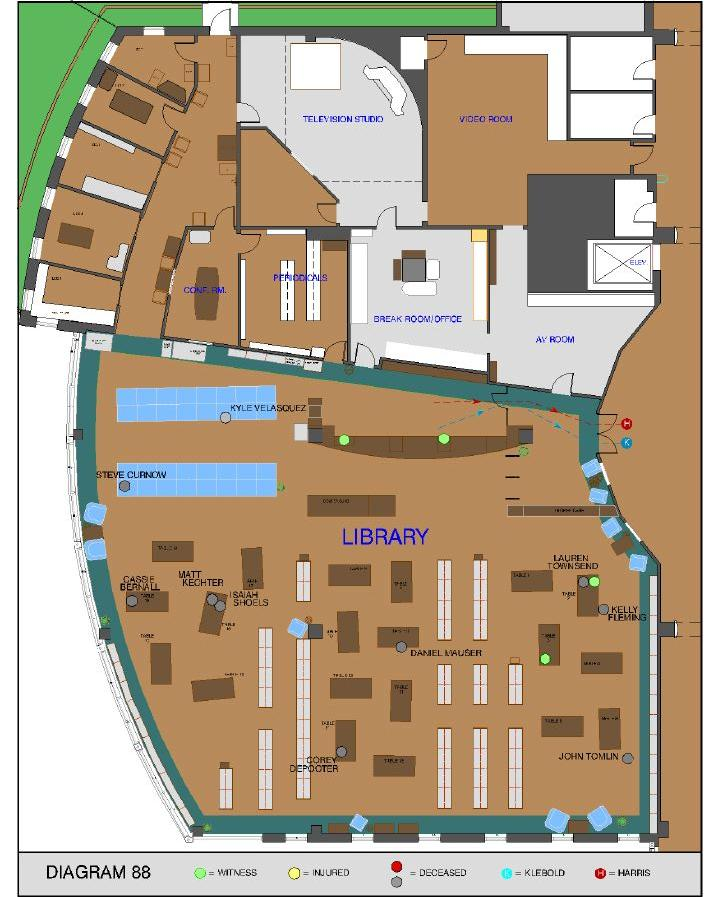
An FBI diagram of the library, with locations of fatalities. Harris' and Klebold's bodies were found in the bottom left corner.

At 11:29 am, Harris and Klebold entered the library. 52 students, two teachers and two librarians were inside. Immediately after entering the library, the shooters loudly ordered everybody to get up, where it was heard on Nielson's 911 call by dispatchers. While ordering the jocks to stand up, one of the two reportedly said, "Anybody with a white hat or a sports emblem on it is dead." Wearing a white baseball cap at Columbine was a tradition among sports team members. Nobody stood up, and several students tried to hide their white hats. Later, throughout the massacre, the shooters were heard to exclaim how long they had waited to commit their actions and seemed to be enjoying themselves as well, shouting things like "Woo!" after shooting.

Harris fired his shotgun twice at a desk. 15-year-old student Evan Todd had been standing near a pillar when the shooters entered the library and had just taken cover behind a photocopier. Todd was hit by wood splinters in the face and lower back but was not seriously injured. He then hid behind the administrative counter.

The gunmen walked into the library, towards the two rows of computers. Sitting at the north row was disabled student Kyle Velasquez, who did not conceal himself in time. Klebold fired his shotgun, fatally hitting him in the head and back. They then put down their ammunition-filled duffel bags at the south—or lower—row of computers and reloaded their weapons. They then walked between the computer rows, toward the windows facing the outside staircase.

The gunmen both shot out the library windows in the direction of the recently arrived police. Officers returned fire, and the gunmen retreated from the windows; no one was injured. Klebold removed his trench coat. He then fired his shotgun at a nearby table, injuring three students: Patrick Ireland, Daniel Steepleton, and Makai Hall.

Simultaneously, Harris walked toward the lower row of computer desks with his shotgun and fired a single shot under the first desk. He hit 14-year-old Steven Curnow with a mortal wound to the neck. He then moved to the adjacent computer desk, injuring 17-year-old Kacey Ruegsegger with a shot which passed completely through her right shoulder, also grazing her neck and severing a major artery. When she started gasping in pain, Harris said, "Quit your bitching." Harris then walked to a table south of the lower computer table, with two students underneath: Cassie Bernall and Emily Wyant. Harris slapped the surface of the table twice as he knelt, and said "Peek-a-boo" before shooting Bernall once in the head with the shotgun, killing her. Harris at this point held the gun with one hand, and the weapon hit his face in recoil, injuring his nose. He told Klebold he had done so, and Klebold responded "Why'd you do that?"

After fatally shooting Bernall, Harris turned toward the next table, where Bree Pasquale sat next to the table rather than under it due to lack of space. Harris's nose was bleeding; witnesses later reported that he had blood around his mouth. Harris asked Pasquale if she wanted to die, and she responded with a plea for her life. Harris laughed and responded "Everyone's gonna die." When Klebold said "shoot her," Harris responded "No, we're gonna blow up the school anyway."

Klebold noticed Ireland trying to provide aid to Hall, who had suffered a wound to his knee. As Ireland tried to help Hall, his head rose above the table. Klebold shot him a second time, hitting him twice in the head and once in the foot. Ireland was knocked unconscious but survived. Klebold then walked toward another table, where he discovered 18-year-old Isaiah Shoels, 16-year-old Matthew Kechter, and 16-year-old Craig Scott (Rachel's younger brother), hiding underneath. Klebold called out to Harris that he found a "nigger" and tried to pull Shoels out from under the table.

Harris left Pasquale and joined him. According to witnesses, they taunted Shoels for a few seconds, making derogatory racial comments. The gunmen both fired their shotguns under the table; Harris shot Shoels in the chest, killing him, while Klebold shot and killed Kechter. Though Shoels was not shot in the head, Klebold reportedly said: "I didn't know black brains could fly that far." Meanwhile, Scott was uninjured, lying in the blood of his friends, feigning death. Harris then yelled, "Who's ready to die next?!" He turned and threw a "cricket" at the table where Hall, Steepleton, and Ireland were. It landed on Steepleton's thigh; Hall quickly noticed it and tossed it behind them, and it exploded in mid-air. Harris walked toward the bookcases between the west and center section of tables in the library. He jumped on one and shook it, apparently attempting to topple it, then shot at the books which had fallen.

Klebold walked to the east area of the library. Harris walked from the bookcases, past the central area to meet Klebold. The latter shot at a display case next to the door, then turned and shot toward the closest table, hitting and injuring 17-year-old Mark Kintgen in the head and shoulder with shotgun pellets. He then turned toward the table to his left and fired, injuring 18-year-olds Lisa Kreutz, Lauren Townsend, and Valeen Schnurr with the same shotgun blast. Klebold then moved toward the same table and fired several more shots with the TEC-9, killing Townsend. At this point, the seriously injured Valeen Schnurr began screaming, "Oh, my God! Oh, my God!" In response, Klebold asked Schnurr if she believed in the existence of God; when Schnurr replied she did, Klebold asked "Why?" and commented "God is gay." Klebold reloaded his weapons and walked away from the table.

Harris approached another table where two girls were hiding. He bent down to look at them and dismissed them as "pathetic". Harris then moved to another table where he fired once, injuring 16-year-olds Nicole Nowlen and John Tomlin with the same shotgun blast. Tomlin moved out from under the table. Klebold approached and shot Tomlin in the head repeatedly, killing him. Harris then walked back over to the other side of the table where Townsend lay dead. Behind the table was 16-year-old Kelly Fleming. Harris shot Fleming with his shotgun, hitting her in the back and killing her. He shot at the table behind Fleming, hitting Townsend, who was already dead; Kreutz again; and wounding 18-year-old Jeanna Park.

The shooters moved to the center of the library, where they reloaded their weapons at a table. Harris then pointed his carbine under a table, but the student he was aiming at moved out of the way. Harris turned his gun back on the student and told him to identify himself. It was John Savage, an acquaintance of Klebold's. He asked Klebold what they were doing, to which he shrugged and answered, "Oh, just killing people." Savage asked if they were going to kill him. Because of the background noise, Klebold said, "What?" Savage asked again whether they were going to kill him. Klebold said no, and told him to run. Savage fled, escaping through the library's main entrance and through the cafeteria.

After Savage left, Harris turned and fired his carbine at the table directly north of where he had been, hitting the ear and hand of 15-year-old Daniel Mauser. Mauser retaliated by either shoving a chair at Harris or grabbing at his leg; Harris fired again and hit Mauser in the center of the face at close range, killing him. Harris then moved south and fired three shots under another table, injuring three 17-year-olds, Jennifer Doyle, Corey DePooter, and Austin Eubanks. Klebold then shot once, fatally striking Corey DePooter at 11:35. There were no further victims. Harris and Klebold had killed 10 people in the library and wounded 12. (Note: There were 56 potential victims in the library; investigators would later find that the shooters had enough ammunition to have killed them all.)

At this point, Klebold was quoted as saying they might start knifing people, but they never did. They headed towards the library's main counter. Harris threw a Molotov cocktail toward the southwestern end of the library, but it failed to explode. They converged close to where Todd had moved after having been wounded. Klebold pulled the chair out from the desk, then he pointed his TEC-9 at Todd, who was wearing a white hat. Klebold asked if he was a jock, and when Todd said no, Klebold responded "Well, that's good. We don't like jocks." Klebold then demanded to see his face; Todd partly lifted his hat so his face would remain obscured. When Klebold asked Todd to give him one reason why he should not kill him, Todd said: "I don't want trouble." Klebold responded back angrily "Trouble? You don't even know what fucking trouble is!" Todd tried to correct himself: "That's not what I meant! I mean, I don't have a problem with you guys. I never will and I never did." Klebold then told Harris he was going to let Todd live, but that Harris could kill him if he wanted.

Harris appeared to pay no attention and stated that he and Klebold should head to the cafeteria. Klebold fired into an open library staff break room, hitting a small television. While Harris was walking away, Klebold said, "One more thing!", then picked up the chair beside the library counter under which Patti Nielson was hiding, and slammed the chair down on top of the computer terminal and library counter. Klebold joined Harris at the library entrance. The two walked out of the library at 11:36. Cautiously, fearing the shooters' return, 10 injured and 29 uninjured survivors began to evacuate the library through the north emergency exit door, which led to the sidewalk next to the west entrance. Kacey Ruegsegger was evacuated from the library by Craig Scott. Had she not been evacuated at this point, Ruegsegger would likely have bled to death from her injuries. Patrick Ireland, unconscious, and Lisa Kreutz, unable to move, remained in the building. Patti Nielson crawled into the exterior break room, into which Klebold had earlier fired shots, and hid in a cupboard.

=== 12:08 pm: Suicides ===
A diagram of the library shortly after Harris and Klebold's suicides (Victims marked in yellow, Harris and Klebold marked in gray)

After leaving the library, Harris and Klebold entered the science area, where they caused a fire in an empty storage closet. It was extinguished by a teacher who had hidden in an adjacent room. The gunmen then proceeded toward the south hallway, where they shot into an empty science room. At 11:44 am, they were captured on the school security cameras as they re-entered the cafeteria. The recording shows Harris crouching against the rail on the staircase and firing toward the propane bombs left in the cafeteria, in an unsuccessful attempt to detonate them. As Klebold approached the propane bomb and examined it, Harris took a drink from one of the cups left behind. Klebold lit a Molotov cocktail and threw it at the propane bomb. About a minute later, the gallon of fuel attached to the bomb ignited, causing a fire that was extinguished by the fire sprinklers a few minutes later. They left the cafeteria at 11:46.

After leaving the cafeteria, they returned to the main north and south hallways of the school and fired several shots into walls and ceilings as students and teachers hid in rooms. They walked through the south hallway into the main office before returning to the north hallway. At 11:56, they returned to the cafeteria, and briefly entered the school kitchen. They returned up the staircase and into the south hallway at 12:00 pm.

They re-entered the library, which was empty of survivors except for the unconscious Ireland and the injured Kreutz. Once inside, at 12:02 pm, police were shot at again through the library windows and returned fire. Nobody was injured in the exchange. By 12:05, all gunfire from the school had ceased. By 12:08 pm, both gunmen had killed themselves. Harris sat down with his back to a bookshelf and fired his shotgun through the roof of his mouth; Klebold went down on his knees and shot himself in the left temple with his TEC-9. An article by The Rocky Mountain News stated that Patti Nielson overheard them shout "One! Two! Three!" in unison, just before a loud boom. Nielson later said that she had never spoken with either of the writers of the article.

In 2002, the National Enquirer published two post-mortem photos of Harris and Klebold in the library. Klebold's gun was underneath his body and so unseen in the photo, leading to speculation that Harris shot Klebold before killing himself. However, some of Klebold's blood was on Harris's legs, suggesting that he had fallen onto Harris after Harris had already killed himself. Also, just before shooting himself, Klebold lit a Molotov cocktail on a nearby table, underneath which Patrick Ireland was lying, which caused the tabletop to momentarily catch fire. Underneath the scorched film of material was a piece of Harris's brain matter, suggesting Harris had shot himself by this point.

Fatalities

1. Rachel Scott (aged 17), killed on grass outside west entrance by Harris
2. Daniel Rohrbough (aged 15), killed at bottom of stairs leading to west entrance by Harris
3. Anne Marie Hochhalter (then aged 17), shot and injured outside the school by Harris; died of sepsis related to her injuries in February 2025 at age 43. Her death was officially ruled a homicide.
4. William David Sanders (aged 47), shot in hallway adjacent library by Harris; died of blood loss in a science classroom
5. Kyle Velasquez (aged 16), killed while sitting in a chair near the middle of the north computer table in the library by Klebold
6. Steven Curnow (aged 14), killed at the west end of the south computer table in the library by Harris
7. Cassie Bernall (aged 17), killed under library table No. 19 by Harris
8. Isaiah Shoels (aged 18), killed under library table No. 16 by Harris
9. Matthew Kechter (aged 16), killed under library table No. 16 by Klebold
10. Lauren Townsend (aged 18), killed under library table No. 2 by Klebold
11. John Tomlin (aged 16), killed next to library table No. 6 by Klebold; after being wounded by Harris
12. Kelly Fleming (aged 16), killed next to library table No. 2 by Harris
13. Daniel Mauser (aged 15), killed under library table No. 9 by Harris
14. Corey DePooter (aged 17), killed under library table No. 14 by Klebold
15. Eric Harris (perpetrator) (aged 18), committed suicide via a self-inflicted gunshot wound
16. Dylan Klebold (perpetrator) (aged 17), committed suicide via a self-inflicted gunshot wound

The final death count was 16, including 11 males, and 5 females. Their ages ranged from 14 to 47, the youngest being Steven Curnow, and the oldest being teacher Dave Sanders. The oldest student killed is Isaiah Shoels.

== Crisis ends ==
=== SWAT response ===
A survivor recalls the events of the day

By 12:00 pm, SWAT teams were stationed outside the school, and ambulances started taking the wounded to local hospitals. A call for additional ammunition for police officers in case of a shootout came at 12:20. Authorities reported pipe bombs by 1:00, and two SWAT teams entered the school at 1:09, moving from classroom to classroom, discovering hidden students and faculty. They entered at the end of the school opposite the library, hampered by old maps and unaware a new wing had recently been added. They were also hampered by the sound of the fire alarms.

=== Leawood Elementary ===
Meanwhile, families of students and staff were asked to gather at nearby Leawood Elementary School to await information. All students, teachers, and school employees were taken away, questioned, and offered medical care in small holding areas before being bussed to meet with their family members at Leawood Elementary. In his book Walking in Daniel's Shoes, Tom Mauser, father of victim Daniel Mauser, recounts how several families who had still been waiting on word of the status of their children were informed by law enforcement that another bus from the school was on its way. However, this bus never arrived, and whether the comments from police stemmed from miscommunication or were an attempt to give distraught parents hope is unknown.

=== The boy in the window ===
Still image of Ireland shortly before he falls from the library window

Patrick Ireland had regained and lost consciousness several times after being shot by Klebold. Paralyzed on his right side, he crawled to the library windows where, on live television, at 2:38 pm, he stretched out the window, intending to fall into the arms of two SWAT team members standing on the roof of an emergency vehicle, but instead falling directly onto the vehicle's roof in a pool of blood. He became known as "the boy in the window." The team members, Donn Kraemer and John Ramoniec, were later criticized for allowing Ireland to drop more than seven feet to the ground while doing nothing to try to ensure he could be lowered to the ground safely or break his fall.

=== "1 bleeding to death" ===
At 2:15 pm, student Mike Rotole placed a sign in the window, reading "1 bleeding to death", to alert police and medical personnel of Dave Sanders's location in the science room. Police initially feared it was a ruse by the shooters. A shirt was also tied to the doorknob. At 2:30, this was spotted, and by 2:47, SWAT officers evacuated the room of students and called for a paramedic. Hancey and Starkey were reluctant to leave Sanders behind. By 3:00, the SWAT officers had moved Sanders to a storage room, which was more easily accessible. As they did so, a paramedic arrived and found Sanders had no pulse. He had died of his injuries in the storage room before he could receive medical care. He was the only teacher to die in the shooting.

President Bill Clinton's remarks regarding the shooting on April 20, 1999

=== Suicide mission; estimated 25 dead ===
Lisa Kreutz, shot in the shoulder, arms, hand, and thigh, was evacuated at 3:22 pm, along with Patti Nielson, Brian Anderson, and the three library staff who had hidden in the rooms adjacent to the library. Kreutz was the last person to be pulled from the library. Officials finished clearing the library by 3:36. By 4:00, Sheriff John P. Stone made an initial estimate of 25 dead students and teachers, 50 wounded, and referred to the massacre as a "suicide mission". President Bill Clinton later issued a statement.

=== Bomb squad response ===
Stone said that police officers were searching the bodies of the gunmen. They feared they had used their pipe bombs to booby-trap corpses, including their own. At 4:30 pm, the school was declared safe. At 5:30, additional officers were called in, as more explosives were found in the parking lot and on the roof. By 6:15, officials had found a bomb in Klebold's car in the parking lot, set to detonate the gas tank.

At 10:40 pm, a member of the bomb squad, who was attempting to dispose of an un-detonated pipe bomb, accidentally lit a striking match attached to the bomb by brushing it against the wall of the ordnance disposal trailer. The bomb detonated inside the trailer but no one was injured.

The bomb squad disarmed the car bomb. Klebold's car was repaired, and later was put up for auction in 2006.

== Immediate aftermath ==
Clinton's remarks to the Columbine High School community on May 20, 1999

On the morning of April 21, bomb squads combed the high school. By 8:30 am, the official death toll of 15 was released. The earlier estimate was ten over the true death toll count, but close to the total count of wounded students. The total count of deaths was 12 students (14 including the shooters) and one teacher; 20 students and one teacher were injured as a result of the shootings. Three more victims were injured indirectly as they tried to escape the school. Anne Marie Hochhalter, who was one of the survivors, died from her injuries in 2025, bringing the number of victim fatalities to fourteen.

At 10:00 am, the bomb squad declared the building safe for officials to enter. By 11:30 am, a spokesman of the sheriff declared the investigation underway. Thirteen of the bodies were still inside and around the high school as investigators photographed the building.

At 2:30 pm, a press conference was held by Jefferson County District attorney David Thomas and Sheriff John Stone, at which they said that they suspected others had helped plan the shooting. Formal identification of the dead had not yet taken place, but families of the children thought to have been killed had been notified.

Throughout the late afternoon and early evening, the bodies were gradually removed from the school and taken to the Jefferson County Coroner's Office to be identified and autopsied. By 5:00 pm, the names of many of the dead were known. An official statement was released, naming the 15 confirmed deaths and 27 injuries related to the massacre.

The cafeteria bombs were discovered on April 22.

In the wake of the massacre, the National Hockey League postponed the start of the first round playoff series between the Colorado Avalanche and the San Jose Sharks.

In the days following the shootings, Rachel Scott's car and John Tomlin's truck became memorials, and impromptu memorials were held in Clement Park. On April 30, carpenter Greg Zanis erected fifteen 6-foot-tall wooden crosses to honor those who had died at the school. Daniel Rohrbough's father cut down the two meant for the gunmen. There were also fifteen trees planted, and he cut down two of those as well.

In November 2021, a report was leaked to NPR about that year's National Rifle Association convention in Denver. In a series of audio tapes, Wayne LaPierre and other top officials suggested raising one million dollars for the victims' families, and the cancellation of the convention was considered by some within the organization.

=== Search warrant press conference ===
Also on April 30, high-ranking officials of Jefferson County and the Jefferson County Sheriff's Office met to decide if they should reveal that Michael Guerra had drafted an affidavit for a search warrant of Harris's residence more than a year before the shootings, based on his previous investigation of Harris's website and activities. Since the affidavit's contents lacked the necessary probable cause, they decided not to disclose this information at a press conference held on April 30, nor did they mention it in any other way.

Over the next two years, Guerra's original draft and investigative file documents were lost. In September 1999, a Jefferson County investigator failed to find the documents during a secret search of the county's computer system. A second attempt in late 2000 found copies of the document within the Jefferson County archives. Their loss was termed "troubling" by a grand jury convened after the file's existence was reported in April 2001. It was concealed by the Jefferson County Sheriff's Office and not revealed until September 2001, resulting from an investigation by the TV show 60 Minutes. The documents were reconstructed and released to the public, but the original documents are still missing. The final grand jury investigation was released in September 2004.

=== Christian martyrdom ===
In the wake of the shooting, victims Rachel Scott and Cassie Bernall came to be regarded as Christian martyrs by Evangelical Christians. The closest living witness to Scott's death, Richard Castaldo, has stated Harris asked Scott if she believed in God, and murdered her after she answered "You know I do", but this has been questioned, and Castaldo later stated he was not sure. Considerable media attention focused upon Bernall, who had been killed by Harris in the library and whom Harris was reported to have asked, "Do you believe in God?" immediately prior to her murder. Bernall was reported to have responded "Yes" to this question before her murder. Emily Wyant, the closest living witness to Bernall's death, denied that Bernall and Harris had such an exchange. Joshua Lapp thought Bernall had been queried about her belief, but he was unable to correctly point out where Bernall was located, and was closer to survivor Valeen Schnurr during the shootings. Likewise, another witness, Craig Scott, claimed the discussion was with Bernall. However, when asked to indicate where the conversation had been coming from, he pointed to where Schnurr was shot. Schnurr herself claims that she was the one questioned as to her belief in God.

=== We are Columbine ===
Classes at Columbine were held at nearby Chatfield Senior High for the remaining three weeks of the 1999 school year. In August 1999, students returned to the school, and principal Frank DeAngelis led a rally of students clad in "We are Columbine" shirts.

=== Secondary casualties ===
In the years following the shooting, numerous individuals connected to the event experienced long-term physical and psychological effects. Survivors, including students and teachers, reported symptoms of post-traumatic stress disorder.

Six months after the shootings, Anne Marie Hochhalter's mother died by suicide. Hochhalter herself died on February 16, 2025, at the age of 43. According to Hochhalter's father, she died due to medical complications from the paralysis and injuries sustained during the shooting. On March 13, 2025, the Jefferson County Coroner's Office released her autopsy report, officially ruling her cause of death as homicide. The ruling brought the total number of deceased victims resulting from the attack to 14.

Greg Barnes, a 17-year-old student at Columbine who had also witnessed Sanders's shooting, and also a close friend of Kechter, died by suicide on May 4, 2000.

Survivor Austin Eubanks, who was injured during the shooting, became heavily medicated, developing an opioid addiction. He eventually overcame and later spoke publicly about the addiction, but died from an accidental overdose on May 18, 2019, at the age of 37.

=== Conspiracy theories and misinformation ===
In the immediate aftermath, conspiracy theories and unfounded claims were made by several anti-government movements and extremist religious and political movements, such as the Westboro Baptist Church and televangelist Jerry Falwell Sr.

Westboro's founder and then-leader, Fred Phelps, unfoundedly claimed that both Harris and Klebold were gay, saying: "Two filthy fags slaughtered 13 people at Columbine High." Falwell also claimed that Harris and Klebold were gay, though he retracted afterward.

Conspiracy theories also arose from anti-gun control activists and extremists, claiming that the massacre had either been staged or that both Harris and Klebold had been government agents, aiming at promoting tougher gun control legislation. Other conspiracy theories point to a mysterious third shooter that has never been identified.

Other antisemitic conspiracy theories pointed to the massacre being a Jewish conspiracy, due to Klebold's mother being Jewish.

Political commentator and conspiracy theorist Alex Jones once implied that the US government had "perpetrated" Columbine, and has claimed that "the Columbine school shootings were 100 percent false flag".

Multiple media outlets stated that the school was in Littleton; the school has a Littleton postal address, but is not in the city limits. Denver-area newspapers and outlets had more accurate information on the school's location. Because of the media reporting, the City of Littleton was linked in the minds of the public with the massacre.

== Motive ==
The shooting was planned as a terrorist-style attack that would cause "the most deaths in US history", but the motive has never been ascertained with any degree of certainty. In a letter provided with the May 15 report on the Columbine attack, Sheriff John Stone and Undersheriff John A. Dunaway wrote they "cannot answer the most fundamental question—why?" In the days following the event, media speculation regarding the killers' motive was rife. Media reports were disseminated suggesting various motives of the killers, although all theories were largely unsubstantiated and turned out to be myths. These reports included blaming bullying, goth culture, video games, Marilyn Manson, and targeting jocks and minorities. Other rumors were spread in the local area but not largely disseminated by the media, such as the false claim spread by some students that the killers were bullied because they were homosexual.

=== Mental disorder ===
==== The FBI's theory ====
The FBI concluded that the killers had mental illnesses, that Harris was a clinical psychopath, and Klebold had depression. Dwayne Fuselier, the supervisor in charge of the Columbine investigation, later remarked: "I believe Eric went to the school to kill and didn't care if he died, while Dylan wanted to die and didn't care if others died as well."

In April 1998, a year prior to the shooting, as part of his diversion program, Harris wrote a letter of apology to the owner of the van he and Klebold broke into earlier that year. Around the same time, he derided the owner of the van in his journal, stating that he believed he had the right to steal something if he wanted to. By far the most prevalent theme in Klebold's journals is his wish for suicide and his private despair at his lack of success with women, which he refers to as an "infinite sadness". Klebold had repeatedly documented his desires to kill himself, and his final remark in the Basement Tapes, shortly before the attack, is a resigned statement made as he glances away from the camera: "Just know I'm going to a better place. I didn't like life too much."

The FBI's theory was used by Dave Cullen for his 2009 book Columbine. Harris was depicted as the mastermind, having a messianic-level superiority complex and hoping to demonstrate his superiority to the world. Klebold was a follower who primarily participated in the massacre as a means to simply end his life.

This theory has been met with criticism. Critics cite the fact that Klebold, not Harris, was the first to mention a killing spree in his journal. They also cite evidence that Harris was depressed as well, such as his prescription for antidepressants mentioned below.

==== Medication ====
Opponents of contemporary psychiatry like Peter Breggin claim that the psychiatric medications prescribed to Harris may have exacerbated his aggressiveness. Harris had complained of depression, anger, and suicidal thoughts, for which he was prescribed antidepressants. Toxicology reports confirmed that Harris had fluvoxamine, sold under the brand name Luvox, in his bloodstream at the time of the shootings, whereas Klebold had no medications in his system. Harris continued his scheduled meetings with his psychologist until a few months before the massacre.

==== Other theories ====
There have been other attempts to diagnose Harris and Klebold with mental illness. Peter Langman believes Harris was a psychopath and Klebold was schizotypal. Professor Aubrey Immelman published a personality profile of Harris, based on journal entries and personal communication, and believes the materials suggested behavior patterns consistent with a "malignant narcissism...pathological narcissistic personality disorder with borderline and antisocial features, along with some paranoid traits, and unconstrained aggression." (Note: The report notes that such a profile should not be construed as a direct psychiatric diagnosis, which is based on face-to-face interviews, formal psychological testing, and collection of collateral information.)

=== Bullying ===
Early stories following the massacre charged that school administrators and teachers at Columbine had long condoned bullying by jocks and this explained the motive. The link between bullying and school violence has attracted increasing attention since.

Accounts from various parents and school staffers reported bullying in the school. Reportedly, Harris and Klebold were regularly called "faggots". Klebold said on the Basement Tapes, "You've been giving us shit for years", however, they also stated several times on the tapes and in the journals that no one else was to blame, nor could have prevented the attack. Dylan when talking to his father about the jocks had stated, "They sure give Eric hell." but he also said that the jocks tended to leave him [Dylan] alone. Brown also noted Harris was born with mild chest indent. This made him reluctant to take his shirt off in gym class, and other students would laugh at him. Nathan Vanderau, a friend of Klebold, and Alisa Owen, who knew Harris, noted they were picked on. Vanderau recalled that a "cup of fecal matter" was thrown at them.

It has been alleged that Harris and Klebold were once both confronted by a group of students at CHS who sprayed them with ketchup while referring to them as "faggots" and "queers". Klebold told his mother it had been the worst day of his life. According to Brown, "That happened while teachers watched. They couldn't fight back. They wore the ketchup all day and went home covered with it." According to classmate Chad Laughlin, it involved seniors pelting Klebold with "ketchup-covered tampons" in the commons. Laughlin also stated, "A lot of the tension in the school came from the class above us...There were people fearful of walking by a table where you knew you didn't belong, stuff like that. Certain groups certainly got preferential treatment across the board."

A similar theory was expounded by Brooks Brown in his book on the massacre, No Easy Answers; he noted that teachers commonly ignored bullying and that when Harris and Klebold were bullied by the jocks at CHS, they would make statements such as: "Don't worry, man. It happens all the time!"

Cullen, as well as forensic psychologists, psychiatrists and criminologists dispute the theory of "revenge for bullying" as the motivation. While acknowledging the pervasiveness of bullying in high schools including CHS, Cullen claimed they were not victims of bullying. He noted Harris was more often the perpetrator than victim of bullying. In an entry by Eric Harris in his journal, he stated that even if he were complimented and respected more by his peers, the attack would have still, in all likelihood, occurred. In another entry by Eric in his journal he says not to blame the school's administration for the attack as the staff were doing a good job running the school. In a fact check published on April 19, 2019, on the eve of the commemoration of the 20th anniversary of the massacre, Gillian Brockell in The Washington Post underscored that, contrary to the popular view, their attack was not revenge for being bullied. Author Jeff Kass who has also published a book on the attack believes that bullying was not the cause. Peter Langman also argues against bullying being the cause of the attack. Other researchers have also argued against the bullying hypothesis.

=== Notoriety ===
In 2004, Dave Cullen argued that according to the FBI, Harris and Klebold committed the massacre to be infamous. Some scientists also reached the same conclusion.

Adam Lankford, a researcher for the Department of Criminology and Criminal Justice in Tuscaloosa, Alabama, who identified 24 fame-seeking mass shooters between 1966 and 2015, included both Harris and Klebold in the group, partially blaming the "American idolization of fame" as a root cause.

=== Media speculation ===
==== Isolation ====
Rejection was also highlighted as a possible cause. Social cliques within high schools such as the Trench Coat Mafia were widely discussed. One perception formed was that Harris and Klebold were both outcasts who had been isolated from their classmates, prompting feelings of helplessness, insecurity, and depression, as well as a strong need for power and attention. Harris's last journal entry reads, "I hate you people for leaving me out of so many fun things", while Klebold wrote "The lonely man strikes with absolute rage." In an interview, Brown described them as the school's worst outcasts, "the losers of the losers".

This concept too has been questioned, as both Harris and Klebold had a close circle of friends and a wider informal social group. Cullen and Brockell both also say they were not in the Trench Coat Mafia and were not isolated outcasts or loners. Other close friends of the pair such as Chad Laughlin and Nathan Dykeman state the duo were not outcasts. Peter Langman also concurs by also arguing against the pair being loners and outcasts.

==== Political terrorism ====
Some peers, such as Robyn Anderson, stated that the pair were not interested in Nazism, and they did not worship or admire Hitler in any way. However, in retrospect, Anderson also stated that there were many things the pair did not tell friends. Harris at least did revere the Nazis, often praising them in his journal. While some sources claim that there is a connection to Hitler's birthday (April 20, 1889), the theory is dismissed by others since the date of the attack had been delayed due to a munitions problem.

Sociologist Ralph Larkin has theorized that the massacre was to trigger a revolution of outcast students and the dispossessed: "[A]s an overtly political act in the name of oppressed students victimized by their peers. [...] The Columbine shootings redefined such acts not merely as revenge but as a means of protest of bullying, intimidation, social isolation, and public rituals of humiliation."

In contrast with the theory that the attack was political, one author argues Columbine was only increasingly linked to terrorism after the September 11 attacks.

==== Marilyn Manson ====
In the late 1990s, Marilyn Manson and his band established themselves as a household name, and as one of the most controversial rock acts in music history. Their two album releases prior to the massacre were both critical and commercial successes, and by the time of their Rock Is Dead Tour in 1999, the frontman had become a culture war iconoclast and a rallying icon for alienated youth.

Immediately after the massacre, a significant portion of blame was directed at the band and, specifically, at its outspoken frontman. In the weeks following the shootings, media reports about Harris and Klebold portrayed them and the Trench Coat Mafia as part of a gothic cult. Early media reports alleged that the shooters were fans, and were wearing the group's T-shirts during the massacre. Although these claims were later proven to be false, news outlets continued to run sensationalist stories with headlines such as "Killers Worshipped Rock Freak Manson" and "Devil-Worshipping Maniac Told Kids To Kill". Speculation in national media and among the public led many to believe that Manson's music and imagery were the shooters' sole motivation, despite reports that revealed that the two were not big fans.

Despite this, Marilyn Manson were widely criticized by religious, political, and entertainment-industry figures. Under mounting pressure in the days after Columbine, the group postponed their last five North American tour dates out of respect for the victims and their families. Manson published his response to these accusations in an op-ed piece for Rolling Stone, titled "Columbine: Whose Fault Is It?", in which he castigated America's gun culture, the political influence of the National Rifle Association, and the media's irresponsible coverage, which he said facilitated the placing of blame on a scapegoat. After concluding the European and Japanese legs of their tour on August 8, the band withdrew from public view to work on their next album, 2000's Holy Wood (In the Shadow of the Valley of Death) as an artistic rebuttal to the allegations leveled against them.

=== Video games ===
They are able to hook into the Internet and play video games that are extraordinarily violent, that cause the blood pressure to rise and the adrenaline level to go up, games that cause people to be killed and the players to die themselves. It is a very intense experience. They are able to get into Internet chat rooms and, if there are no nuts or people of the same mentality in their hometown, hook up with people around the country.

— Chairman of the Senate Judiciary Committee Subcommittee on Youth Violence, Senator Jeff Sessions, testifying before the Senate on the Columbine tragedy, 1999.

Violent video games were also blamed. Parents of some of the victims filed several unsuccessful lawsuits against video game manufacturers. Jerald Block believes their immersion in a virtual world best explains the massacre. While Brooks Brown disagrees that video games caused the massacre, he agrees elements of their plan came from video games.

Harris and Klebold were both fans of shooter video games such as Doom, Quake, Duke Nukem 3D and Postal. A file on Harris's computer read the massacre will "be like the LA riots, the Oklahoma bombing, WWII, Vietnam, Duke and Doom all mixed together." In his last journal entry, Harris wished to "Get a few extra frags on the scoreboard." After the massacre, it was alleged Harris created Doom and Duke Nukem 3D levels resembling CHS, but these were never found.

==== Doom ====
Harris and Klebold were avid fans of Doom. Harris said of the massacre, "It's going to be like...Doom." He also wrote "I must not be sidetracked by my feelings of sympathy...so I will force myself to believe that everyone is just another monster from Doom." In Harris's yearbook, Klebold wrote "I find a similarity between people and Doom zombies." Harris named his shotgun “Arlene” after a character in the Doom novels. The TEC-9 Klebold used resembled an AB-10, a weapon from the Doom novels that Harris referenced several times.

Harris spent a great deal of time creating a large WAD, named Tier (German for 'animal', and a song by Rammstein), calling it his "life's work". The WAD was uploaded to the Columbine school computer and to AOL shortly before the attack, but appears to have been lost.

==== Duke Nukem 3D ====
The other game mentioned specifically by Harris for what the massacre would be like was Duke Nukem 3D. The game has pipe bombs and one of the enemies is the "pig cop". Brooks Brown wrote that pipe bombs were set in the halls of the school with the intention of causing a chain reaction, because that's what happens in Duke Nukem 3D. Brown also wrote that they shot wildly because it works in Duke Nukem 3D.

== Legacy ==
Following the Columbine shooting, schools across the United States instituted new security measures such as see-through backpacks, metal detectors, school uniforms, and security guards. Some schools implemented the numbering of school doors to improve public safety response. Several schools throughout the country resorted to requiring students to wear computer-generated IDs.

Schools also adopted a zero tolerance approach to possession of weapons and threatening behavior by students. Despite the effort, several social science experts feel the zero tolerance approach adopted in schools has been implemented too harshly, with unintended consequences creating other problems. Despite the safety measures that were implemented in the wake of the tragedy at Columbine, school shootings continued to take place in the United States, including at Virginia Tech, Sandy Hook Elementary School, Stoneman Douglas High School, and Robb Elementary School. The Columbine massacre remained as the deadliest mass shooting at a K–12 school in United States history, until the Sandy Hook Elementary School shooting in December 2012.

Some schools renewed existing anti-bullying policies. Rachel's Challenge was started by Rachel Scott's parents, and lectures schools about bullying and suicide.

In 2000, Sanders was posthumously given the Arthur Ashe Courage Award for his actions.

=== Police tactics ===
Police departments reassessed their tactics and now train for Columbine-like situations after criticism over the slow response and progress of the SWAT teams during the shooting.

Police followed a traditional tactic at Columbine: surround the building, set up a perimeter, and contain the damage. That approach has been replaced by a tactic known as the Immediate action rapid deployment tactic. This tactic calls for a four-person team to advance into the site of any ongoing shooting, optimally a diamond-shaped wedge, but even with just a single officer if more are not available. Police officers using this tactic are trained to move toward the sound of gunfire and neutralize the shooter as quickly as possible. Their goal is to stop the shooter at all costs; they are to walk past wounded victims, as the aim is to prevent the shooter from killing or wounding more. Dave Cullen has stated: "The active protocol has proved successful at numerous shootings... At Virginia Tech alone, it probably saved dozens of lives."

=== Lawsuits ===
After the massacre, many survivors and relatives of those killed filed lawsuits. Under Colorado state law at the time, the maximum a family could receive in a lawsuit against a government agency was $600,000 (equivalent to $1,160,000 in 2025). Most cases against the Jefferson County Sheriff's Office and school district were dismissed by the federal court on the grounds of government immunity. The case against the sheriff's office regarding the death of Dave Sanders was not dismissed due to the police preventing paramedics from going to his aid for hours after they knew the gunmen were dead. The case was settled out of court in August 2002 for $1,500,000.

In April 2001, the families of more than 30 victims received a $2,538,000 settlement in their case against the families of Harris, Klebold, Manes, and Duran. Under the terms of the settlement, the Harrises and the Klebolds contributed $1,568,000 through their homeowners' policies, with another $32,000 set aside for future claims; the Manes contributed $720,000, with another $80,000 set aside for future claims; and the Durans contributed $250,000, with an additional $50,000 available for future claims. The family of victim Shoels rejected this settlement, but in June 2003 were ordered by a judge to accept a $366,000 settlement in their $250-million lawsuit against the shooters' families. In August 2003, the families of victims Fleming, Kechter, Rohrbough, Townsend, and Velasquez received undisclosed settlements in a wrongful death suit against the Harrises and Klebolds.

Parents of some of the victims filed several unsuccessful lawsuits against film companies, over films such as The Basketball Diaries, which includes a dream sequence with a student shooting his classmates in a trench coat. In the Basement Tapes, they debate on whether or not Steven Spielberg or Quentin Tarantino are appropriate choices to direct films about the massacre. Their home videos also show inspiration taken from Pulp Fiction. Apocalypse Now was found in Harris's VCR.

=== Memorials ===
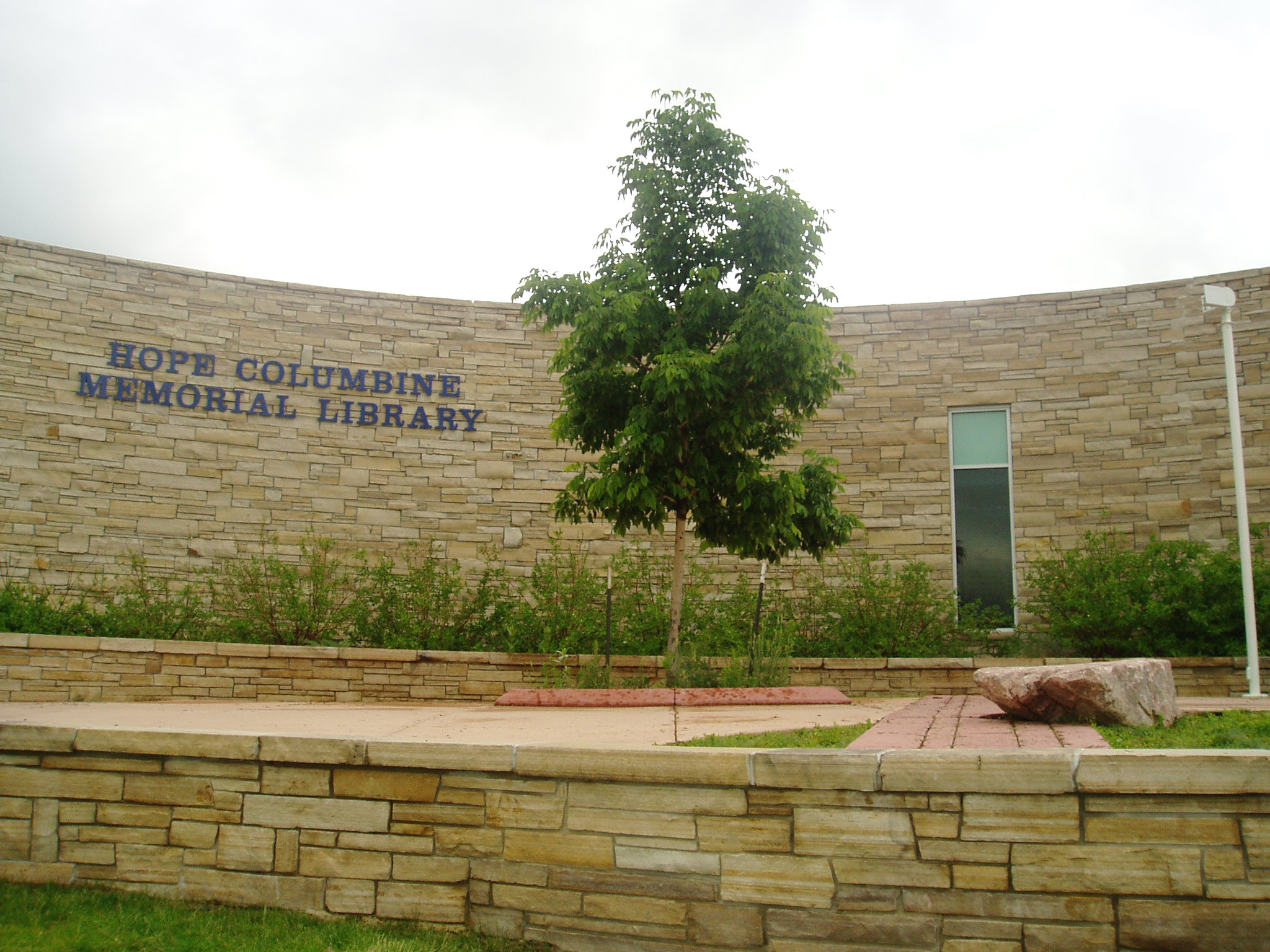
Hope Columbine Memorial Library

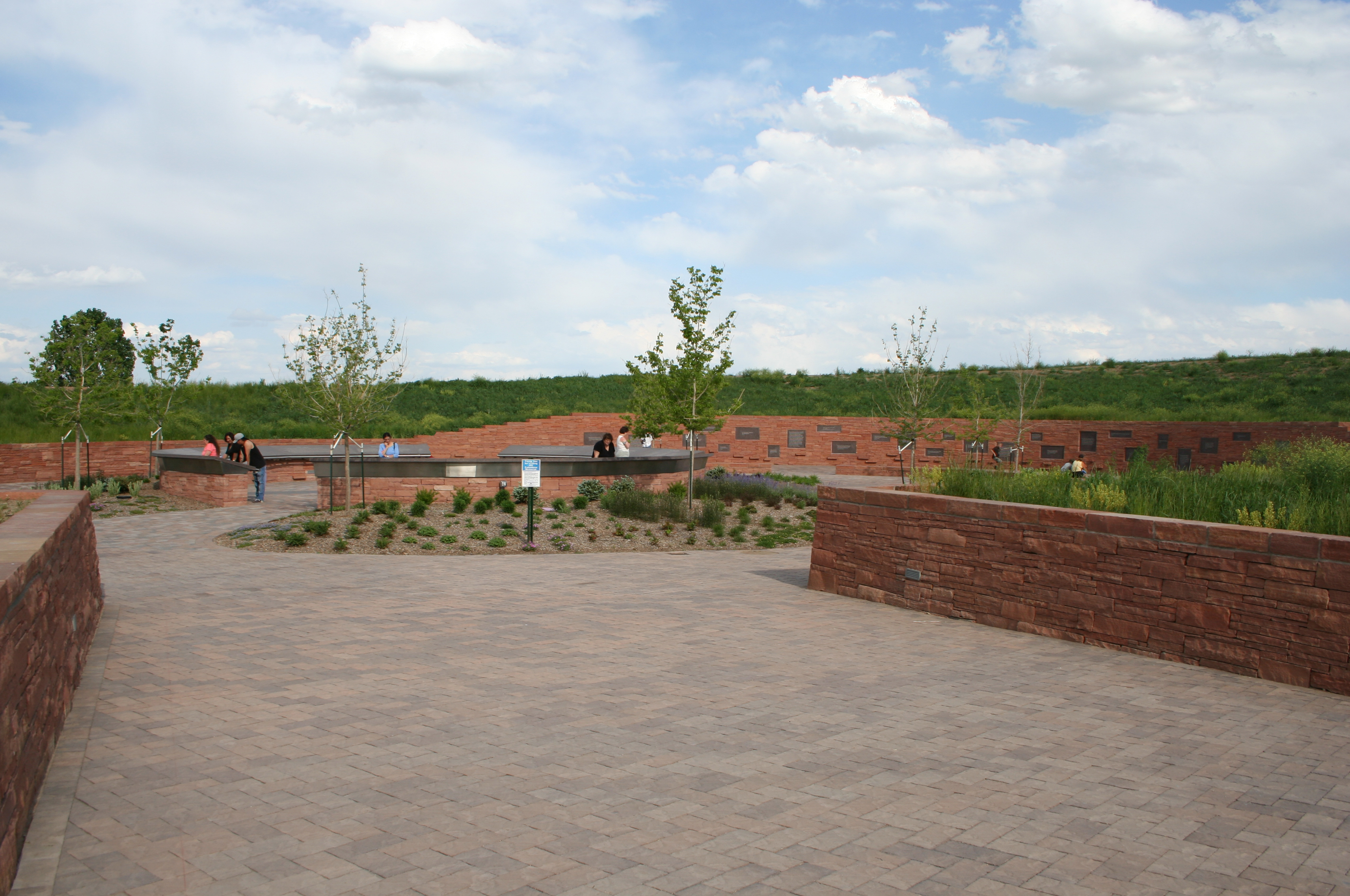
The Columbine memorial in Clement Park

Many impromptu memorials were created after the massacre, including victims Rachel Scott's car and John Tomlin's truck.

In 2000, youth advocate Melissa Helmbrecht organized a remembrance event in Denver featuring two surviving students, called "A Call to Hope". The library where most of the massacre took place was removed and replaced with an atrium. In 2001, a new library, the HOPE memorial library, was built next to the west entrance.

On February 26, 2004, thousands of pieces of evidence from the massacre were put on display at the Jefferson County fairgrounds in Golden.

A permanent memorial "to honor and remember the victims of the April 20, 1999, shootings at Columbine High School" began planning in June 1999, and was dedicated on September 21, 2007, in Clement Park. The memorial fund raised $1.5 million in donations over eight years of planning. Designing took three and a half years and included feedback from victims' families, survivors, the high school's students and staff, and the community.

Soon after the massacre, music students at CU Boulder raised money to commission a piece of music to honor Columbine. The university band turned to Frank Ticheli, who responded by composing the wind ensemble work An American Elegy. The following year, the Columbine band premiered the piece at CU Boulder's concert hall. As of 2019, Ticheli's sheet music publisher estimates An American Elegy has been performed 10,000 times.

=== Gun control ===
The shooting resulted in calls for more gun control measures. The gun show loophole and background checks became a focus of a national debate. It was the deadliest mass shooting during the era of the Federal Assault Weapons Ban. Victim Daniel Mauser's father Tom Mauser has become a gun control advocate.

In 2000, federal and state legislation was introduced that would require safety locks on firearms as well as ban the importation of magazines holding rounds over a certain number. Though laws were passed that made it a crime to buy guns for criminals and minors, there was considerable controversy over legislation pertaining to background checks at gun shows. There was concern in the gun lobby over restrictions on Second Amendment rights in the United States. Frank Lautenberg introduced a proposal to close the gun show loophole in federal law. It was passed in the Senate, but did not pass in the House.

Michael Moore's 2002 documentary Bowling for Columbine focused heavily on the American obsession with handguns, its grip on Jefferson County, and its role in the shooting.

In 2019, the MyLastShot Project was launched as a student-led gun violence prevention resource. The campaign was created by students from Columbine High School, and involves students placing stickers on their driver's licenses, student IDs, or phones that states their wishes to have the graphic photos of their bodies publicized if they die in a shooting.

=== Popular culture ===
Since the advent of social media, a fandom for Harris and Klebold has had a documented presence on social media sites, especially Tumblr and TikTok. Fans of Harris and Klebold refer to themselves as "Columbiners". A qualitative study published in 2015 on the fan cultures surrounding Harris and Klebold found that "Columbiners" function similar to other fandoms, engaging in fan art, fan fiction, and cosplay. The games Super Columbine Massacre RPG! and Pico's School were inspired by the massacre, and several books and movies have also been influenced by Columbine.

The massacre is referenced by rapper Eminem in the songs "The Way I Am", and "I'm Back". In the latter song he references the perpetrators in the lyrics, "I take seven kids from Columbine, stand 'em all in a line, add an AK-47, a revolver, a nine, a MAC-11 and it oughtta solve the problem of mine. And that's a whole school of bullies shot up all at one time". These lyrics were re-visited in his 2013 song "Rap God".

=== Copycats ===
The Columbine shootings influenced subsequent school shootings, with several such plots mentioning it. Fear of copycats has sometimes led to the closing of entire school districts. Since Columbine, over 74 copycat cases have been reported as of June 2025. In many of them, the perpetrators cited Harris and Klebold as heroes or martyrs.

== See also ==
- 1993 Aurora, Colorado shooting – The deadliest mass shooting in the state prior to the Columbine Massacre
- Gun politics in the United States
- Gun violence in the United States
- List of attacks related to secondary schools
- List of filmed mass shootings
- List of school shootings in the United States (before 2000)
- List of school shootings in the United States by death toll
- List of school-related attacks
- Mass shootings in the United States – Incidents involving multiple victims of firearm violence

== Bibliography ==
- Dafydd ab Hugh (1995). Knee Deep in the Dead. Gallery Books. ISBN 978-1-4767-3893-2.
- Brown, Brooks; Merritt, Rob (2002). No Easy Answers: The Truth Behind Death at Columbine. New York: Lantern Books. ISBN 978-1-59056-031-0.
- Cullen, Dave (2009). Columbine. Hachette Book Group. ISBN 978-0-446-54693-5.
- DeAngelis, Frank (2019). They Call Me Mr. De: The Story of Columbine's Heart, Resilience, and Recovery. David Burgess Consulting, Inc. ISBN 978-1-94959-506-2.
- Kass, Jeff (2009). Columbine: A True Crime Story. Ghost Road Press. ISBN 978-0-9816525-6-6.
- Klebold, Sue (2016). A Mother's Reckoning: Living in the Aftermath of the Columbine Tragedy. WH Allen. ISBN 978-0-7535-5679-5.
- Krabbé, Tim (2012). Wij Zijn Maar Wij Zijn Niet Geschift (in Dutch). Prometheus. ISBN 978-90-446-2054-2.
- Kushner, David (2004). Masters of Doom. Random House Publishing. ISBN 0-8129-7215-5.
- Langman, Peter (2009). Why Kids Kill: Inside the Minds of School Shooters. Macmillan. ISBN 978-0-230-61828-2.
- Larkin, Ralph W. (2007). Comprehending Columbine. Temple University Press. ISBN 978-1-59213-490-8.
- Mauser, Tom (2012). Walking in Daniel's Shoes. Ocean Star. ISBN 978-0-9853021-1-5.
- Pike, Sarah M. (September 2009). "Dark Teens and Born-Again Martyrs: Captivity Narratives after Columbine". Journal of the American Academy of Religion. 77 (3): 647–679. doi:10.1093/jaarel/lfp038. JSTOR 20630144. PMID 20681084.
- Senie, Harriet F. (2016). "The Conflation of Heroes and Victims: A New Memorial Paradigm". A Companion to Public Art (online ed.). John Wiley & Sons, Inc. pp. 107–118. ISBN 978-1-118-47533-1.
- Shapiro, Harvey (2018). The Wiley Handbook on Violence in Education: Forms, Factors, and Preventions. Hoboken, New Jersey: Wiley. ISBN 978-1-118-96667-9.
- Snow, Robert L. (2020). Prepare and Defend: Keep Yourself and Others Safe from Mass Murder Attacks. Lanham, Maryland: Rowman & Littlefield. ISBN 978-1-5381-2921-0.
- Watson, Justin (2003). The Martyrs of Columbine: Faith and the Politics of Tragedy. Palgrave Macmillan. ISBN 978-0-312-23957-2.
- Zettl, Max Sebastian; Bock, Corinne; Buderus, Petra; Pereira, Anne-Sophie; Gonçalves, Katya; Münch, Eva Elisabeth (2019). "Ursachen" [Causes]. Amok an Schulen [School Shootings] (in German). pp. 29–112. doi:10.1007/978-3-658-22708-1_3. ISBN 978-3-658-22707-4.
- "The Columbine Report". Salon. May 16, 2000. Archived from the original on May 1, 2001.
- "Investigation Report CD". Jeffco Sheriff's Office. Archived from the original on May 8, 2001 – via CNN.
- "Columbine Report documents, the "11k"". Jeffco Sheriff's Office.
- Eric Harris's journal called "The Book of God", Archived September 4, 2015, at the Wayback Machine, acolumbinesite.com. Another transcription
- Dylan Klebold's journal called "The Book of Existences", another transcription, includes yearbook
- "The Basement Tapes". Acolumbinesite.com. Archived from the original on November 25, 2010.

=== Videos ===
- "Haunted by Columbine". The New York Times. September 25, 2015. Archived from the original on October 28, 2021.
