= Columbine, Colorado =

Census-designated place in Colorado, USA

- Census-designated place
- Location of the Columbine CDP in Jefferson and Arapahoe counties, Colorado
- Coordinates: 39°35′16″N 105°04′10″W
- Country: United States
- State: Colorado
- Counties: Jefferson and Arapahoe

Government
  - Type: unincorporated community

Area
  - Total: 6.753 sq mi (17.491 km^{2})
  - Land: 6.631 sq mi (17.173 km^{2})
  - Water: 0.123 sq mi (0.318 km^{2})
- Elevation: 5,542 ft (1,689 m)

Population (2020)
  - Total: 25,229
  - Density: 3,805.0/sq mi (1,469.1/km^{2})
- Time zone: UTC–7 (MST)
  - Summer (DST): UTC–6 (MDT)
- ZIP Code: 80123, 80128
- Area codes: 303/720/983
- GNIS place ID: 2407649

Columbine (/kɒləmbaɪn/ ko-luhm-bine) is a census-designated place (CDP) in and governed by Jefferson and Arapahoe counties in Colorado, United States. The CDP is a part of the Denver metropolitan area. Located primarily in Jefferson County, Columbine lies immediately south of Denver. The population of the Columbine CDP was 25,229 at the 2020 census. The community lies in ZIP code 80123.

== History ==
Columbine grew rapidly during the Space Race years from 1958 to 1968 with the construction of the Martin Company missile facility in Waterton Canyon. Its population exceeded 20,000 for the first time in 1980.

Columbine was the site of the Columbine High School massacre in 1999 perpetrated by Eric Harris and Dylan Klebold and is known for it.

== Geography ==
Columbine is located on the eastern edge of Jefferson County with a small portion extending east into Arapahoe County. Columbine is bordered to the east by Littleton and Columbine Valley, and to the west by Ken Caryl. The Denver city limits are 0.3 miles (0.48 km) north of the northern border of Columbine, and to the south the community extends as far as the Chatfield Reservoir dam.

The Columbine CDP has an area of 4,322 acres (17.491 km^{2}), including 79 acres (0.318 km^{2}) of water.

In 2007, Ralph W. Larkin, author of Comprehending Columbine, wrote that the "Southern Jefferson County" area (in other words, the community where Columbine High School is in) "is nothing more than a series of residential developments, strip malls, and shopping centers." Larkin concluded that it "has no collective identity."

== Demographics ==
The United States Census Bureau initially defined the Columbine CDP for the 1980 United States census.

Columbine CDP, Colorado
| Year | Pop. | ±% |
|---|---|---|
| 1980 | 23,523 | — |
| 1990 | 23,969 | +1.9% |
| 2000 | 24,095 | +0.5% |
| 2010 | 24,280 | +0.8% |
| 2020 | 25,229 | +3.9% |
Source: United States Census Bureau

=== 2020 census ===
As of the 2020 census, Columbine had a population of 25,229. The median age was 44.0 years; 21.4% of residents were under the age of 18 and 21.5% were 65 years of age or older. For every 100 females there were 96.5 males, and for every 100 females age 18 and over there were 94.6 males age 18 and over.

100.0% of residents lived in urban areas, while 0.0% lived in rural areas.

There were 9,542 households in Columbine, of which 30.4% had children under the age of 18 living in them. Of all households, 61.2% were married-couple households, 13.4% were households with a male householder and no spouse or partner present, and 21.2% were households with a female householder and no spouse or partner present. About 21.0% of all households were made up of individuals and 12.0% had someone living alone who was 65 years of age or older.

There were 9,713 housing units, of which 1.8% were vacant. The homeowner vacancy rate was 0.4% and the rental vacancy rate was 3.4%.

Racial composition as of the 2020 census
| Race | Number | Percent |
|---|---|---|
| White | 21,140 | 83.8% |
| Black or African American | 203 | 0.8% |
| American Indian and Alaska Native | 170 | 0.7% |
| Asian | 622 | 2.5% |
| Native Hawaiian and Other Pacific Islander | 10 | 0.0% |
| Some other race | 624 | 2.5% |
| Two or more races | 2,460 | 9.8% |
| Hispanic or Latino (of any race) | 2,756 | 10.9% |

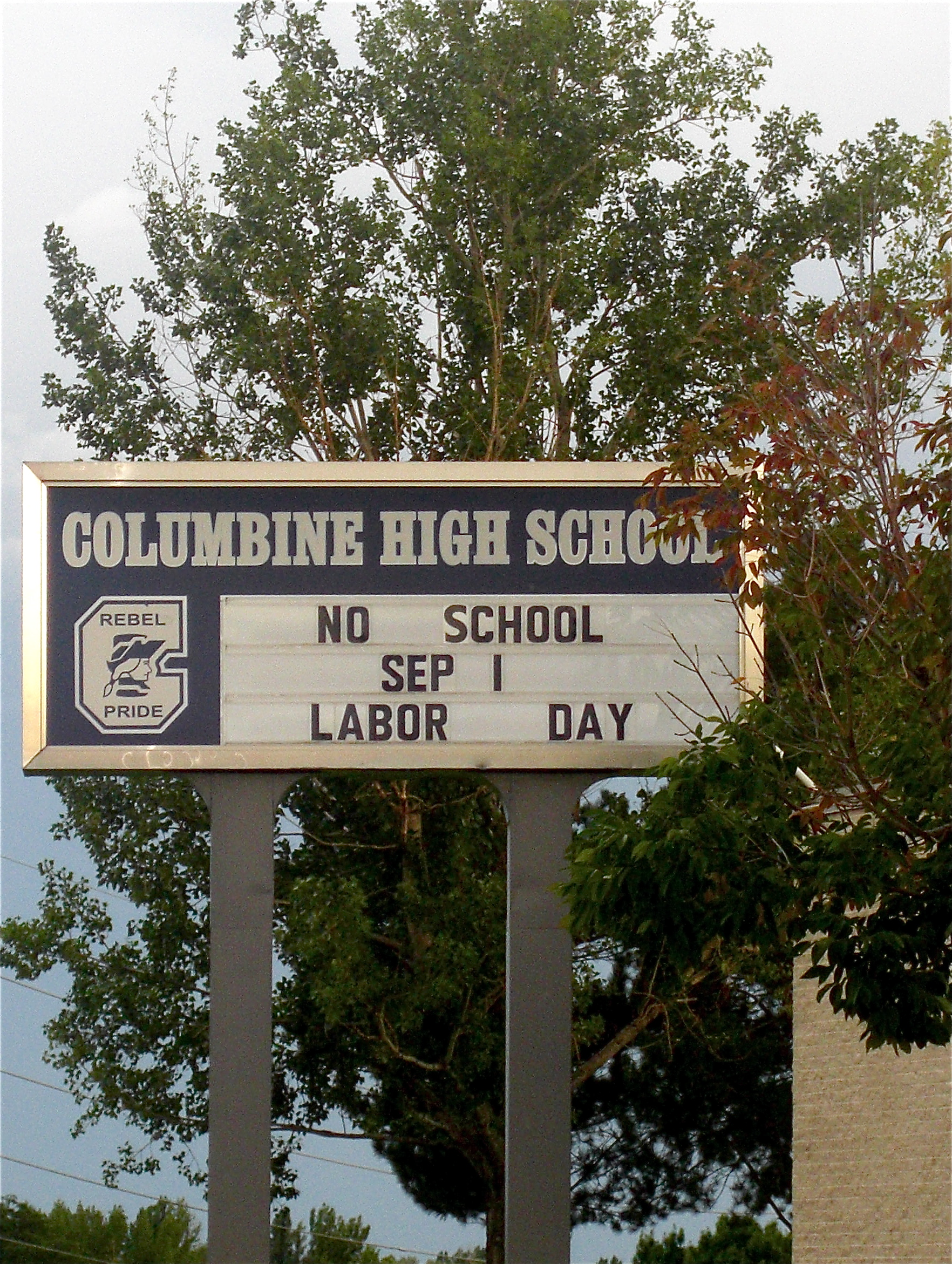
Columbine High School sign, August 2008

== Education ==
The portion of Columbine in Jefferson County is served by the Jefferson County Public Schools.

- Zoned elementary schools: Columbine Hills, Dutch Creek, Leawood, and Normandy
- Middle school: Ken Caryl Middle School
- High school: Columbine High School

The portion of Columbine in Arapahoe County is served by the Littleton Public Schools. This section is zoned to:

- Wilder Elementary School (in Columbine CDP)
- Goddard Middle School
- Heritage High School

Jefferson County Public Library operates the Columbine Library. It opened in 1989, and an expansion and renovation were completed in 2017.

== See also ==
- Front Range Urban Corridor
