= Comprehending Columbine =

2007 book by Ralph Larkin

- Author: Ralph W. Larkin
- Publisher: Temple University Press
- Publication date: 2007

Comprehending Columbine is a 2007 book by Ralph W. Larkin, published by Temple University Press.

The book is an examination of the Columbine High School massacre.

== Background ==
The author had received testimony from people who survived the massacre. The interviews took place around 2004.

Pieter Spierenberg of Erasmus University stated that the book was mostly based on the interviews, with other material being based on immediate reporting of the massacre.

== Content ==
The book explores the school culture at Columbine, which he argued contributed to the massacre occurring, as well as the interactions between Evangelical Christians and non-Evangelicals in the school community. The author stated that Evangelicals made other students feel sidelined, while athletes had enacted bullying.

Richard Hubbell of Stony Brook University stated that the book has a broader focus on the Columbine community itself instead of a narrower focus on the perpetrators, Eric Harris and Dylan Klebold.

== Reception ==
Sara Delamont of Cardiff University referred to the book as "interesting".

Overall Hubbell stated that the work is "an important first step in looking at" the subject. Hubbell argued that the fact the interviews were years after the incident meant that "the responses are most definitely tainted by the amount of cultural discussion that has occurred around the shooting." Hubbell characterizes what he feels are the shortcomings as "its few missteps".

Spierenberg stated that the work is "well-written", and described Larkin as "a good story teller" in regards to the reporting of the narrative.
