= Columbine Memorial =

Memorial in Colorado commemorating the Columbine High School massacre

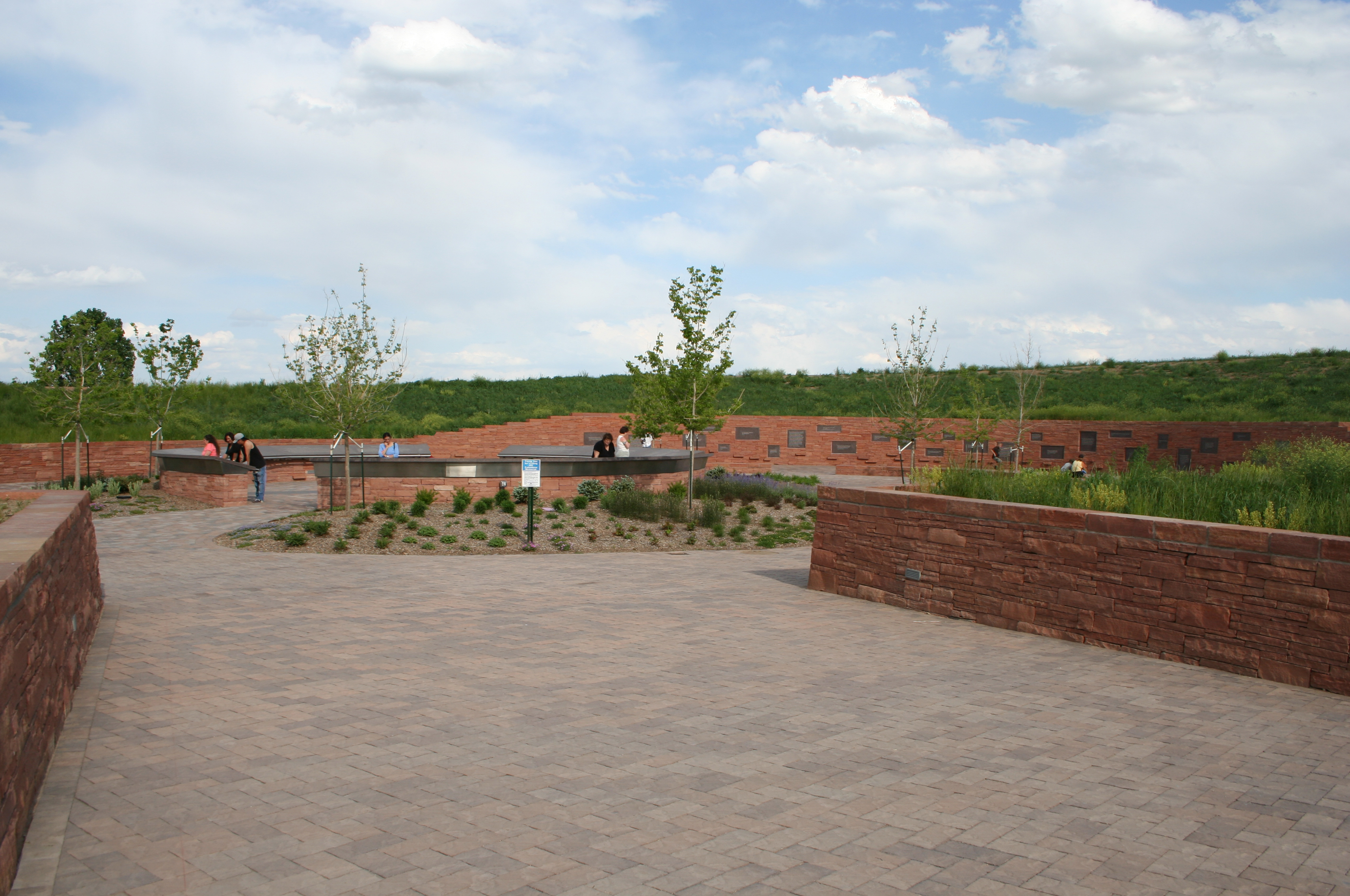
- The Columbine Memorial as it appeared in 2008
- Interactive map of the Columbine Memorial area

General information
- Status: Open
- Type: Memorial
- Coordinates: 39.6053°N 105.0787°W
- Construction started: August 2006
- Completed: September 2007
- Opening: September 21, 2007; 18 years ago (public)

Design and construction
- Architects: Victims' families, injured victims, Columbine students, faculty and staff, general public

Website
- www.columbinememorial.org

The Columbine Memorial is a memorial in Littleton, Colorado, that honors the deceased and injured victims, survivors, rescuers, and all who were affected by the Columbine High School massacre on April 20, 1999. The memorial is located in Clement Park, which is behind Columbine High School, the site of the massacre. It is operated by a non-profit institution whose mission is to operate the memorial and its upkeeping.

The memorial began planning in June 1999, approximately two months after the shooting, for victims, survivors, those involved in rescue and recovery operations and everyone touched by the shooting. Designing took three and a half years. Designing was accepted on a four-level diagram: the first was the people most affected by the shootings, the victims' families; the second was injured victims and their families; the third was past and present students and staff of the high school; and the final was the community and general public. The Foothills Foundation and the Columbine Memorial Committee raised over $1.5 million in donations over eight years of planning.

Groundbreaking of the memorial occurred in June 2006. The memorial was opened to the public on September 21, 2007.

== Background ==
On April 20, 1999, Columbine High School seniors Eric Harris and Dylan Klebold murdered 13 students, including a victim that died in 2025, and one teacher and injured 23 others. Harris and Klebold then committed suicide. It was at the time, the deadliest shooting at a high school in American history.

Many impromptu memorials were created shortly after the massacre, including Rachel Scott's car and John Tomlin's truck. The planning of a permanent memorial began in June 1999. Fifteen wooden crosses were also erected on top of a hill by Columbine High School, 13 for the victims and two for the shooters. This led to some controversy over whether or not Harris and Klebold should be memorialized. Some argued that it glorified murderers, while others argued that Harris and Klebold were victims as well. Brian Rohrbough, father of victim Daniel Rohrbough, took down the crosses, stating it was not appropriate to honor the shooters in the same place as their victims.

Sometime between November 13–15, 2020, a donation box setup to fund the maintenance and upkeep costs of the memorial was stolen.

== Design ==
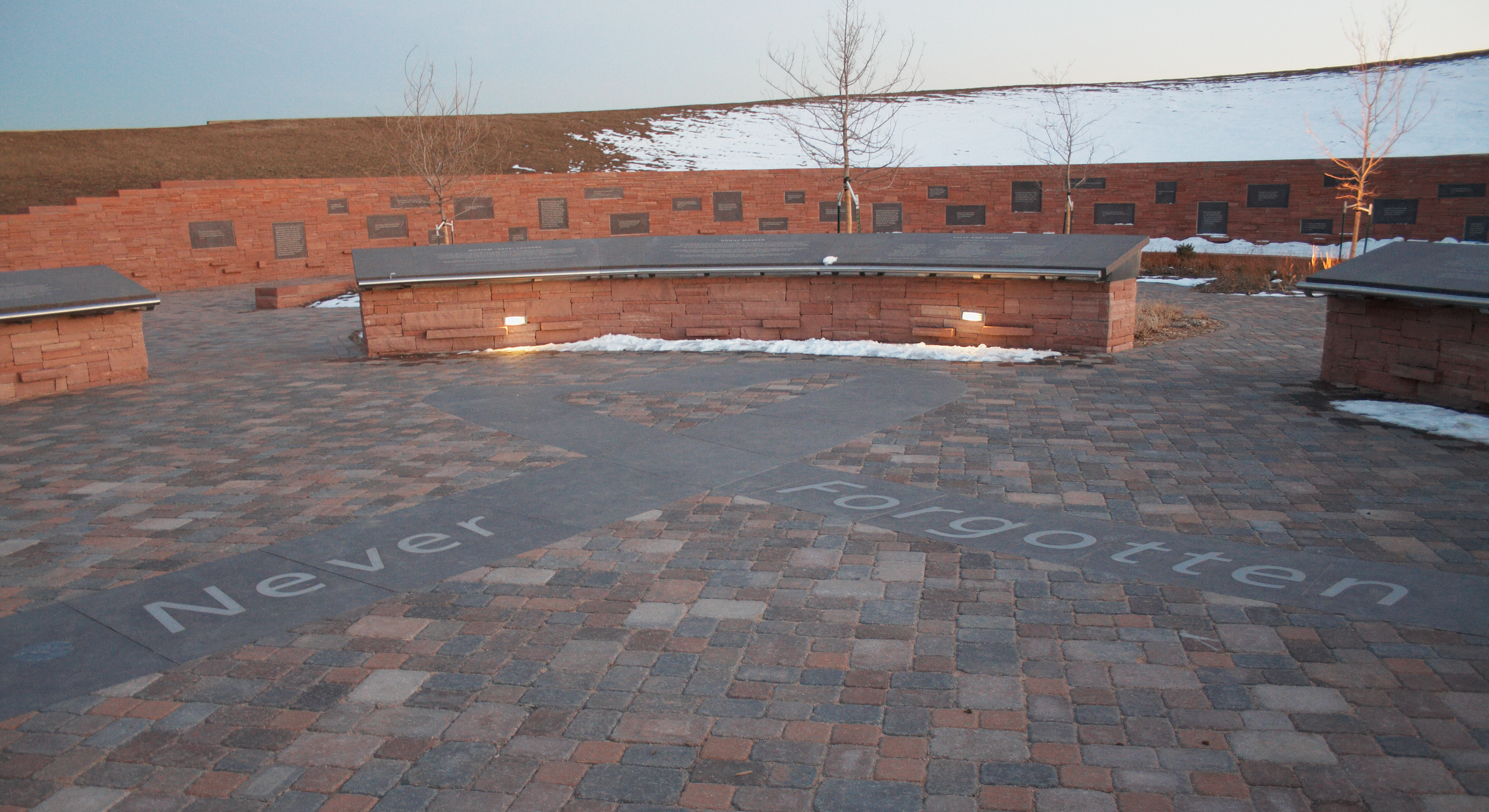
Ring of Remembrance in 2008

The main feature of the Columbine memorial is the Ring of Remembrance, set in the middle of the memorial. Victim's families provided personal statements, which were then engraved in stone as a tribute to the 13 victims. A “Never Forgotten” ribbon designed by victim Kyle Velasquez’s parents, Al and Phyllis, is in the center of the ring. Surrounding most of the memorial is the Ring of Healing, designed to "honor all those who were injured, the first responders and all those who were touched by the events of April 20, 1999."
