= Austin Eubanks =

American shooting survivor and activist (1981–2019)

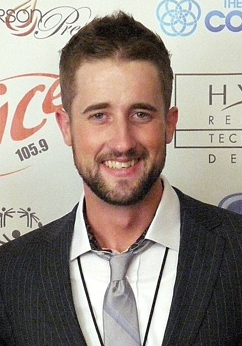
- Eubanks in 2010
- Born: Stephen Austin Eubanks; October 7, 1981; Oklahoma, U.S.
- Died: May 18, 2019 (aged 37); Steamboat Springs, Colorado, U.S.
- Cause of death: Heroin overdose
- Occupation: Motivational speaker
- Known for: Injured survivor of the Columbine High School massacre
- Children: 2

Stephen Austin Eubanks (October 7, 1981 – May 18, 2019) was an American motivational speaker on addiction and recovery. He was one of the best known survivors of the Columbine High School massacre, both in its immediate aftermath and in post-event commentary.

During the shooting, Eubanks's best friend, 17-year-old Corey DePooter, was killed and Eubanks was shot in his hand and knee. Eubanks struggled with opioid addiction and later heroin use for years after the shooting. He was the chief operations officer for the Foundry Treatment Center. Eubanks died of a heroin overdose in 2019.

== Early life and education ==
Stephen Austin Eubanks was born on October 7, 1981. When he was 11, his father, an engineer, moved the family from a small town in Oklahoma to Denver. After struggling to fit in at a larger school, Eubanks's parents allowed him to attend Columbine High School out of district. He met his friend Corey DePooter at the end of their freshman year.

At age 17, Eubanks was in the library at Columbine High School on April 20, 1999, when Eric Harris and Dylan Klebold attacked the school. Eubanks ducked under his table with DePooter, another student, Jennifer Doyle, and a second unidentified student. Harris and Klebold soon entered the library and after a while, approached their table. Harris shot and injured Doyle and DePooter. Klebold shot Eubanks in his hand and knee before killing DePooter, with Eubanks witnessing his friend's death. Harris and Klebold soon left the library and, fearing that they would return, Eubanks and other survivors fled through the library's emergency exit. Harris and Klebold would go on to kill 12 students and one teacher, injure 24 others and then die by suicide. Eubanks did not return to Columbine High School after the shooting and was instead privately tutored at home three days a week until he graduated in 2000.

Eubanks was prescribed multiple opioids to deal with the pain and mental anguish in the aftermath of the shooting. Within weeks, he developed an addiction that continued into his twenties. In 2006, Eubanks recognized that he had developed tolerance for prescription medications of Adderall, OxyContin, and Xanax. He then began using cocaine, ecstasy, and alcohol. Starting in 2006, Eubanks entered residential treatment centers three times without success.

== Career ==
Eubanks accomplished longer-term sobriety at the age of 29 after experiencing rock bottom on April 2, 2011. He had attended a Colorado Rockies game with friends the previous day, and blacked out at a restaurant after taking high doses of OxyContin and alcohol. When paramedics arrived, it was ascertained that Eubanks had a warrant out for his arrest, and he woke up in jail the next morning with no memory of what took place. Eubanks became a motivational public speaker. From 2015 to 2019, he was the chief operations officer for the Foundry Treatment Center in Steamboat Springs. He was a member of nonprofit boards and was the operations director of NorthStar Transitions in Boulder, Colorado. Eubanks was the executive director of Quiet River Transitional Recovery Community in Denver. On May 2, 2019, sixteen days before his death, Eubanks spoke at the 2019 Connecticut Opioid and Prescription Drug Prevention Conference.

== Personal life ==
Eubanks married at the age of 25 but divorced four years later. He had two sons from his marriage, and was engaged to Alex Dooley. On April 2, 2016, he celebrated five years of sobriety.

== Death ==
On May 18, 2019, Eubanks's body was found during a welfare check at his residence in Steamboat Springs, Colorado. He was 37. His family confirmed that he died of an overdose. It was later confirmed the overdose was heroin.

=== Charity ===
Eubanks's family set up a memorial fund in his name to collect tax-deductible donations. In partnership with The Onsite Foundation, a nonprofit that provides counseling and emotional health education, the family launched a therapeutic program for survivors of mass violence. The program, called Triumph Over Tragedy, was created to honor the life of Austin Eubanks, a champion for trauma-based causes and programs. His girlfriend, Laura Hutfless, helps lead the effort as a member of the foundation board.

== See also ==
- List of deaths from drug overdose and intoxication
