= MyLastShot Project =

Gun violence prevention campaign

#MyLastShot
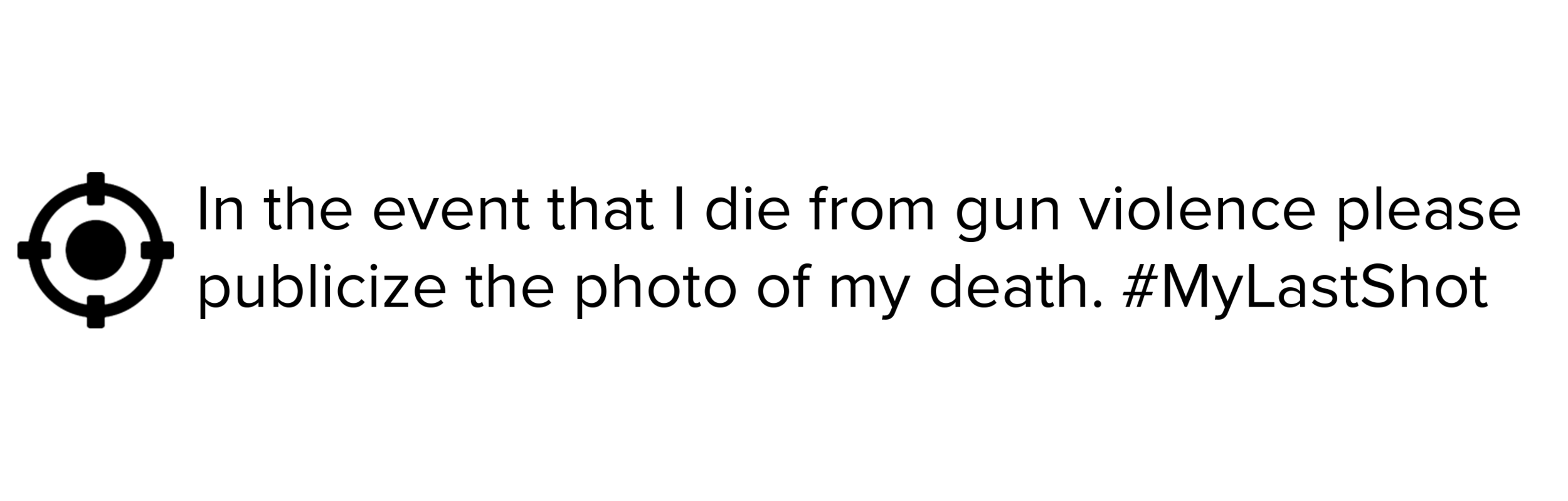
- Date: March 27, 2019
- Type: Demonstration (protest)
- Theme: Gun violence awareness Support of gun control
- Cause: Mass shootings in the United States
- Organized by: Students, Columbine High School Jacobi Mehringer (Co-Creator) and others

#MyLastShot is a campaign created by students from Columbine High School and activists on the topic of shootings. The project involves students placing stickers on their driver's licenses or student ID's that states their wishes to have the graphic photos of their bodies publicized in the incredibly rare event that they die in a shooting. The project launched on March 27, 2019, less than one month before the 20th anniversary of the Columbine Shooting which took place on April 20, 1999.

== Participation ==
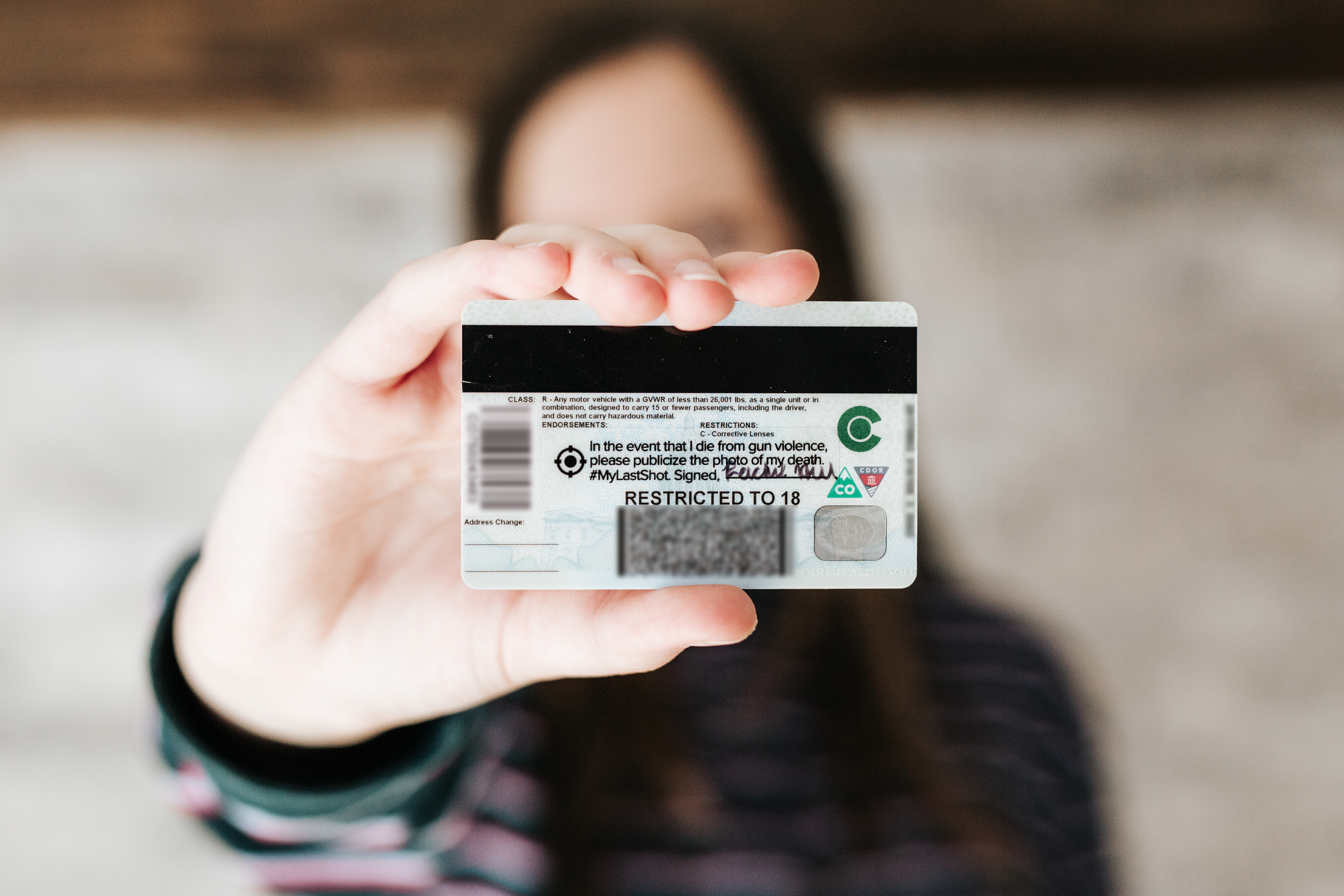
A student identification card with the #MyLastShot sticker applied to it.

In the event that I die from gun violence,
please publicize the photo of my death.
#MyLastShot. Signed, _____________

The project's website states that #MyLastShot is an 'open-source gun violence prevention resource' and that groups wanting to use their sticker or any of their campaign materials are welcome to do so without having to ask for specific permission.

== Responses ==
While some applauded the students' efforts, there were also many who opposed the need to show graphic images.

=== Responses From Elected Officials ===
On March 28, Senator Julie Gonzales (D), Colorado, referenced #MyLastShot in her speech before voting 'yes' on the Colorado Extreme Risk Protection Orders bill that passed 18–17 in the state senate.

Colorado State Representative Tom Sullivan also threw in his support of #MyLastShot in light of his own son's tragic murder in the Aurora theatre shooting. He went on to state that people need to see the photos, and that he keeps the graphic images of his son's crime scene photos on his phone to show legislators in an effort to create change.

=== #MyLastShot vs. Media Ethics ===
On March 28, 2019, Denver7 News reported on #MyLastShot pointing out how the Poynter Institute for Media Ethics typically is against the release of graphic imagery. On their website under 'Best Practices Offered For Media Coverage of Mass Shootings' they state "Be sensitive and cautious about using visual images, rather than showing graphic images of the crime scene." However, about one week after launch, Al Tompkins of the Poynter Institute wrote an article about the #MyLastShot Project giving journalists and photographers guidelines should they come upon the body of an individual with a #MyLastShot pledge. In the article, Al Tompkins writes, "...the use of such images is situational and should not be covered by a blanket “never publish” or “always publish” policy that allows journalists to escape tough calls." This stance goes contrary to Poynter's previous guidelines to stay away from showing graphic images of the crime scene. In the same week, another large media ethics institution, Reynolds Journalism Institute gave journalist Jim MacMillan a one-year grant to create new guidelines for gun violence reporting in the United States.
