= Daniel Foss =

American-Canadian sociologist

Daniel A. Foss
- Born: 26 July 1940; The Bronx, New York City, U.S.
- Died: 20 August 2014 (aged 74); Montreal, Canada
- Education: Cornell University, B.A. Brandeis University, M.A., Ph.D.
- Known for: Beyond Revolution: A New Theory of Social Movements (1986); Freak Culture: Life Style and Politics (1972)
- Scientific career
- Fields: Sociology
- Workplaces: California Institute of the Arts; Livingston College; Rutgers University

Daniel A. Foss (26 July 1940 – 20 August 2014) was an American-Canadian sociologist. He is the author of Freak Culture: Life Style and Politics (1972), and Beyond Revolution: A New Theory of Social Movements (1986).

== Early life and education ==
Daniel A. Foss was born in the Bronx, New York on 26 July 1940. He attended The Bronx High School of Science and later received his bachelor's degree in Sociology from Cornell University. He went on to study at Brandeis University, where he earned his master's degree in 1962, and his Ph.D. in Sociology in 1969. His book Freak Culture is an abridged version of his Ph.D. dissertation. In 1964 and 65 he taught sociology at Oakland University in Rochester, Michigan. After receiving his doctoral degree, he taught at the School for Critical Studies at the California Institute of the Arts, at Livingston College, and at the Newark College of Arts and Sciences at Rutgers University. He later took coursework at Syracuse University in the field of data processing, and worked in database management and programming for government and academic researchers.

== Career ==
Foss met fellow sociologist Ralph W. Larkin when they were both teaching sociology at Rutgers University. They have frequently partnered in research on the study of social movements. The book Beyond Revolution: A New Theory of Social Movements was co-authored with Larkin. As well, Foss and Larkin jointly published research in sociology journals, including a piece on the white middle class youth movement of the 1960s and its relationship to later movements such as the Children of God, the Divine Light Mission, Swami Muktananda and the Revolutionary Youth Movement in Theory and Society. They later wrote a more focused article dealing with Guru Maharaj Ji and his followers, which was published in Sociological Analysis, and a piece dealing with the vocabulary utilized in these social movements, in Social Text. Foss and Larkin's research has later been cited by books on both the 1960s subculture, and on movements of social change such as the Hippie movement and other forms of counterculture and subculture.

== Published works ==
=== Books ===
- Foss, Daniel A.; Ralph Larkin (March 31, 1986). Beyond Revolution: A New Theory of Social Movements (Critical Perspectives in Social Theory). Bergin & Garvey. p. 192. ISBN 0-89789-077-9.
- Foss, Daniel A. (1972). Freak Culture: Life Style and Politics. Dutton. pp. 218. ISBN 0-525-53004-5.

=== Articles ===
- Satin, Maurice S.; Bertrand G. Winsberg; Charlotte H. Monetti; Jeffrey Sverd; Daniel A. Foss (November 1985). "A General Population Screen for Attention Deficit Disorder with Hyperactivity". Journal of the American Academy of Child & Adolescent Psychiatry. 24 (6). Lippincott Williams & Wilkins: 756–764. doi:10.1016/s0002-7138(10)60120-3. PMID 4067144.
- Larkin, Ralph; Daniel Foss (Spring–Summer 1984). "Lexicon of Folk-Etymology". Social Text. 9/10 (The 60's without Apology): 360–377. doi:10.2307/466589. JSTOR 466589.
- Foss, Daniel A.; Ralph W. Larkin (1979). "The Roar of the Lemming: Youth Postmovement Groups, and the Life Construction Crisis". Sociological Inquiry. 49 (2–3). Blackwell Publishing Ltd: 264–85. doi:10.1111/j.1475-682X.1979.tb00375.x.
- Larkin, Ralph W.; Daniel A. Foss (Summer 1978). "Worshiping the Absurd: The Negation of Social Causality among the Followers of Guru Maharaj Ji". Sociological Analysis. 39 (2). Sociological Analysis, Vol. 39, No. 2: 157–164. doi:10.2307/3710215. JSTOR 3710215.
- Larkin, Ralph W.; Daniel A. Foss (March 1976). "From "the gates of Eden" to "day of the locust"". Theory and Society. 3 (1): 45–64. doi:10.1007/BF00158479. ISSN 0304-2421.

== See also ==
- List of sociologists
