= Ralph Larkin =

American sociologist

Ralph W. Larkin
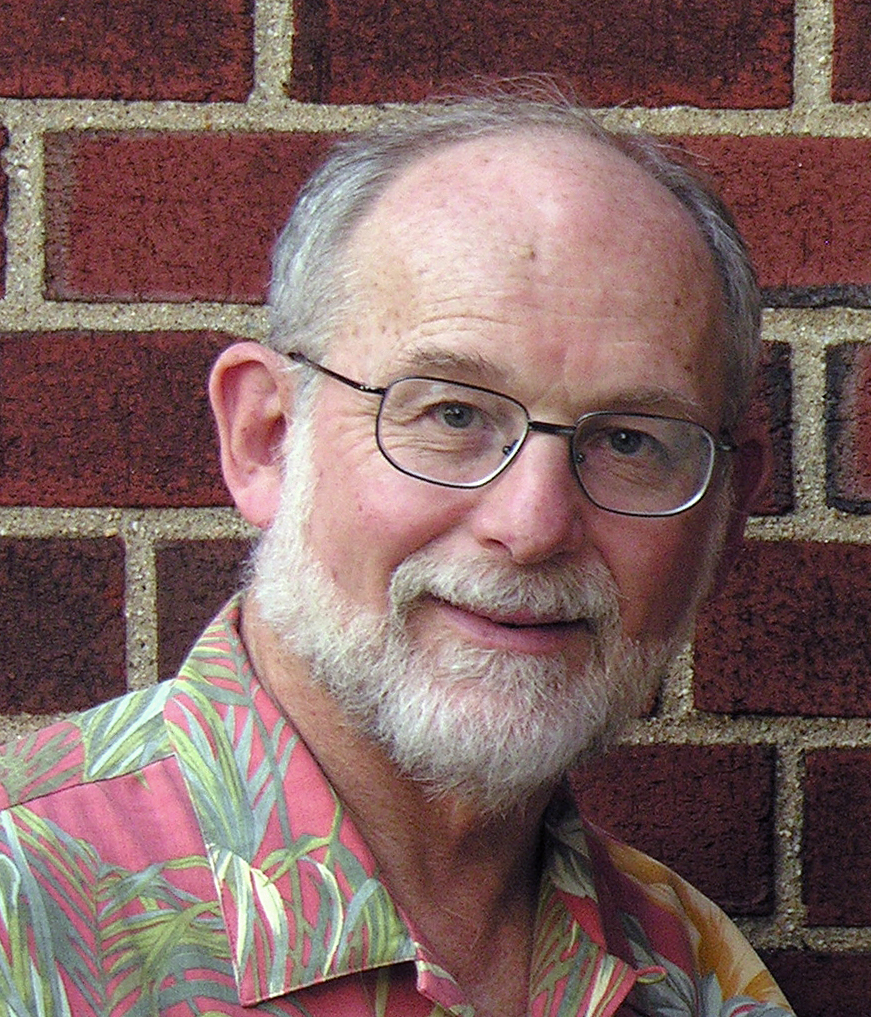
- Larkin in 2005
- Born: May 27, 1940 (age 86); Los Angeles, California, U.S.
- Education: University of California, Santa Barbara (BA); California State University at Northridge (MA); University of California, Los Angeles (PhD)
- Known for: Suburban Youth in Cultural Crisis (1979); Beyond Revolution: A New Theory of Social Movements (1986); Comprehending Columbine (2007)
- Scientific career
- Fields: Sociology
- Workplaces: Rutgers University; City University of New York; University of California, Los Angeles

Ralph Wild Larkin (born May 27, 1940) is an American sociologist and research consultant. He is the author of Suburban Youth in Cultural Crisis (1979), Beyond Revolution: A New Theory of Social Movements (1986), and Comprehending Columbine (2007). He obtained his bachelor's degree from the University of California, Santa Barbara and received a master's degree in education from California State University at Northridge.

In 1969, Larkin received a Ph.D. in the sociology of education from the University of California, Los Angeles, subsequently teaching sociology at Rutgers University, Newark, in 1973. He met fellow sociologist Daniel A. Foss while teaching at Rutgers, and they later partnered in researching social movements. They co-authored a book together on social movements, and have jointly published studies in academic journals including Theory & Society, Sociological Analysis, and Social Text. Larkin is a senior research associate and adjunct professor at the John Jay College of Criminal Justice, City University of New York, and owns his own consulting firm called Academic Research Consulting Service.

== Early life and education ==
Larkin was born in Los Angeles, California, on May 27, 1940, and obtained his bachelor's degree from the University of California, Santa Barbara in 1961. After teaching elementary school in California, Larkin obtained a master's degree in education from California State University at Northridge in 1966, and received his Ph.D. in Sociology of Education from the University of California, Los Angeles, in 1969. In 1970, Larkin moved to New York and worked as a research associate at the Center for Urban Education. He became an assistant professor of sociology at Rutgers University in 1973.

== Career ==
=== Research on social movements ===
Larkin met fellow sociologist Daniel A. Foss when they were both teaching sociology at Rutgers University. They have frequently partnered in research on the study of social movements. The book Beyond Revolution: A New Theory of Social Movements was co-authored with Foss. Larkin and Foss have also jointly published research in sociology journals, including a piece on the white middle class youth movement of the 1960s and its relationship to post-movement groups such as the Children of God, the Divine Light Mission, Swami Muktananda and the Revolutionary Youth Movement in Theory and Society. They later wrote a more focused article dealing with Guru Maharaj Ji and his followers, which was published in Sociological Analysis, and a piece dealing with the vocabulary utilized in these social movements, in Social Text. Larkin and Foss' research has later been cited by books on both the 1960s subculture, and on movements of social change such as the middle class youth movement and other forms of counterculture and subculture.

=== Teaching ===
Larkin taught in the Department of Sociology at the Newark College of Arts and Science and in the Graduate Sociology Department of Rutgers University, and was also a research associate at the Center for the Study of Evaluation, University of California, Los Angeles Graduate School of Education. After the publication of his work Comprehending Columbine (which discussed possible cultural and societal causes for the Columbine High School massacre), Larkin was contacted by the press for comment on the massacre, and discussed a judge's decision to seal information and tapes containing information about the killers. "The judge said the tapes were incendiary. We have plenty of things already that stimulate violence," said Larkin. Prior to writing the book, Larkin had given a seminar at the John Jay College of Criminal Justice's Center on Terrorism, entitled: "From Oklahoma City to Columbine: Paramilitary Influences on Eric Harris and Dylan Klebold." Larkin was an adjunct professor at the John Jay College of Criminal Justice, City University of New York. He ran his own consulting firm called Academic Research Consulting Service for 25 years.

=== School Rampage Shootings ===
Following the Publication of Comprehending Columbine, Larkin published several articles about school rampage shootings, most notably, "The Columbine Legacy: Rampage Shootings as Political Acts, which provided data that offered an alternative explanation to the causes of school shootings against the dominant notion that the ultimate cause was mental illness. Although some rampage shooters demonstrated serious psychological problems, by defining school rampage shootings as merely "the kids were crazy," the social contexts of school shootings were ignored, even when shooters claimed their acts were motivated by revenge. The Columbine shootings were a cultural watershed because Klebold and Harris were media savvy and broadcast their intentions and reasons. The Columbine shootings were a consequence of conflict between outcasts and elites within the high school, where "jocks" ruled the halls and persecuted those who did not live up to a hypermasculine ideology that was tacitly supported by the school administration, dominated by former coaches. Subsequent rampage shooters and would-be shooters studied and imitated the Columbine shootings, making the political dimension increasingly obvious. In addition, to "The Columbine Legacy," Larkin (2011) wrote, "Masculinity, school shooters, and the control of violence," which chronicled the crisis of masculinity generated by the social movements of the 1960s and early 1970s, the cultural reactions against the rising masculine alternatives generated by the woman's and gay rights movements, and how the problematization of masculinity influenced the rise in rampage shootings, especially in the US. Drawing from his research on Columbine, he wrote, "Legitimated Adolescent Violence: Lessons from Columbine" that described how the social structural dimensions of a school and community can result in blindness to the predation of low status students and tacit acceptance of violence down the school social hierarchy. Finally, he analyzed how Elliot Rodger studied and learned how to become a rampage shooter before he terrorized a student enclave at the University of California, Santa Barbara, killing six persons and injuring several others before succumbing to a self-inflicted gun shot.

== Published works ==
=== Books ===
- Larkin, Ralph W. (January 28, 2007). Comprehending Columbine. Temple University Press. ISBN 978-1-59213-491-5.
- Foss, Daniel A.; Ralph Larkin (March 31, 1986). Beyond Revolution: A New Theory of Social Movements (Critical Perspectives in Social Theory). Bergin & Garvey. ISBN 0-89789-077-9.
- Larkin, Ralph W. (October 18, 1979). Suburban Youth in Cultural Crisis. Oxford University Press. ISBN 0-19-502523-7.

=== Articles ===
- Larkin, Ralph W. (2009). "The Columbine legacy: Rampage shootings as political acts". American Behavioral Scientist. 52 (9): 1309–1326. doi:10.1177/0002764209332548. S2CID 144049077.
- Larkin, Ralph W. (November 1, 1988). "Lurching Toward the Millennium: Youth in the Next Decade". The World & I Online (Modern Thought / Children of the Baby Boomers: Prospects for the Future).
- Larkin, Ralph; Daniel Foss (Spring–Summer 1984). "Lexicon of Folk-Etymology". Social Text. 9/10 (The 60's without Apology). Duke University Press: 360–377. doi:10.2307/466589. JSTOR 466589.
- Foss, Daniel A.; Ralph W. Larkin (1979). "The Roar of the Lemming: Youth Postmovement Groups, and the Life Construction Crisis". Sociological Inquiry. 49 (2–3). Blackwell Publishing Ltd: 264–85. doi:10.1111/j.1475-682X.1979.tb00375.x.
- Larkin, Ralph W.; Daniel A. Foss (Summer 1978). "Worshiping the Absurd: The Negation of Social Causality among the Followers of Guru Maharaj Ji". Sociological Analysis. 39 (2). Oxford University Press: 157–164. doi:10.2307/3710215. JSTOR 3710215.
- Larkin, Ralph W.; Daniel A. Foss (March 1976). "From "the gates of Eden" to "day of the locust"". Theory and Society. 3 (1): 45–64. doi:10.1007/BF00158479. ISSN 0304-2421. S2CID 140396408.
- Larkin, Ralph W. (Autumn 1975). "Social Exchange in the Elementary School Classroom: The Problem of Teacher Legitimation of Social Power". Sociology of Education. 48 (4). American Sociological Association: 400–410. doi:10.2307/2112257. JSTOR 2112257.
- Larkin, Ralph W. (Autumn 1973). "Contextual Influences on Teacher Leadership Styles". Sociology of Education. 46 (4). American Sociological Association: 471–479. doi:10.2307/2111900. JSTOR 2111900.
- Larkin, Ralph W. (November 1972). "Class, Race, Sex and Preadolescent Attitudes". California Journal of Educational Research. 23 (5): 213–23.
- Larkin, Ralph W. (1970). "Pattern Maintenance and Change in Education". The Teachers College Record. 72 (1). Teachers College, Columbia University: 111–120. doi:10.1177/016146817007200111. S2CID 150385631.

== See also ==
- List of sociologists
