= Sara Delamont =

American social scientist

Sara Delamont DSc Econ, AcSS FLSW is a reader in the School of Social Sciences at Cardiff University. She was the first woman to be the president of the British Educational Research Association and the first woman Dean of Social Sciences at Cardiff University. Dr Delamont's research covers many different areas and disciplines including anthropology, feminist and gender studies, the sociology of education, food, professions and qualitative research methods.

== Education ==
Sara Delamont studied archaeology and anthropology at Girton College, Cambridge and graduated with First Class Honours in 1968. After Cambridge she studied for a PhD in Edinburgh which she completed in 1978.

== Career ==
Delamont's first post was a two-year research position at the University of Edinburgh whilst writing up her doctoral thesis, after which she lectured in sociology of education for three years at the University of Leicester, before moving to Cardiff University and joining the School of Social Sciences in 1976. She was promoted to senior lecturer in 1979 and Reader in 1989. She was the first woman to become dean of the Faculty of Economic and Social Studies (1983-1985) and chair of its successor body, the Humanities and Social Sciences Board from 2001 to 2008.

== Awards and honours ==
In 1984, Delamont was elected the first woman president of the British Educational Research Association (BERA), then elected to the Academy of Learned Societies for the Social Sciences in Nov 2000. Cardiff University awarded her an honorary degree- D.Sc Econ (Cardiff) in July 2007. In 2013 she was awarded the British Sociological Association Distinguished Service Award for her contribution to British Sociology, and was honoured with the Lifetime Achievement Award at Cardiff University's Celebrating Excellence Awards. In 2014, Delamont was elected a Fellow of the Learned Society of Wales.
