= Stevens Model 311 =

Side-by-side double barreled shotgun

Stevens 311
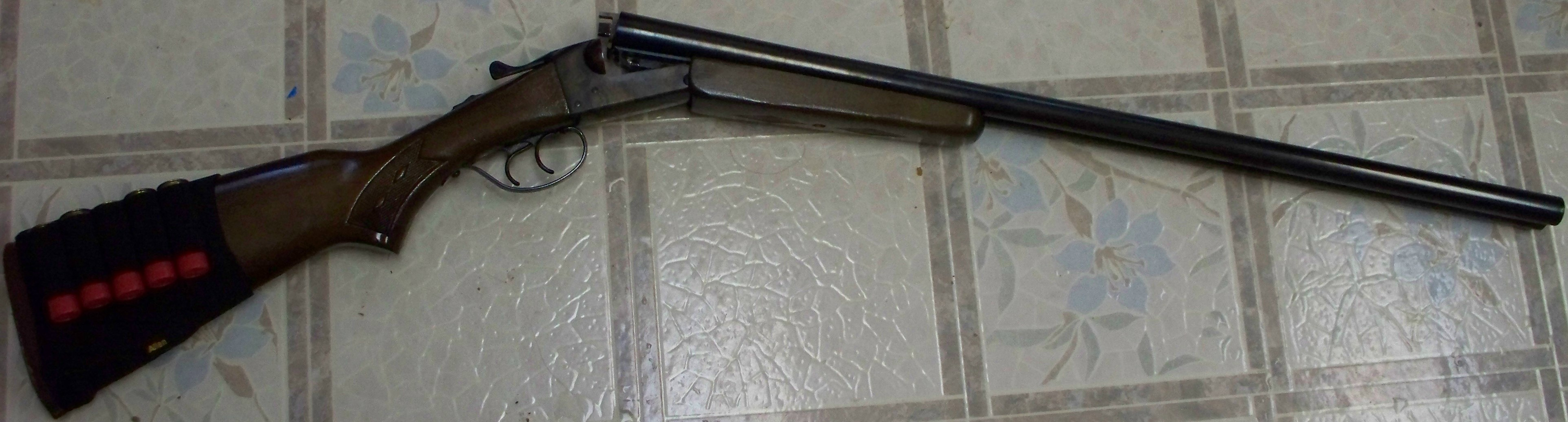
- Springfield/Stevens 511
- Type: Double barrel shotgun
- Place of origin: United States

Production history
- Manufacturer: Stevens Arms
- Produced: 1920–1988
- No. built: About 5,000,000
- Variants: Stevens: 311, 311A, 311C, 311D, 311E, 311F, 311H, 311S, 311T, 311R, 330, 331, 530, 530A, 530M, 550 Springfield: 511, 511A, 5000, 5100

Specifications
- Mass: 7½ pounds (12 Gauge)
- Length: 36½ inches
- Barrel length: 26inches, 18.25 inches (Riot Gun)
- Caliber: 12 gauge, 16 gauge, 20 gauge, .410 gauge
- Action: Break-action

The Stevens 311 is a side-by-side double-barreled shotgun which is a member of a family of 12 gauge double barreled shotguns that were manufactured by Stevens from 1877 to 1988. The actual Stevens 311 started manufacture around 1920 when it was called the Springfield 5000, changing names to the 5100 in 1931 and finally being renamed the Stevens 311 in 1940. It was considered a utility grade of shotgun without checkering or engraving and a trigger for each barrel. The shotgun is a boxlock type of shotgun. The more "deluxe" double shotgun of the 311 type have the Savage name reserved for them and is called the Savage Fox model B.

== Stevens Model 311R ==
The Stevens Model 311R ("R" standing for "Riot") was produced and was popular with detectives, including officers serving with the New York Police Department. The 20 gauge version was popular with urban detectives due to its light recoil and reduced chance of overpenetration when using No. 3 buckshot loads. The shotgun was produced in both 12 and 20 gauge. It had an 18.25 inch barrel and a 34.5 inch overall length, and weighed 6.75 lbs, making it handy in confined spaces such as hallways.

== Users ==
- United States
  - New York Police Department Stevens 311 -12 gauge 18.25-inch barrel, Detectives and Stakeout Squad officers
