= Eric Harris and Dylan Klebold =

American mass murderers (1981–1999)

- Harris (left) and Klebold (right) in their 1999 senior year portraits
- Born: Eric David Harris; April 9, 1981; Wichita, Kansas, U.S. Dylan Bennet Klebold; September 11, 1981; Lakewood, Colorado, U.S.
- Died: April 20, 1999 (Harris (aged 18) and Klebold (aged 17); Columbine, Colorado, U.S. (both)
- Cause of death: Self-inflicted gunshot wound (both)
- Education: Columbine High School (both)
- Occupations: Harris: Shift leader at Blackjack Pizza; Klebold: Cook at Blackjack Pizza
- Known for: Perpetrators of the Columbine High School massacre
- Parent(s): Harris: Wayne Harris and Katherine Poole; Klebold: Thomas Klebold and Susan Yassenoff

Details
- Victims: Cassie Bernall; Rachel Scott; Anne Marie Hochhalter; Isaiah Shoels; Kelly Fleming; William "Dave" Sanders; Matthew Kechter; Kyle Velasquez; John Tomlin; Lauren Townsend; Daniel Mauser; Daniel Rohrbough; Corey DePooter; Steven Curnow
- Date: April 20, 1999; 27 years ago 11:19 a.m. – 12:08 p.m. MDT (UTC−6)
- Location: Columbine High School
- Targets: Students and staff at Columbine High School; first responders
- Killed: 14 (total, including a victim who died in 2025): Harris: 9; Klebold: 5
- Injured: 23 (3 indirectly; combined total): Harris: 13; Klebold: 10
- Weapons: Harris: Hi-Point 995 carbine, Savage 67H pump shotgun, explosives and two knives Klebold: Intratec TEC-DC9, Stevens 311D double-barreled sawed-off shotgun, explosives and two knives (Note: Neither Harris nor Klebold used their knives during the shooting.)

Eric David Harris (April 9, 1981 – April 20, 1999) and Dylan Bennet Klebold (/ˈkliːboʊld/ KLEE-bohld; September 11, 1981 – April 20, 1999) were an American mass murder duo who perpetrated the Columbine High School massacre, where they killed 13 students and one teacher, and wounded 23 others. (Note: Anne Marie Hochhalter, who was one of the wounded students, died in February 2025. Harris and Klebold directly wounded 20 people by gunfire; three others received injuries related to the attack.) After killing most of their victims in the school library, the two died from suicide by gunshot. At the time, the attack was the deadliest high school shooting in United States history. (Note: Many early reports said the Columbine massacre was the worst school-related massacre in U.S. history. However, the 1927 Bath School disaster (a bombing) left 44 dead. The 1966 University of Texas tower shooting was the deadliest school shooting at the time. It remained the deadliest public school shooting in American history until the 2012 Sandy Hook elementary school shooting and the deadliest high school shooting until the 2018 Stoneman Douglas High School shooting.) The ensuing media frenzy and moral panic turned "Columbine" into a byword for school shootings, and the event into one of the most infamous mass shootings.

Harris and Klebold met while attending middle school and gradually became close. By their junior year of high school, they were described as best friends who were dependent on one another. Early reports characterized them as unpopular and frequent targets of bullying; however, many peers later stated that the two were not near the bottom of the school's social hierarchy, as both had numerous friends and active social lives. Columbine High School was alleged to have an intense "jock culture", in which popular students—primarily athletes—received preferential treatment from faculty and peers. Harris and Klebold often wore black trench coats in their everyday attire; as a result, it was initially believed that they were members of a school clique known as the "Trenchcoat Mafia", a group of students who were said to rebel against the school's norms. This was later found to be unsubstantiated, as Harris and Klebold had little to no affiliation with the group.

According to their writings, Harris and Klebold appear to have begun planning the attack by May 1998, nearly a year beforehand, although each had previously made references to a shooting. Over the following eleven months, they secretly built explosives and amassed an arsenal of weapons, planning to attack in April 1999, just weeks before their graduation. Both left behind journals and video recordings, created individually and together, that foreshadowed the massacre and provided insight into their rationale for the shooting. They intended for this material to be widely viewed and to inspire followers, although much of it has never been released by authorities. The FBI concluded in May 2000 that Harris exhibited psychopathic traits, including narcissism, unconstrained aggression, and a lack of empathy, while Klebold was described as an angry depressive with a vengeful attitude toward individuals he believed had mistreated him.

However, since neither Harris nor Klebold had been formally diagnosed with any personality disorders during their lifetimes, these conclusions have been criticized and remain debated. In the years after the massacre, news outlets and commentators have attributed the attack to various motivating factors, including bullying, mental illness, racism, psychiatric medication, and exposure to violence in media. The exact motive for the attack remains inconclusive. Harris and Klebold have become figures in popular culture, portrayed, alluded to, and depicted in various media. Some perpetrators of subsequent attacks have cited the duo as an influence, a phenomenon commonly referred to as the "Columbine effect".

== Early life ==
=== Eric Harris ===
Harris as a child

Eric David Harris was born on April 9, 1981, in Wichita, Kansas, to Katherine Ann (née Poole) and Wayne Harris. His father served in the United States Air Force as a transport pilot, while his mother was a part-time caterer. Both of his parents were born and raised in Colorado. Their first son, Kevin, was born in 1978.

When Harris was two years old, the family moved to Dayton, Ohio. In 1989, they moved to Oscoda, Michigan. While living in Oscoda, pastor William Stone recalled the family as "great neighbors" and said he often saw Wayne highly engaged with his sons.

The Harris family then moved to Plattsburgh, New York, in 1991. At Stafford Middle School, Harris played Little League Baseball, regularly attended birthday parties, and was described as "part of the crowd". Kyle Ross, a former classmate in Plattsburgh, remembered him as "just a typical kid." The Harris family then settled in Littleton, Colorado in 1993 following Wayne's retirement from the military. They lived in rented accommodations during their first three years in the area, until purchasing a home south of Columbine High School. Harris's father took a job with Flight Safety Services Corporation, and his mother became a part-time caterer.

In a 1997 English class assignment, Harris recalled the difficulty of moving from New York to Colorado: "It was the hardest moving from Plattsburgh. I have the most memories from there. When I left [my friends] I felt alone, lost and even agitated that I had spent so much time with them and now I have to go because of something I can't stop." In one of the so-called "Basement Tapes", he blamed his father for moving the family frequently, stating that it forced him to "start out at the bottom of the ladder." Shortly after moving to Littleton, Harris began attending Ken Caryl Middle School. Around the same time, he underwent two surgical operations to correct pectus excavatum, a congenital condition in which the breastbone sinks into the chest. The deformity remained mildly observable at the time of his autopsy.

=== Dylan Klebold ===
Klebold as a child

Dylan Bennet Klebold was born on September 11, 1981, in Lakewood, Colorado, to Sue (née Yassenoff) and Thomas Klebold. Both of his parents were born and raised in Ohio, where they met while studying at Ohio State University. After graduating, they married in 1971, and their first son, Byron, was born in 1978.

In a 2016 interview with Colorado Public Radio, Sue recalled experiencing a fleeting sense of foreboding at Dylan's birth, describing it as "a passing feeling that went over very quickly, like a shadow", which she interpreted as a warning that her child might bring her great sorrow. As an infant, Klebold was treated for pyloric stenosis, a condition in which the opening between the stomach and small intestine thickens, causing severe vomiting during the first few months of life.

After living in Littleton, the Klebold family sought a change of scenery and, in 1989, moved to a large home south of the city in the Deer Creek Mesa foothills. Thomas had previously worked in geophysical consulting but was operating a rental management business from home at the time of the massacre. Sue worked for the Colorado Community College System, where she administered job training grants for people with disabilities. In line with Thomas's religious background, the family attended a Lutheran church for a period about five years before the shooting, where Klebold and his brother attended confirmation classes. The family also observed Passover, reflecting Sue's distant Jewish heritage. Both parents were described as generally non-religious and pacifists who opposed weapons.

Klebold attended Normandy Elementary School for first and second grade before transferring to Governor's Ranch Elementary School, where he was part of the Challenging High Intellectual Potential Students (CHIPS) program for gifted children. Classroom accounts reported that he was academically bright as a young child but appeared somewhat sheltered, which reportedly made his transition to middle school difficult. His parents were described as mostly unconcerned about his adjustment difficulties, believing such challenges to be typical for young adolescents. During his earlier school years, Klebold was a member of the Cub Scouts alongside Brooks Brown, who had been his friend since first grade. He also played baseball and was described as an avid fan of the sport, participating in a fantasy league and frequently wearing a Boston Red Sox cap.

== Background ==
=== Friendship ===
==== Overview ====
Harris and Klebold became friends while attending Ken Caryl Middle School. They entered Columbine High School in 1995 as freshmen, shortly after the school had undergone a major renovation and expansion. At Columbine High School, they formed a close-knit friend group, with social activities including bowling, shooting pool, carpooling, watching films, and playing video games together. After their sophomore year of high school, Harris and Klebold were described as nearly inseparable. Detailed information about their private conversations remains limited: aside from the "Basement Tapes", for which only transcripts have been released, along with a brief audio clip recorded surreptitiously by a victim's father, few direct records are available.

Judy Brown, mother of Brooks Brown, stated that she believed Harris was more emotionally dependent on Klebold, who was more widely liked among the student population. In his writings, however, Klebold expressed feelings of not being loved or accepted, which some sources suggest may have led him to seek validation from Harris. Sue Klebold has stated that she believes her son's self-destructive tendencies, combined with Harris's anger, led the two to reinforce each other's behavior, resulting in what became an unhealthy dynamic.

==== Personalities ====
Some peers described Harris as charismatic, while others described him as polite and likable. According to various accounts, he had many friends and played midfield for a local soccer team, the Colorado Rush, during his first two years of high school. Josh Swanson, a former teammate, said that Harris was a "solid" soccer player who greatly enjoyed the sport. By his junior year, however, Harris was reported to be quick to anger and to make frequent threats against others. Classmates observed a change in his style of dress, noting that he shifted from preppy attire to darker, cargo-style clothing.

Harris reportedly boasted about his ability to deceive others, stating in one recording that he could make anyone believe anything. Brooks Brown recalled an incident in which, after a girl declined to continue dating Harris following their attendance at freshman homecoming together, Harris staged a mock suicide using fake blood, with Brown assisting in the deception. When the girl encountered Harris lying on the ground as if dead, she screamed for help; he then stood up and laughed, prompting her to storm off in tears.

Although some described Klebold as friendly and easygoing, many considered him shy and quiet. He was often fidgety and hesitant to engage with new people. Like Harris, observers noted a change in Klebold's behavior after junior year, becoming more short-tempered and prone to outbursts of anger. Prior to the shooting, he had been disciplined for swearing at teachers, slamming classroom doors, and defacing a locker with a homophobic slur.

=== Initial high school activity ===
==== Computer use ====
Amid a technological boom, Harris, Klebold, and their group of friends owned personal computers, which allowed them to remain active on the internet. They also connected their computers on a private server to play first-person shooter games together, including Doom II and Quake. In 1996, Harris began creating a set of levels for Doom II, which later infamously became known as the "Harris levels". The levels are downloadable over the internet through Doom WADs.

Harris maintained a significant online presence under the handle "REB" (short for Rebel, a nod to the mascot of Columbine High) and other aliases, including "Rebldomakr", "Rebdoomer", and "Rebdomine". Klebold went by the names "VoDKa" and "VoDkA", after the alcoholic beverage and as a play on his initials. Harris operated various websites that hosted his Doom and Quake files, as well as information about the teams with whom he gamed online. These websites were shut down by America Online hours after the shootings and preserved for the FBI.

Harris was described as a good student and respectful towards teachers. Klebold was known to be intelligent, pursuing advanced coursework, though he was reportedly apathetic about paying attention in class and maintaining his grades. He and Harris, along with their friend Zack Heckler, were involved in video and sound productions and worked as computer assistants, helping to maintain Columbine High School's network. In October 1997, however, all three had their privileges revoked and were suspended after gaining unauthorized access to students' locker combinations.

==== Early police reports ====
During the early months of 1997, Harris, Klebold, and their friends engaged in acts of mischief on weekends. These nighttime activities reportedly involved setting off explosives, stealing street signs, vandalizing the homes of classmates they disliked, and consuming alcohol together afterwards. In his webpages, Harris referred to the acts as "rebel missions", summarizing his involvement in "mission logs." Shortly afterward, Harris briefly came to the attention of police following complaints of property damage in the neighborhood.

Brooks Brown, who had previously been friendly with Harris, severed ties with him in February 1997 after Harris damaged Brown's car windshield with a chunk of ice during an argument. In response, Brown informed Harris's parents of their son's secret alcohol collection and persuaded them to have Harris apologize in person to the Brown family for the windshield. Humiliated by the incident, Harris soon began posting death threats to Brown on his website, writing, "All I want to do is kill and injure as many of you as I can, especially a few people. Like Brooks Brown." On August 7, 1997, an anonymous "concerned citizen" reported one of Harris's websites to the Jefferson County Sheriff's Office for online threats against the Browns, who were subsequently notified. Months later, in March 1998, the Brown family followed up with police after finding out that Harris had posted instructions for building pipe bombs on a separate website. It was later revealed in 2001 that, based on accounts from the Brown family and a report of an unexploded plastic pipe bomb found on a bike path approximately two miles from Columbine High School, Sheriff's detective Mike Guerra drafted an affidavit in April 1998 for a search warrant to be executed on the Harris household; however, the warrant was never submitted to a judge.

==== Burglary arrest and diversion ====
On the night of January 30, 1998, Harris and Klebold broke into a parked van in a lot at Deer Creek Canyon Park and stole electronic equipment. Jefferson County Sheriff's Deputy Tim Walsh later noticed the two parked farther down the road near a park entrance. Because the park was closed at that time of night, Walsh approached them to investigate, and announced his presence as one of the boys prepared to move the stolen items into the trunk of Harris's car. After both were questioned about the origin of the equipment, Harris confessed to the theft.

The two soon pleaded guilty to criminal mischief, breaking and entering, trespassing, and theft. They were sentenced to participate in a diversion program that included victim restitution, community service, anger-management classes, and counseling in exchange for the future expungement of their criminal records. During their March 1998 diversion intake, both Harris and Klebold were described as cooperative and left favorable impressions on juvenile officers. On a form asking them to identify self-behavioral issues, Harris checked fourteen boxes, among them "anger", "depression", "suicidal thoughts", and "homicidal thoughts", while Klebold selected just two, "finances" and "jobs".

According to his mother, Klebold attempted to justify the burglary by stating that the crime "was not against a person," but rather "a company," and that the incident was the reason "why people have insurance." Similarly, in a personal journal entry dated April 12, 1998, Harris wrote, "Isn't america supposed to be the land of the free? how come, If im free, I cant deprive some fucking dumbshit from his possessions If he leaves them sitting in the front seat of his fucking van in plain sight in the middle of fucking nowhere on a fri-fucking-day night? Natural selection. Fucker should be shot." Despite this entry, he submitted a letter that same month to the owner of the van, expressing regret for his actions. However, he also bragged about the robbery and sought to justify it in his personal diary.

=== Senior year ===
==== Months prior to the attack ====
Harris and Klebold worked as cooks at a Blackjack Pizza located about a mile south of Columbine High School, with Harris being a shift manager. On February 3, 1999, the two were discharged from the diversion program several months ahead of schedule for good behavior. In the final termination report, their case officer described both as "bright" young men, characterizing Harris as "likely to succeed in life as long as he stays on task and remains motivated", while stating Klebold was "intelligent enough to make any dream a reality, but needs to understand hard work is part of it".

Klebold was accepted to several colleges for computer science. After enrolling at the University of Arizona for the 2000 academic year, Klebold and his parents visited Tucson in late March 1999 to tour the campus and secure a dormitory room. Harris, meanwhile, applied to join the United States Marine Corps but was informally rejected on April 15, 1999, due to his use of fluvoxamine, an SSRI antidepressant prescribed as part of court-ordered anger-management therapy.

On April 17, 1999, Klebold attended Columbine High School's senior prom with a group of students that included his date, Robyn Anderson, and his close friend, Nate Dykeman. Harris had invited a girl to his house that night and later joined Klebold and the group at the prom afterparty. While there, Klebold scheduled plans with Devon Adams and another friend to see The Matrix at a movie theater on the evening of Wednesday, April 21. Numerous accounts indicate that Harris and Klebold appeared happy and looked forward to having plans beyond graduation.

== Gathering materials ==
=== Planning ===
==== Writings ====
Harris began keeping a journal in April 1998, shortly after he and Klebold were charged with breaking into the van. Their journals indicate that they began formulating plans around that time under the codename "NBK", a reference to the 1994 film Natural Born Killers, which was reportedly a favorite of the two.

Klebold had already begun writing by that time; his journal was titled A Virtual Book: EXISTENCES. In his first journal entry, written at age 15 and dated March 31, 1997, he wrote about his feelings of depression and suicidal ideation. In subsequent writings, Klebold often wrote about his view that he and Harris were "god-like" and more highly evolved than other human beings, though his private journal also documented self-loathing and suicidal thoughts. Many pages were covered with drawings of hearts, reflecting his unreciprocated feelings for a fellow Columbine student. In an entry dated November 3, 1997, approximately a year and a half before the massacre, Klebold first referenced the idea of going on a shooting spree, but with the assistance of his romantic interest.

Harris and Klebold wrote more about how they would carry out the massacre than why. Klebold drafted a rough outline of plans, with another slightly different version found in a journal in Harris's bedroom. In a computer entry, Harris referenced the Oklahoma City bombing, expressing a desire to surpass it by causing the most deaths ever recorded in a single event and leaving a lasting impression on the world. Considerable speculation surrounded the date chosen for the attack. The original intended date was likely April 19, the anniversary of both the Oklahoma City bombing and the Waco siege, but Harris had requested additional ammunition from Mark Manes, who did not deliver it until the evening of that day.

==== Violence in school assignments ====
For a December 1998 economics class project requiring Harris to create a business service advertisement, he and Klebold produced a video titled Hitmen for Hire, which was released publicly in February 2004. The video depicts them as contract killers extorting money in exchange for protecting weaker "preps" from bullies. The video has been described as resembling a dress rehearsal, showing the two walking through school hallways and shooting at students outside with fake guns.

Both additionally displayed themes of violence in their in-class writing projects. In December 1997, Harris wrote a paper on school shootings titled "Guns in School", and later a poem from the perspective of a bullet. In January 1999, he wrote a Doom-based first-person shooter story, prompting his teacher to remark, "Yours is a unique approach and your writing works in a gruesome way—good details and mood setting." The next month, Klebold submitted an English paper describing a tall, left-handed man dressed in a trench coat, hat, and boots, who kills nine "college preps" with automatic pistols and explosives. The unnamed character appeared to reflect Klebold's own physical traits and foreshadowed his later involvement in the massacre. When teacher Judith Kelly confronted him about the violent content, Klebold replied, "It's just a story." The paper was reported to Klebold's counselor and discussed with his parents during a teacher-parent conference, but no further action was taken.

==== Firearms ====
Harris and Klebold were unable to legally purchase guns because both were underage at the time. In November 1998, Klebold enlisted his future prom date, Robyn Anderson, who was 18 at the time, to make a straw purchase of two shotguns and a Hi-Point carbine. No charges were filed against Anderson in exchange for her cooperation with the investigation following the shootings. After illegally acquiring the weapons, Klebold sawed off his Savage 311-D 12-gauge double-barrel shotgun, reducing its overall length to approximately 23 inches (580 mm), while Harris's Savage-Springfield 12-gauge pump shotgun was shortened to around 26 inches (660 mm).

Klebold also purchased a TEC-DC9 semi-automatic handgun with a complex ownership history. The manufacturer of the gun first sold it to Miami-based Navegar Incorporated, which then sold it in 1994 to Zander's Sporting Goods in Baldwin, Illinois. The gun was subsequently sold to firearms dealer Larry Russell in Thornton, Colorado. In violation of federal law, Russell failed to maintain records of the sale, yet he determined that the purchaser was at least twenty-one years of age. Two men, Mark Manes and Philip Duran, were later convicted of supplying weapons to Harris and Klebold.

==== Explosives ====
The bombs used by the pair varied and were crudely made from carbon dioxide canisters, galvanized pipe, and metal propane tanks. The CO_{2} and pipe bombs were primed with matches placed at one end of their fuses. Both had match strikers cut from matchboxes taped to their sleeves so that when they rubbed it against the bomb, the match head lit the fuse. The weekend before the shootings, Harris and Klebold had purchased propane tanks and other supplies from a hardware store for a few hundred dollars. Several residents of the area claimed to have heard glass breaking and buzzing sounds from the Harris family's garage, which later was concluded to indicate they were constructing pipe bombs.

More complex bombs, such as the diversion that detonated on the corner of South Wadsworth Boulevard and Ken Caryl Avenue during the massacre, had timers. The two largest bombs built were found in the school cafeteria and were made from small propane tanks. Only one of these bombs went off, only partially detonating. It was estimated that if any of the bombs placed in the cafeteria had detonated properly, the blast could have caused extensive structural damage to the school and resulted in hundreds of casualties.

== Massacre ==
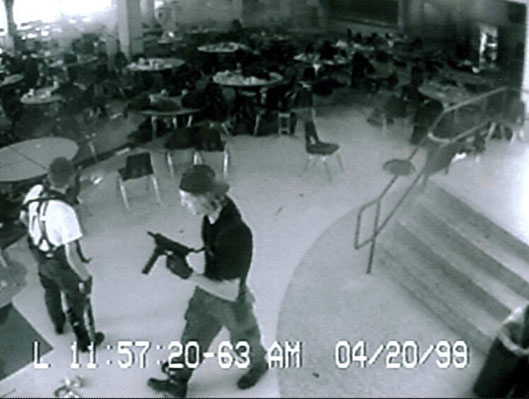
Harris (left) and Klebold (right) on a surveillance camera on the day of the shooting

Tuesday, April 20, 1999 marked less than five weeks before the senior class was scheduled to graduate. That day, neither Harris nor Klebold were marked present during a 6 a.m. bowling class at the Belleview AMF lanes in nearby Englewood. Later that morning, the two arrived at the school and placed a pair of duffel bags in the cafeteria sometime before 11:00 a.m. Each bag contained 20-pound propane bombs, set to detonate during the "A" lunch shift, which was scheduled to begin at 11:15 a.m. In the interim, the two returned to Harris's house to change into tactical gear and record a final death note.

At roughly 11:10 a.m, Brooks Brown, who was smoking during lunch break, saw Harris pulling into the school's junior parking lot. The two had reconciled from their series of prior disputes just a few months before the shooting, reportedly at Klebold's urging, and had eaten at a McDonald's with other classmates for lunch the day before, on April 19. Brown approached Harris and jokingly scolded him for skipping a morning test, noting that Harris was usually serious about schoolwork and punctuality. Harris replied, "It doesn't matter anymore," and added seconds later, "Brooks, I like you now. Get out of here. Go home." Feeling uneasy and already prepared to skip his next class, Brown drifted off the school grounds. At 11:19 a.m., having walked some distance away from the school, he heard the first gunshots and quickly reported the encounter to the police via a neighbor's cell phone.

Harris and Klebold's plan called for the bombs to detonate while Harris and Klebold waited at their cars, shooting, stabbing, and throwing additional explosives at survivors of the initial attack as they ran out of the school. At noon, this would have been followed up by bombs placed in their personal cars detonating, intended to kill first responders and others on scene. When the devices failed to detonate, Harris and Klebold entered the school and began shooting classmates and teachers. At 11:29 a.m., Harris and Klebold entered the library, where ten deaths occurred. Of the 56 library hostages, 34 remained unharmed and were able to escape after Harris and Klebold initially left the library area. Investigators later determined the shooters had enough ammunition to have killed all of the hostages.

Harris was responsible for nine of the fourteen confirmed deaths—Rachel Scott, Daniel Rohrbough, Anne Marie Hochhalter, (Note: Initially left paraplegic and eventually died from her injuries in 2025.) teacher Dave Sanders, Steven Curnow, Cassie Bernall, Isaiah Shoels, Kelly Fleming, and Daniel Mauser, while Klebold was responsible for the remaining five victims: Kyle Velasquez, Matthew Kechter, Lauren Townsend, John Tomlin, and Corey DePooter. Twenty-three others were injured, 20 by the shooters, most in critical condition.

=== Suicide ===
At 12:02 p.m., nearly an hour after their initial shooting spree, which had up to that point resulted in the deaths of 12 students, one teacher fatally wounded, and 24 other students and staff injured, Harris and Klebold returned to the library from walking through the school halls. They are believed to have returned to observe the detonation of their car bombs, which had been set to explode at noon; the devices failed to detonate. Harris and Klebold then fired at police from the west windows, though no one was injured in the exchange. Three to six minutes later, they approached the bookshelves near a table holding Patrick Ireland, who was severely wounded and intermittently conscious, and Lisa Kreutz, a student injured earlier in the library, who was unable to move.

By 12:08 p.m., Harris and Klebold had killed themselves. In a subsequent interview, Kreutz recalled hearing a comment such as, "You in the library", around this time. Harris sat down with his back to a bookshelf and fired his shotgun through the roof of his mouth, while Klebold went down on his knees and shot himself in the left temple with his TEC-9. Just before shooting himself, Klebold lit a Molotov cocktail on a nearby table, beneath which Ireland was lying, causing the tabletop to momentarily catch fire. Beneath the scorched film of material on the cocktail was a piece of Harris' brain matter, suggesting that he had already died prior to Klebold. Their bodies were found at about 3:30 p.m., and cleared for explosives. By 6:15, officials had found a bomb in Klebold's car in the parking lot, set to detonate the gas tank, but a bomb squad disarmed it. Klebold's car was repaired and, in 2006, put up for auction.

==== Immediate aftermath ====
Harris and Klebold's bodies were sent to the Jefferson County's Coroner Office on the evening of April 21 for further examination. Autopsies were conducted the next day, and the cause of death for both was ruled as suicide. On April 24, Klebold was cremated following a short funeral service for family members and friends. According to the 2023 book Homegrown by Jeffrey Toobin, Harris was also cremated, and his ashes were kept in an evidence locker in the office of Denver-based private investigator H. Ellis Armistead.

There was swift controversy over whether Harris and Klebold should be memorialized. Some opposed such memorials, arguing that they would glorify the perpetrators, while others contended that Harris and Klebold were also victims. On April 27, master carpenter Greg Zanis erected fifteen large wooden crosses atop a hill near Columbine High School to commemorate those who had died, including the shooters. The site became a focal point for mourning within the community, with over 125,000 people visiting over the following days and leaving expressions of sympathy at the base of the crosses, including some directed towards Harris and Klebold. However, on April 30, the father of victim Daniel Rohrbough cut down the crosses bearing the perpetrators' names in the presence of media, stating that they should not be memorialized in the same place as the victims.

For nearly nineteen years, the Columbine High School massacre remained the deadliest high school shooting in United States history until it was surpassed by the Stoneman Douglas High School shooting in Parkland, Florida, on February 14, 2018.

== Suggested rationales ==
President Clinton's remarks regarding the shooting, April 20, 1999

President Clinton's speech to the Columbine High School community, May 20, 1999

=== Media accounts ===
==== Trenchcoat Mafia ====
Harris and Klebold were initially reported to be members of a clique called the "Trenchcoat Mafia", a name given by jocks to describe those who wore black trench coats and rebelled against the school hierarchy. Harris's father erroneously stated in a 9-1-1 call he made on the day of the shooting that his son was "a member of what they call the 'Trenchcoat Mafia'". It was later confirmed that the pair had little to no connection with the group, nor did they appear in the group's photo for Columbine's 1998 yearbook, but that they were friends with some of its members. (Note: They did not appear in a group photo of the Trench Coat Mafia in the yearbook. However, Harris's father stated that his son was "a member of what they call the Trench Coat Mafia" in the 9-1-1 call he made on April 20, 1999.) Most of the primary members of the "Trenchcoat Mafia" had left the school by the time Harris and Klebold committed the massacre; none were considered suspects in the shootings or were charged with any involvement in the attack.

==== Music ====
Marilyn Manson was blamed by the media in the wake of the Columbine shooting, and responded to criticism in a 2001 interview with Michael Moore, in which he was asked, "If you were to talk directly to the kids at Columbine and the people in the community, what would you say to them if they were here right now?", to which he replied, "I wouldn't say a single word to them—I would listen to what they have to say, and that's what no one did", referring to people ignoring red flags that rose from Harris and Klebold prior to the shooting.

Two German industrial bands, KMFDM and Rammstein, received heavy scrutiny for perceived themes of aggression and fascism following the attacks, as both Harris and Klebold were fans. It was revealed that Harris had a large Rammstein sticker on the back of his car and regularly wore the band's merchandise, while also uploading lyrics of KMFDM songs ("Son of a Gun", "Stray Bullet" and "Waste") to his website. Additionally, the date of the massacre, April 20, 1999, coincided with the release date of the KMFDM album Adios. Harris noted the coincidence of the album's title and April release date in his journal. In response, frontman Sascha Konietzko issued a statement rebuking the attacks and affirming that KMFDM was "against war, oppression, fascism and violence against others" and "none of us condone any Nazi beliefs whatsoever".

==== Nazism ====
The attack occurred on the birthday of Adolf Hitler, which led to speculation in the media. Some people, such as Robyn Anderson, who knew the perpetrators, stated that the pair were not obsessed with Nazism nor did they worship or admire Hitler in any way. Anderson stated, in retrospect, that there were many things the pair did not tell friends. In his journal, Harris mentioned his admiration of what he imagined to be natural selection, and wrote that he would like to put everyone in a super Doom game and see to it that the weak die and the strong live. On the day of the massacre, Harris wore a white T-shirt with the words "Natural selection" printed in black.

An April 22, 1999, article in The Washington Post described Harris and Klebold:

They hated jocks, admired Nazis and scorned normalcy. They fancied themselves devotees of the Gothic subculture, even though they thrilled to the violence denounced by much of that fantasy world. They were white supremacists, but loved music by anti-racist rock bands.

Along with inaccurate reports that Harris and Klebold were members of the "Trenchcoat Mafia", early reports also incorrectly described the group as wearing swastikas on their clothing and as a cult with ties to neo-Nazism.

=== Bullying ===
Initial accounts from parents and school staff described bullying at Columbine as "rampant." Nathan Vanderau, a friend of Klebold, and Alisa Owen, Harris's eighth-grade science partner, reported that the pair were frequently targeted by other students. Vanderau noted that a "cup of fecal matter" was once thrown at them. Chad Laughlin recounted: "A lot of the tension in the school came from the [1998 senior] class above us. There were people fearful of walking by a table where you knew you didn't belong, stuff like that. Certain groups certainly got preferential treatment across the board. I caught the tail end of one really horrible incident, and I know Dylan told his mother that it was the worst day of his life." According to Laughlin, the incident involved jocks pelting Klebold with "ketchup-covered tampons." Brooks Brown supported Laughlin's account, recalling: "People surrounded them [Harris and Klebold] in the commons and squirted ketchup packets all over them, laughing at them, calling them faggots. That happened while teachers watched. They couldn't fight back. They wore the ketchup all day and went home covered with it." In his 2002 book No Easy Answers: The Truth Behind Death at Columbine, Brown also wrote that Harris's chest condition drew intense ridicule from other students.

At the end of Harris's last journal entry, he wrote: "I hate you people for leaving me out of so many fun things. And no don't fucking say, 'Well that's your fault,' because it isn't, you people had my phone number, and I asked and all, but no. No no no don't let the weird-looking Eric KID come along, ooh fucking nooo." However, in another entry by Eric in his journal, he stated that even if he were complimented and respected more by his peers, the attack would've still, in all likelihood, occurred. In another entry by Eric in his journal he says not to blame the school's administration for the attack as the staff were doing a good job running the school.

Klebold wrote in his journal about his perceived rejection, a desire to belong, and an intense contempt for others. In March 1997, he wrote, "I do shit to supposedly ‘cleanse’ myself in a spiritual, moral sort of way... trying not to ridicule/make fun of people ([name omitted] at school), yet it does nothing to help my life morally." Two months later he wrote, "I am GOD compared to some of those un-existable [sic] brainless zombies," referring to individuals he regarded as inferior to him. In a recorded videotape, Klebold stated, "You've been giving us shit for years. You're fucking gonna pay for all the shit! We don't give a shit. Because we're gonna die doing it." However, he and Harris also stated several times on the tapes that no one was to blame and that the attack could not have been prevented by anybody else.

Various academics and researchers have disputed the theory that bullying was the motivating factor. Jeff Kass, author of Columbine: A True Crime Story, believes that bullying wasn't the cause. Peter Langman argues against bullying being the cause of the attack; while other researchers have concurred. These dissenting authors include Dave Cullen and former principal Frank DeAngelis who denied that bullying was an issue at all at Columbine High, writing in his book that the jocks alleged to be the targets of lies and rumors and that they barely knew Harris and Klebold. Other academics dispute the bullying hypothesis as well.

=== Revenge for prior arrest ===
After their January 1998 arrest, which both had recorded in diversion as the most traumatic thing they had ever experienced, Klebold wrote a yearbook message to Harris, saying how they would have fun getting revenge and killing police, and that his "wrath" stemming from the incident would be "god-like". On the day of the massacre, Klebold wore a black T-shirt with "WRATH" printed in red. It was speculated that revenge for the arrest was a possible motive for the attack, and that the pair planned on having a massive gun battle with police during the shooting. Klebold wrote, "life was no fun without a little death", and that he would like to spend the last moments of his life in "nerve-wracking twists of murder and bloodshed." He concluded by saying that he would kill himself afterward in order to leave the world that he hated and go to a better place.

Some of the home-recorded videos filmed between March 15, 1999, and the morning to the attack are popularly known as the "Basement Tapes". In these videos, Harris and Klebold discuss their motives for the shooting and provide instructions on bomb-making. Law enforcement officials have stated that the tapes were withheld to prevent them from becoming "call-to-arms" and "how-to" materials that could inspire copycat attacks. Others have argued that releasing the tapes could assist psychologists in studying them, potentially helping to identify characteristics associated with future perpetrators.

=== Behavioral analysis ===
==== Mental disorders ====
Although early media reports attributed the shootings to a desire for revenge on the part of Harris and Klebold for bullying that they received, subsequent psychological analysis indicated Harris and Klebold harbored serious psychological problems. According to Supervisory Special Agent Dwayne Fuselier, the FBI's lead Columbine investigator and a clinical psychologist, Harris exhibited a pattern of grandiosity, contempt, and lack of empathy or remorse, distinctive traits of psychopaths that he concealed through deception. Fuselier adds that Harris engaged in mendacity not merely to protect himself, as Harris rationalized in his journal, but also for pleasure, as seen when Harris expressed his thoughts in his journal regarding how he and Klebold avoided prosecution for breaking into a van. Other leading psychiatrists concur that Harris was a psychopath, though postmortem diagnoses of mental illness remain controversial and disputed.

According to psychologist Peter Langman, Klebold displayed signs of schizotypal personality disorder – he struck many people as odd due to his shy nature, appeared to have had disturbed thought processes and constantly misused language in unusual ways as evidenced by his journal. He appeared to have been delusional, viewed himself as "god-like", and wrote that he was "made a human without the possibility of BEING human." He was also convinced that others hated him and felt like he was being conspired against, even though according to many reports, Klebold was loved by his family and friends.

==== Psychiatric evaluations ====
Harris took the drug fluvoxamine, an SSRI antidepressant, as part of court-ordered anger management therapy stemming from his 1998 arrest. Although some friends of Harris suggested that he had stopped taking the drug before the massacre, his autopsy reports showed low therapeutic or normal (non-toxic) blood levels of fluvoxamine in his system—approximately 0.0031 to 0.0087 mg/mL—at the time of his death. After the shootings, opponents of contemporary psychiatry, such as Peter Breggin, claimed that the psychiatric medications prescribed to Harris after his conviction may have exacerbated his aggressiveness.

== Lawsuits ==
On April 19, 2001, the families of more than 30 victims received shares in a $2,538,000 settlement from the families of the perpetrators and the two men convicted of supplying the weapons used in the massacre. The Harris and Klebold parents contributed $1,568,000 to the settlement from their homeowners insurance policies, Mark Manes contributed $720,000, and Philip Duran contributed $250,000. The Harrises and the Klebolds were additionally ordered to guarantee an additional $32,000 for any future claims, while Manes was ordered to hold $80,000 and Duran $50,000 for the same purpose.

One family had filed a $250-million lawsuit against the Harrises and Klebolds in 1999 and did not accept the 2001 settlement. In June 2003, a judge ordered the family to accept a $366,000 settlement. Two months later, the families of five other victims received undisclosed settlements from the Harrises and Klebolds.

In October 2001, five Columbine families sued Solvay Pharmaceuticals, the manufacturer of Fluvoxamine, under the claim that the drug pushed Harris to become homicidal and psychotic. By October 2002, all but one of the original plaintiffs dropped the suit; only survivor Mark Taylor remained. In February 2003, Taylor settled after Solvay agreed to donate $10,000 to the American Cancer Society.

== Legacy ==
=== Influence in popular culture ===
ITV describes the legacy of Harris and Klebold as deadly, noting that they have inspired several instances of mass killings in the United States and abroad. CNN describes that the duo as having left a lasting mark on pop culture, while the Napa Valley Register has called them "cultural icons". Dave Cullen, the author of Columbine, described Harris and Klebold as the creators of a movement for disenfranchised youth.

=== Copycat shootings ===
According to psychiatrist E. Fuller Torrey of the Treatment Advocacy Center, a legacy of the Columbine shootings is its "allure to disaffected youth". As a result, it has influenced several subsequent school shootings, with the perpetrators of these attacks praising Harris and Klebold. Seung-Hui Cho, who committed the Virginia Tech shooting in April 2007, referred to the duo as "martyrs". In February 2008, Steven Kazmierczak committed the 2008 Northern Illinois University shooting; investigations and acquaintances spoke of his obsessions, which included Harris and Klebold, especially their "ability to create chaos with the propane tank bombs." Natalie Rupnow, who in December 2024 carried out the Abundant Life Christian School shooting in Madison, Wisconsin, posted photos of herself wearing a KMFDM shirt similar to Harris', as well as writing about her admiration of both shooters in her "manifesto" and reportedly referencing them in posts from social media accounts tied to her.

Sociologist Ralph Larkin examined twelve major school shootings in the US in the up to 2008 and found that in eight of them, perpetrators made explicit reference to Harris and Klebold. Larkin wrote that the Columbine massacre established a "script" for shootings: "Numerous post-Columbine rampage shooters referred directly to Columbine as their inspiration; others attempted to supersede the Columbine shootings in body count." A 2015 investigation by CNN identified "more than 40 people... charged with Columbine-style plots," while an investigation by ABC News identified "at least 17 attacks and another 36 alleged plots or serious threats against schools since the assault on Columbine High School that can be tied to the 1999 massacre." Ties identified by ABC News included online research by the perpetrators into the Columbine shooting, clipping news coverage and images of Columbine, explicit statements of admiration of Harris and Klebold, such as writings in journals and on social media, in video posts, (Note: In 2012, sociologist Nathalie E. Paton of the National Center for Scientific Research in Paris analyzed the videos created by post-Columbine school shooting perpetrators. A recurring set of motifs was found, including explicit statements of admiration and identification with previous perpetrators. Paton said the videos serve the perpetrators by distinguishing themselves from their classmates and associating themselves with the previous perpetrators.) and in police interviews, timing planned to an anniversary of Columbine, plans to exceed the Columbine victim counts, and other ties. 60 mass shootings have been carried out, where the perpetrators had made at least a single reference to Harris and Klebold.

Writing for The New Yorker, Canadian journalist Malcolm Gladwell proposed a threshold model of school shootings in which Harris and Klebold were the triggering actors in "a slow-motion, ever-evolving riot, in which each new participant's action makes sense in reaction to and in combination with those who came before." In some cases, threats of a repeat attack has led to the closure of entire school districts.

=== Fandom ===
Harris and Klebold have also spawned a fandom that calls itself "Columbiners", primarily active on the blogging site Tumblr. While some members express a scholarly interest in the pair or the events, the majority, mostly young women, express a sympathetic or, at times, sexual interest, in Harris and Klebold. The fandom has produced homoerotic art of the two, fan fiction imaging their lives had the shooting not occurred, and costumes replicating the outfits Harris and Klebold wore on the day of the attacks. According to the news site All That's Interesting, "Many of these 'Columbiners' have no positive feelings about the massacre, but are instead focused on the troubled inner lives of its perpetrators because they see themselves in them." The fandom has received intense criticism for glorifying Harris and Klebold and for allegedly inspiring shooting plots, such as the Halifax mass shooting plot.

=== Media about the duo ===
==== Documentaries ====
The documentary film Bowling for Columbine, directed by Michael Moore and released in 2002, focuses on a perceived American obsession with guns, their affect in schools, and their role in the shooting. The film also features interviews with several survivors of the attack as well as people who knew the perpetrators. In 2004, the shooting was dramatized in the History Channel documentary series Zero Hour, with the episode airing on September 12.

==== Movies ====
In the 2002 Ben Coccio film Zero Day, which was inspired by the Columbine shooting, two shooters are played by Andre Keuck and Cal Robertson and called "Andre and Calvin" after their actors.

The 2003 Gus Van Sant film Elephant depicts a fictional school shooting, some of whose details were based on the Columbine massacre, such as one scene in which one of the young killers walks into the evacuated school cafeteria and pauses to take a sip from a drink left behind, as Harris did during the shooting. In the film, the killers are called "Alex and Eric" after the actors who portray them, Alex Frost and Eric Deulen.

The 2016 biographical film I'm Not Ashamed, based on the journals of Rachel Scott, includes glimpses of Harris's and Klebold's lives and of interactions between them and other students at Columbine High School. Harris is played by David Errigo Jr. and Klebold is played by Cory Chapman.

==== Video games ====
On the sixth anniversary of the massacre, game designer Danny Ledonne released a role-playing video game entitled Super Columbine Massacre RPG!, in which the player assumes the roles of Harris and Klebold as school shooters. The game received substantial media backlash for allegedly glorifying the pair's actions. The father of one victim told the press, "It [the game] disgusts me. You trivialize the actions of two murderers and the lives of the innocent."

=== Reaction of Sue Klebold ===
Sue Klebold, the mother of Dylan, was initially in denial about her son's involvement in the massacre, believing, among other things, that he had been manipulated by Harris. However, after viewing the "Basement Tapes" in October 1999, she came to terms with Dylan's role in the attacks. Ten years later, she spoke publicly about the Columbine High School massacre for the first time in an essay published in the October 2009 issue of O: The Oprah Magazine. In the piece, Klebold wrote, "For the rest of my life, I will be haunted by the horror and anguish Dylan caused", and, "Dylan changed everything I believed about myself, about God, about family, and about love." Stating that she had no knowledge of her son's intentions, she said, "Once I saw his journals, it was clear to me that Dylan entered the school with the intention of dying there." In Andrew Solomon's 2012 book Far from the Tree, Klebold acknowledged that during the massacre, when she discovered that Klebold was one of the shooters, she prayed that he would die before harming others: "I had a sudden vision of what he might be doing. And so while every other mother in Littleton was praying that her child was safe, I had to pray that mine would die before he hurt anyone else."

In February 2016, Klebold published a memoir titled A Mother's Reckoning, recounting her experiences before and after the massacre. It was co-written by Laura Tucker and included an introduction by Andrew Solomon. It received favorable reviews, including from the New York Times Book Review, and peaked at number two on The New York Times Best Seller list. That same month, Klebold's first televised interview with Diane Sawyer aired as a 20/20 special on ABC News. She told Sawyer, "I think we like to believe that our love and our understanding is protective, and that 'if anything were wrong with my kids, I would know,' but I didn't know, and I wasn't able to stop [Dylan] from hurting other people. I wasn't able to stop his hurting himself and it's very hard to live with that." She also stated, "If I had recognized that Dylan was experiencing some real mental distress, he would not have been [at Columbine]. He would have gotten help."

On February 2, 2017, Klebold delivered a speech at a TED Talk titled, "My son was a Columbine shooter. This is my story." As of February 2026, the talk has been viewed more than 26 million times on YouTube and the official TED website. In July 2021, Klebold appeared on an episode of the BBC documentary series Storyville, alongside other American parents whose children had committed school shootings.

== See also ==
- God complex
- List of attacks related to secondary schools
- List of school shootings in the United States

== Bibliography ==
- Brown, Brooks; Merritt, Rob (2002). No Easy Answers: The Truth Behind Death at Columbine. Lantern Books. ISBN 1-59056-031-0.
- Cullen, Dave (2009). Columbine. TwelveBooks. ISBN 978-0-446-54693-5.
- Daggett, Chelsea (November 2015). "Eric Harris and Dylan Klebold: Antiheroes for outcasts" (PDF). Participations: Journal of Audience & Reception Studies. 12 (2). ISSN 1749-8716. Archived from the original (PDF) on June 6, 2020.
- Kass, Jeff (2009). Columbine: A True Crime Story. Conundrum Press. ISBN 978-1-938633-26-3.
- Larkin, Ralph W. (2007). Comprehending Columbine. Temple University Press. ISBN 978-1-59213-491-5.
- Rico, Andrew Ryan (September 1, 2015). "Fans of Columbine shooters Eric Harris and Dylan Klebold". Transformative Works and Cultures. 20. doi:10.3983/twc.2015.0671.
