= Toobin =

Toobin may refer to:

- Jeffrey Toobin (born 1960), American legal analyst
- Jerome Toobin (1919–1984), American television producer and father of Jeffrey
- Toobin', a 1988 arcade game by Atari and later ported to many other platforms

== See also ==
- Toobing or tubing
