= David Souter =

American lawyer and jurist (1939–2025)

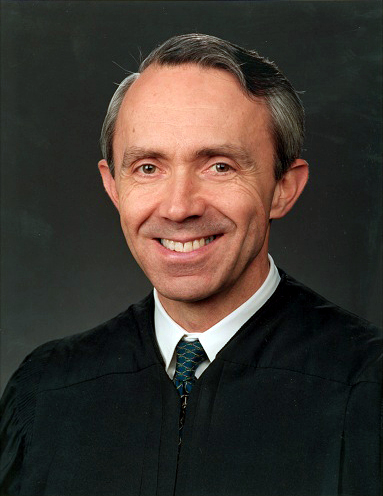
- Official portrait, 1990

Associate Justice of the Supreme Court of the United States
- In office October 9, 1990 – June 29, 2009
- Nominated by: George H. W. Bush
- Preceded by: William J. Brennan Jr.
- Succeeded by: Sonia Sotomayor

Judge of the United States Court of Appeals for the First Circuit
- In office May 25, 1990 – October 9, 1990
- Nominated by: George H. W. Bush
- Preceded by: Hugh H. Bownes
- Succeeded by: Norman H. Stahl

Associate Justice of the New Hampshire Supreme Court
- In office 1983–1990
- Nominated by: John Sununu
- Preceded by: Maurice Bois
- Succeeded by: Sherman Horton

20th Attorney General of New Hampshire
- In office July 17, 1976 – September 19, 1978
- Governor: Meldrim Thomson Jr.
- Preceded by: Warren Rudman
- Succeeded by: Thomas D. Rath

Personal details
- Born: David Hackett Souter; September 17, 1939 Melrose, Massachusetts, U.S.
- Died: May 8, 2025 (aged 85) Hopkinton, New Hampshire, U.S.
- Party: Republican
- Education: Harvard University (BA, LLB); Magdalen College, Oxford (MA)
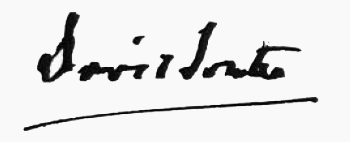
- Signature
- Souter's voice Souter delivering the Clark v. Arizona majority opinion. Recorded June 29, 2006

David Hackett Souter (/ˈsuːtər/ SOO-tər; September 17, 1939 – May 8, 2025) was an American lawyer and jurist who served as an Associate Justice of the Supreme Court of the United States from 1990 to 2009. Appointed by President George H. W. Bush to fill the seat that had been vacated by William J. Brennan Jr., Souter was a member of both the Rehnquist and Roberts courts.

Raised in New England, Souter attended Harvard College; Magdalen College, Oxford; and Harvard Law School. After briefly working in private practice, he moved to public service. He served as a prosecutor in the office of the Attorney General of New Hampshire (1968–1976); as attorney general of New Hampshire (1976–1978); as an associate justice of the New Hampshire Superior Court (1978–1983); as an associate justice of the New Hampshire Supreme Court (1983–1990); and as a judge of the United States Court of Appeals for the First Circuit (1990).

In mid-2009, after Barack Obama took office as U.S. president, Souter announced his retirement from the Court; he was succeeded by Sonia Sotomayor. Souter continued to hear cases by designation at the circuit court level.

== Early life and education ==
Souter was born in Melrose, Massachusetts, on September 17, 1939, the only child of Joseph Alexander Souter and Helen Adams (Hackett) Souter. At age 11, he moved with his family to their farm in Weare, New Hampshire.

Souter graduated second in his class from Concord High School in 1957. He then attended Harvard University, graduating in 1961 with a Bachelor of Arts, magna cum laude, in philosophy and writing a senior thesis on the legal positivism of Supreme Court Justice Oliver Wendell Holmes Jr. While at Harvard, Souter was inducted into Phi Beta Kappa. He was selected as a Rhodes Scholar and earned a Bachelor of Arts degree (later promoted to a Master of Arts degree, as per tradition) in Jurisprudence from Magdalen College, Oxford, in 1963. He graduated in 1966 with a Bachelor of Laws degree from Harvard Law School.

== Early career ==
In 1968, after two years as an associate at the law firm of Orr & Reno in Concord, New Hampshire, Souter began his career in public service by accepting a position as an assistant attorney general of New Hampshire. In 1971, Warren Rudman, then the attorney general of New Hampshire, selected Souter as deputy attorney general. Souter succeeded Rudman as New Hampshire attorney general in 1976.

In 1978, Souter was named an associate justice of the New Hampshire Superior Court. With four years of trial court experience, Souter was appointed to the New Hampshire Supreme Court as an associate justice in 1983.

Shortly after George H. W. Bush was sworn in as president, he nominated Souter to a seat on the United States Court of Appeals for the First Circuit. Souter had had seven years of judicial experience at the appellate level, four years at the trial court level, and ten years with the attorney general's office. He was confirmed by unanimous consent of the Senate on April 27, 1990.

== U.S. Supreme Court appointment ==
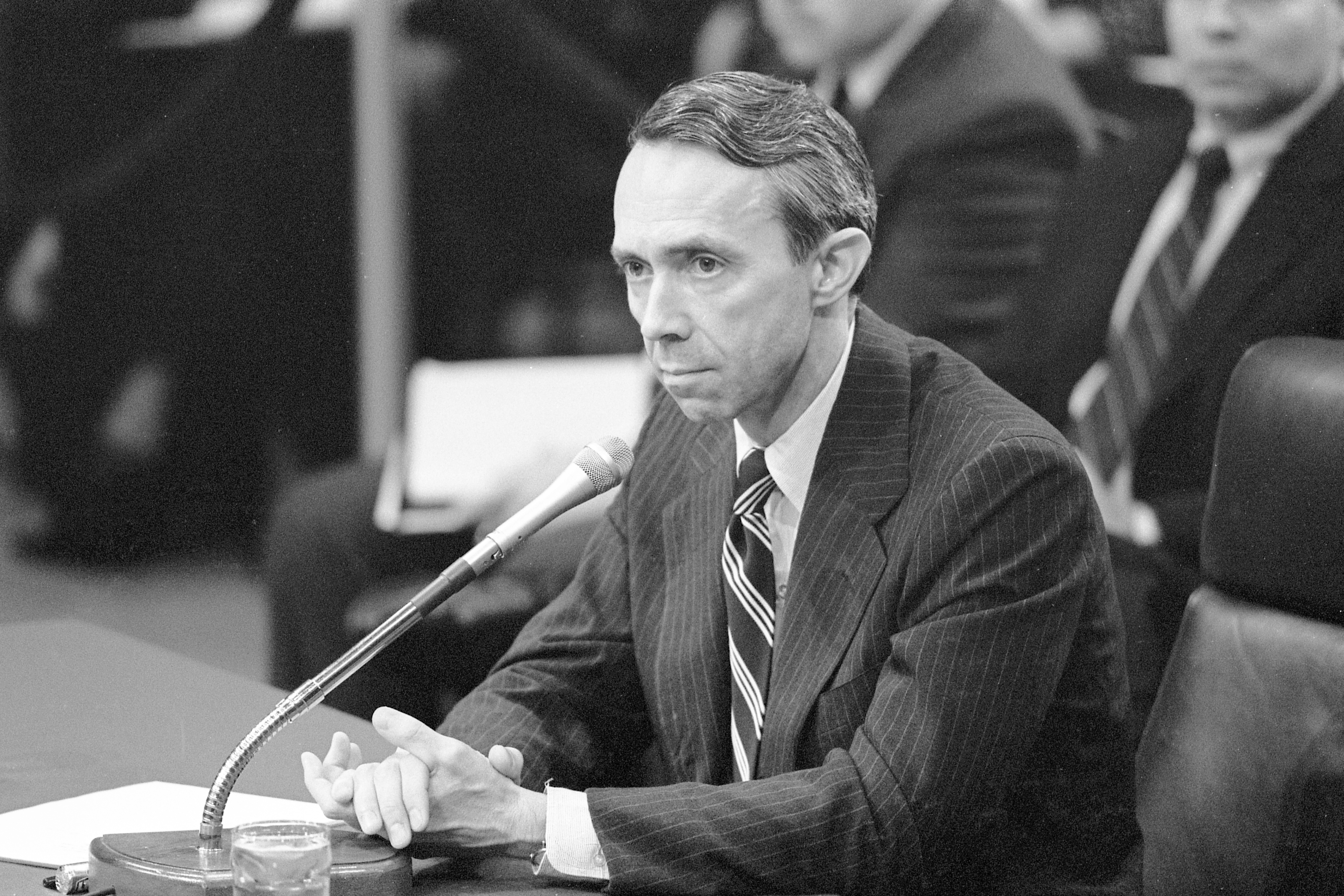
Souter testifying during one of his confirmation hearings

President George H. W. Bush initially considered nominating Clarence Thomas to Brennan's seat, but he and his advisers decided that Thomas did not yet have enough experience as a judge. Warren Rudman, who had since been elected to the U.S. Senate, and former Governor of New Hampshire John H. Sununu, then Bush's chief of staff, suggested Souter, and were instrumental in his nomination and confirmation. Bush was reportedly "highly impressed by Souter's intellectual seriousness" and Souter's intellect, "particularly impressive in one-on-one meetings", was reported to have been a persuasive factor in his nomination. At the time, few observers outside New Hampshire knew who Souter was, although he had reportedly been on Reagan's short list of nominees for the Supreme Court seat held by Lewis F. Powell Jr. that eventually went to Anthony Kennedy.

Souter was seen as a "stealth justice" whose professional record in the state courts provoked no real controversy and provided a minimal "paper trail" on issues of U.S. Constitutional law. Bush saw the lack of a paper trail as an asset, because the Senate had rejected one of President Reagan's nominees, Robert Bork, partially because of his extensive written opinions on controversial issues. Bush nominated Souter on July 25, 1990, saying that he did not know Souter's stances on abortion, affirmative action, or other issues.

Senate confirmation hearings began on September 13, 1990. The National Organization for Women opposed Souter's nomination and held a rally outside the Senate during the hearings. The president of NOW, Molly Yard, testified that Souter would "end freedom for women in this country." Souter was also opposed by the NAACP, which urged its 500,000 members to write letters to their senators asking them to oppose the nomination. In Souter's opening statement before the Judiciary Committee, he summed up the lessons he had learned as a judge of the New Hampshire courts:

The first lesson, simple as it is, is that whatever court we are in, whatever we are doing, whether we are in a trial court or an appellate court, at the end of our task some human being is going to be affected. Some human life is going to be changed in some way by what we do, whether we do it as trial judges or whether we do it as appellate judges, as far removed from the trial arena as it is possible to be. And so we had better use every power of our minds and our hearts and our beings to get those rulings right.

Some have pointed to Souter's confirmation hearings as showing the first signs of the liberal bent of his legal principles. He surprised many conservatives when, prompted by Senator Chuck Grassley to describe his views on "judicial activism" and "government by the judiciary", he responded, "Courts must accept their own responsibility for making a just society." He added that the court was obligated to respond to pressing social concerns that were addressed by the Constitution but which other branches of government had failed to take up.

Despite organized opposition by numerous civil society groups, Souter won confirmation easily, with all votes in opposition coming from Democrats. His performance at the confirmation hearings ensured his approval by the Senate; Walter Dellinger, a liberal Democrat and an adviser to the Senate Judiciary Committee, called Souter "the most intellectually impressive nominee I've ever seen". The Senate Judiciary Committee reported out the nomination by a vote of 13–1, with Ted Kennedy the lone dissenter. The full Senate confirmed the nomination on October 2, 1990, by a vote of 90–9 (Pete Wilson of California was absent due to campaigning for the state's gubernatorial election, which he won). Souter was sworn into office seven days after his confirmation.

Nine senators voted against Souter: Kennedy and John Kerry of Massachusetts; Bill Bradley and Frank Lautenberg of New Jersey; Brock Adams of Washington; Daniel Akaka of Hawaii; Quentin Burdick of North Dakota; Alan Cranston of California; and Barbara Mikulski of Maryland. They painted Souter as a right-winger in the mold of Robert Bork.

== U.S. Supreme Court ==
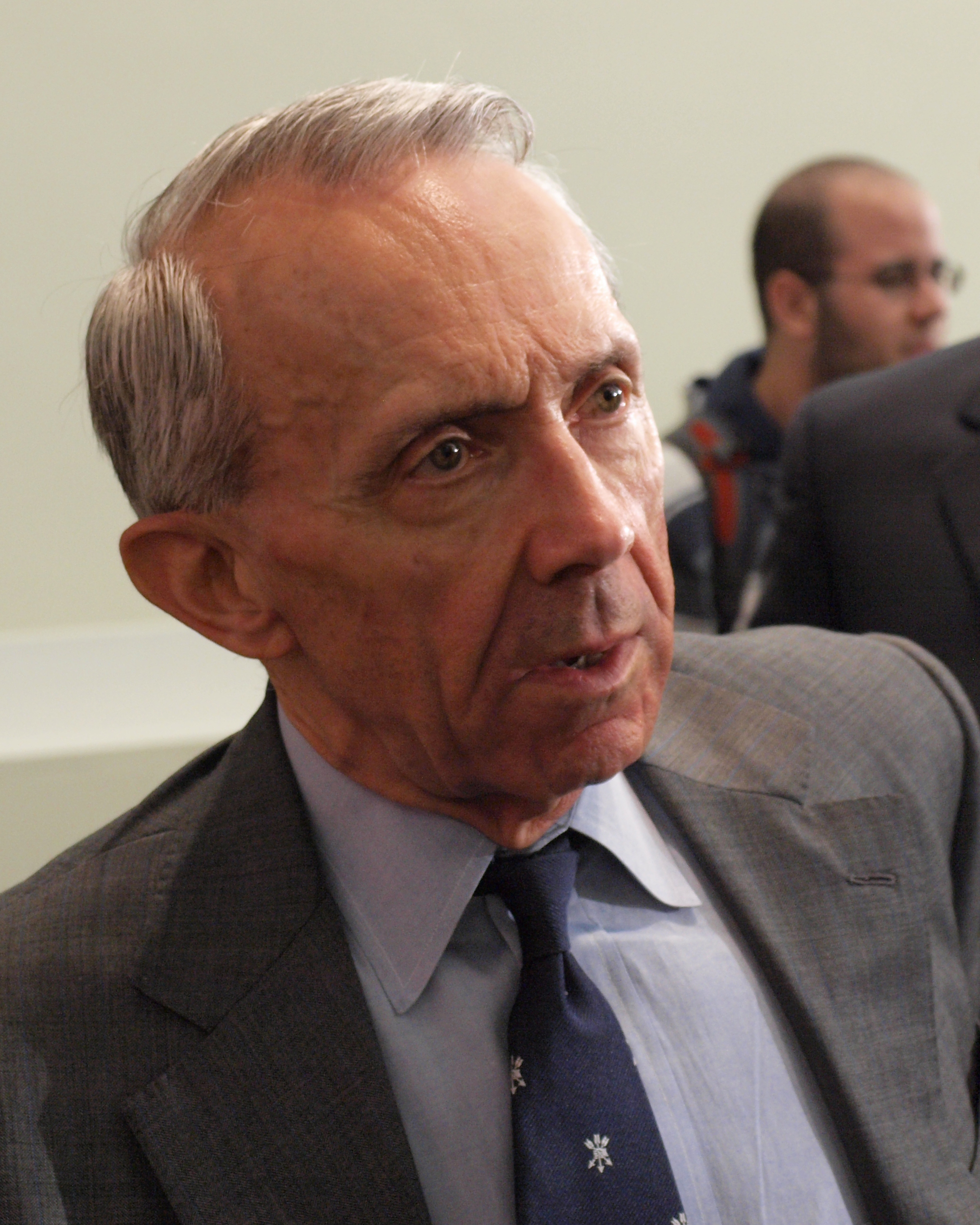
Souter in 2009

Souter opposed having cameras in the Supreme Court during oral arguments, saying the media would take questions out of context and the proceedings would be politicized.

Souter served as the Court's designated representative to Congress on at least one occasion, testifying before committees about the Court's needs for additional funding to refurbish its building and for other projects.

=== Judicial philosophy ===
At the time of Souter's appointment, John Sununu assured President Bush and conservatives that Souter would be a "home run" for conservatism. In his testimony before the Senate, Souter was thought by conservatives to be a strict constructionist on constitutional matters, but he portrayed himself as an incrementalist who disliked drastic change and attached a high importance to precedent. In the state attorney general's office and as a state Supreme Court judge, he had never been tested on matters of federal law.

After the appointment of Clarence Thomas, Souter moved toward the ideological middle. In the 1992 case Lee v. Weisman, Souter voted with the liberal wing and against allowing prayer at a high school graduation ceremony.

In the 1992 case Planned Parenthood v. Casey, Souter voted with the moderate wing in a plurality decision in which the Court reaffirmed the essential holding in Roe v. Wade but narrowed its scope. Justice Anthony Kennedy had considered overturning Roe and upholding all the restrictions at issue in Casey. Souter considered upholding all the restrictions but was uneasy about overturning Roe. After consulting with O'Connor, the three (who came to be known as "the troika") developed a joint opinion that upheld all the restrictions in Casey except the mandatory notification of a husband while asserting the essential holding of Roe, that the Constitution protects the right to an abortion.

By the late 1990s, Souter began to align himself more with Stephen Breyer and Ruth Bader Ginsburg, although as of 1995, he sided on more occasions with the more liberal justice John Paul Stevens than with either Breyer or Ginsburg, both Clinton appointees. On death penalty cases, workers' rights cases, defendants' rights cases, and other issues, Souter began increasingly voting with the Court's liberals, and later came to be considered part of the Court's liberal wing. Because of this, many conservatives view Souter's appointment as an error of the Bush presidency. For example, after widespread speculation that President George W. Bush intended to appoint Alberto Gonzales—whose perceived views on affirmative action and abortion drew criticism—to the Court, some conservative Senate staffers popularized the slogan "Gonzales is Spanish for Souter". Conversely, Ted Kennedy, one of nine senators to have voted against Souter's confirmation, later expressed regret about his vote.

A Wall Street Journal opinion piece ten years after Souter's nomination called Souter a "liberal jurist" and said that Rudman took "pride in recounting how he sold Mr. Souter to gullible White House Chief of Staff John Sununu as a confirmable conservative. Then they both sold the judge to President Bush, who wanted above all else to avoid a confirmation battle." Rudman wrote in his memoir that he had "suspected all along" that Souter would not "overturn activist liberal precedents." Sununu later said that he had "a lot of disappointment" in Souter's positions on the Court and would have preferred him to be more like Antonin Scalia. In contrast, President Bush said several years after Souter's appointment that he was proud of Souter's "outstanding" service and "outstanding intellect" and that Souter would "serve for years on the Court, and he will serve with honor always and with brilliance".

=== Notable decisions ===
==== Planned Parenthood v. Casey ====
In the 1992 case Planned Parenthood v. Casey, the Supreme Court upheld the right to abortion as established by the "essential holding" of Roe v. Wade (1973) and issued as its "key judgment" the imposition of the undue burden standard when evaluating state-imposed restrictions on that right. The controlling plurality decision in the case was joined by Souter, Kennedy and O'Connor. Souter is widely believed to have written the section of the opinion that addresses the issue of stare decisis and set out a four-part test in determining whether to overrule a prior decision. David Garrow later called that section "the most eloquent section of the opinion" and said it includes "two paragraphs that rank among the most memorable lines ever authored by an American jurist".

==== Bush v. Gore ====
In 2000, Souter voted along with three other justices in Bush v. Gore to allow the presidential election recount to continue, while the majority voted to end the recount. The decision allowed the declaration of George W. Bush as the winner of the election in Florida to stand.

In his 2007 book The Nine: Inside the Secret World of the Supreme Court, Jeffrey Toobin wrote of Souter's reaction to Bush v. Gore:

Toughened, or coarsened, by their worldly lives, the other dissenters could shrug and move on, but Souter couldn't. His whole life was being a judge. He came from a tradition where the independence of the judiciary was the foundation of the rule of law. And Souter believed Bush v. Gore mocked that tradition. His colleagues' actions were so transparently, so crudely partisan that Souter thought he might not be able to serve with them anymore. Souter seriously considered resigning. For many months, it was not at all clear whether he would remain as a justice. That the Court met in a city he loathed made the decision even harder. At the urging of a handful of close friends, he decided to stay on, but his attitude toward the Court was never the same. There were times when David Souter thought of Bush v. Gore and wept.

The above passage was disputed by Souter's longtime friend Warren Rudman. Rudman told the New Hampshire Union Leader that while Souter was discomfited by Bush v. Gore, it was not true that he had broken down into tears over it.

=== Relationship with other justices ===
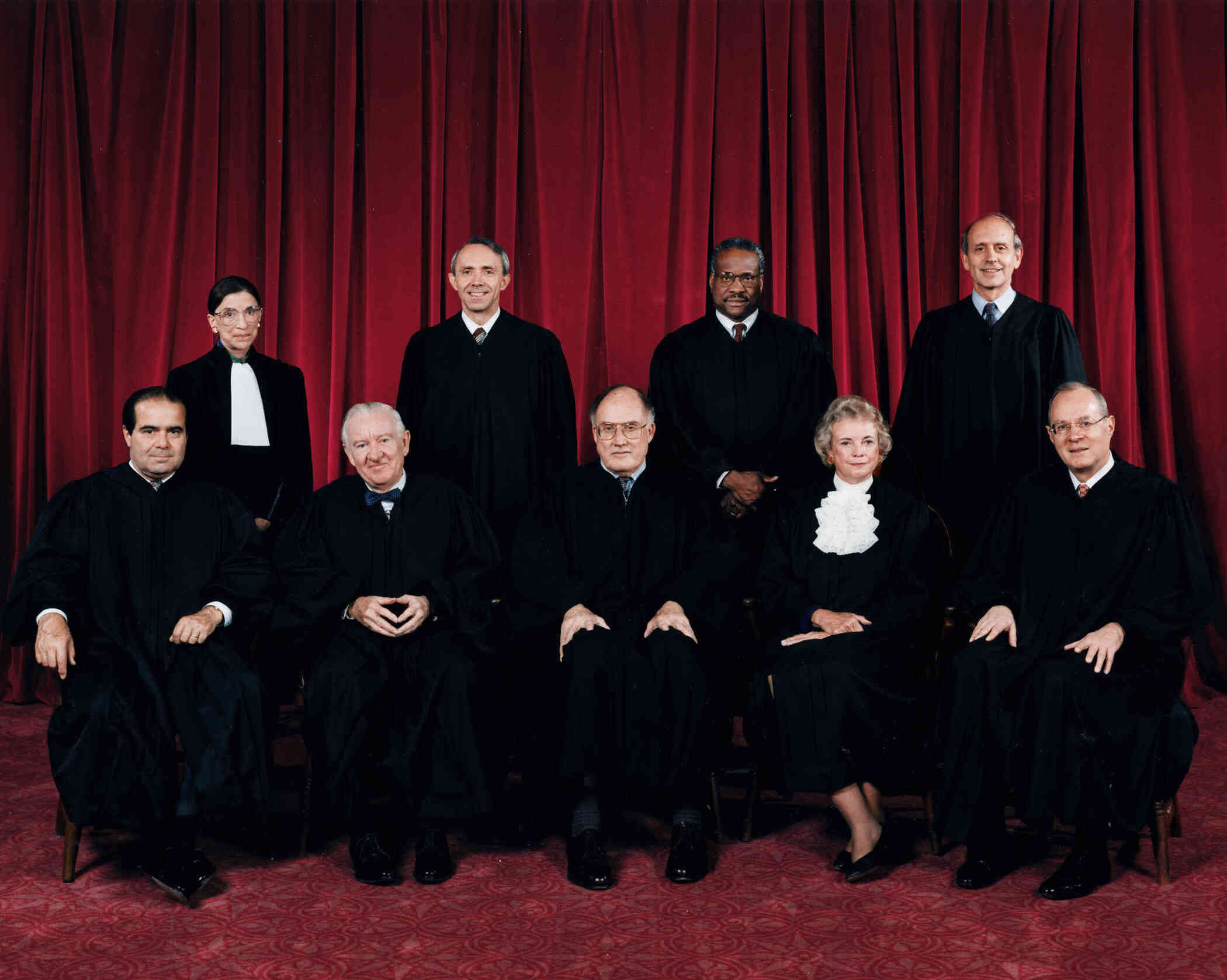
Justice Souter (second from the left in the back row) on the Rehnquist Court

Souter worked well with Sandra Day O'Connor and had a good relationship with both her and her husband during her days on the court. He generally had a good working relationship with every justice, but was particularly fond of Ruth Bader Ginsburg, and considered John Paul Stevens to be the "smartest" justice.

=== International recognition ===
Even though Souter had never traveled outside the United States during his years with the Supreme Court, he still gained significant recognition abroad. In 1995, a series of articles based on his written opinions and titled "Souter Court" was published by a Moscow legal journal, The Russian Justice. Those were followed by a book, written in Russian and bearing Souter's name in the title. Justice of the Constitutional Court of the Russian Federation Yury Danilov, reviewing the 2nd edition of the book in a Moscow English-language daily, made the following remark on Souter's position in Bush v. Gore: "In a most critical and delicate situation, David Souter had maintained the independence of his position and in this respect had become a symbol of the independence of the judiciary."

=== Retirement ===
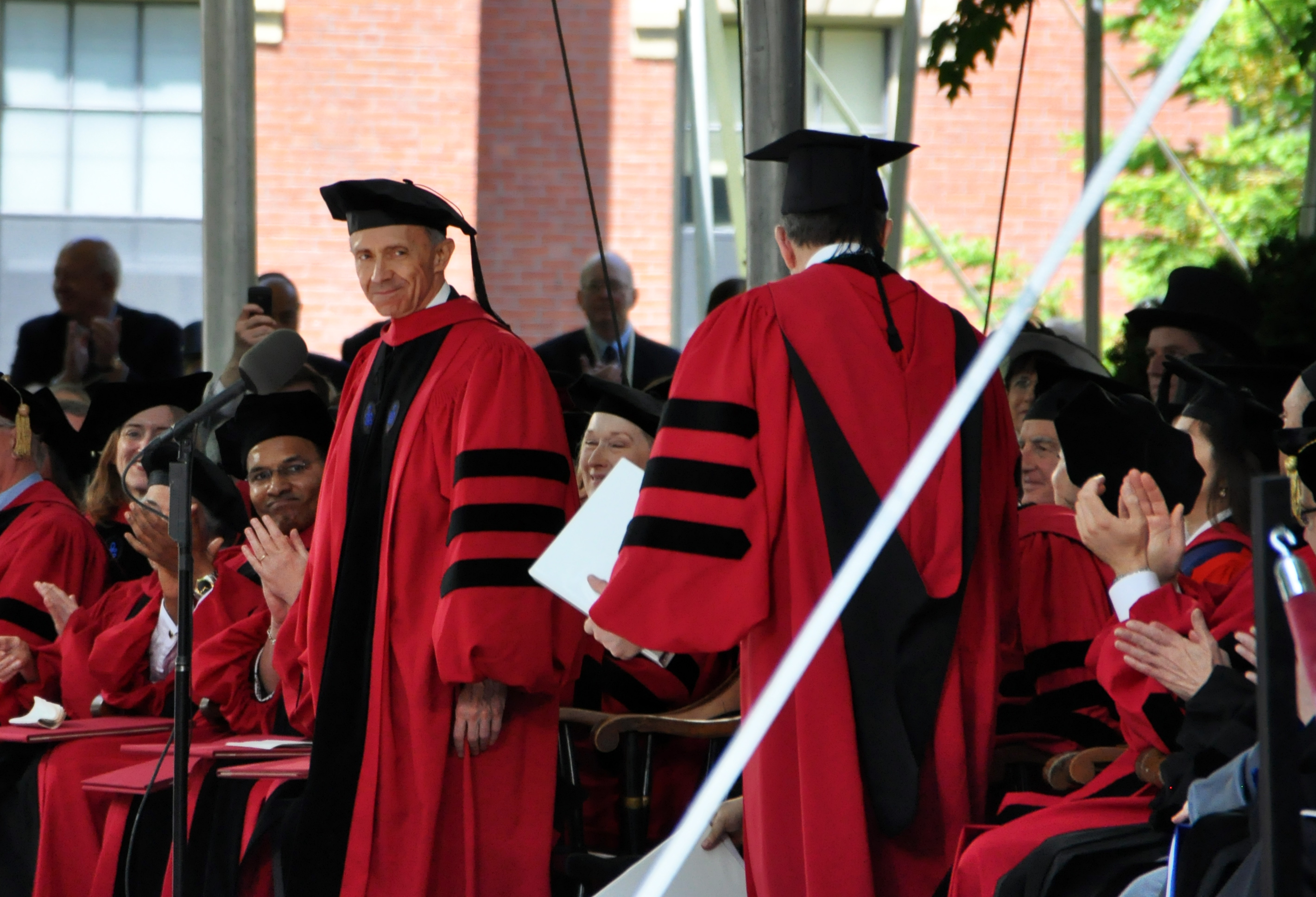
Souter receiving an honorary degree from Harvard University on May 27, 2010

Long before the election of President Obama, Souter had expressed a desire to leave Washington, D.C., and return to New Hampshire. The election of a Democratic president in 2008 may have made Souter more inclined to retire, but he did not want to create a situation in which there would be multiple vacancies at once. Souter apparently became satisfied that no other justices planned to retire at the end of the Supreme Court's term in June 2009. As a result, in mid-April 2009 he privately notified the White House of his intent to retire at the conclusion of that term. Souter sent Obama a retirement letter on May 1, effective at the start of the Supreme Court's 2009 summer recess. Later that day Obama made an unscheduled appearance during the daily White House press briefing to announce Souter's retirement. On May 26, 2009, Obama announced his nomination of federal appeals court judge Sonia Sotomayor. She was confirmed by the U.S. Senate on August 6.

On June 29, 2009, the last day of the Court's 2008–2009 term, Chief Justice Roberts read a letter to Souter that had been signed by all eight of his colleagues as well as retired Justice Sandra Day O'Connor, thanking him for his service, and Souter read a letter to his colleagues reciprocating their good wishes.

Souter's papers have been donated to the New Hampshire Historical Society and will not be made public until at least 50 years after his death.

== Post-Supreme Court career ==
As a Supreme Court justice with retired status, Souter remained a judge and was entitled to sit by designation on lower courts. After his retirement from the Supreme Court and until 2020, he regularly sat by designation on panels of the First Circuit Court of Appeals, based in Boston and covering Maine, Massachusetts, Puerto Rico, Rhode Island, and his adopted home state of New Hampshire, generally in February or March of each year.

Souter maintained a low public profile after retiring from the Supreme Court. In one exception during a 2012 appearance at the Capitol Center for the Arts in New Hampshire, he discussed among other things "the pervasive civic ignorance" of Americans.

== Personal life ==
Once named by The Washington Post as one of Washington's 10 Most Eligible Bachelors, Souter never married, though he was once engaged. He was an Episcopalian.

Souter was elected to the American Philosophical Society in 1994, and the American Academy of Arts and Sciences in 1997.

In 2004, Souter was mugged while jogging between his home and the Fort Lesley J. McNair Army Base in Washington, D.C.. He suffered minor injuries from the event, visiting the MedStar Washington Hospital Center for treatment. News of the attack led to public scrutiny of the Supreme Court Police's security detail, which was not present at the time.

According to Jeffrey Toobin's 2007 book The Nine, Souter had a decidedly low-tech lifestyle: He wrote with a fountain pen, did not use email, and had no cellphone or answering machine. While serving on the Supreme Court, he preferred to drive to New Hampshire for the summer, where he enjoyed mountain climbing. Souter also performed his own home repairs and was known for his daily lunch of an apple and unflavored yogurt.

Former Supreme Court correspondent Linda Greenhouse wrote of Souter that "to focus on his eccentricities—his daily lunch of yogurt and an apple, core and all; the absence of a computer in his personal office—is to miss the essence of a man who in fact is perfectly suited to his job, just not to its trappings. His polite but persistent questioning of lawyers who appear before the court displays his meticulous preparation and his mastery of the case at hand and the cases relevant to it. Far from being out of touch with the modern world, he has simply refused to surrender to it control over aspects of his own life that give him deep contentment: hiking, sailing, time with old friends, reading history."

In early August 2009, Souter moved from his family farmhouse in Weare to a Cape Cod-style single-story house in nearby Hopkinton, New Hampshire, a town in Merrimack County northeast of Weare and immediately west of the state capital of Concord. Souter told a disappointed Weare neighbor that the two-story family farmhouse was not structurally sound enough to support the thousands of books he owned and that he wished to live on one level.

Over the years, Souter served on hospital boards and civic committees. He was an honorary co-chair of the We the People National Advisory Committee.

=== Death ===
Souter died in his home on May 8, 2025, aged 85. Chief Justice John Roberts said after his death, "Justice David Souter served our Court with great distinction for nearly twenty years. He brought uncommon wisdom and kindness to a lifetime of public service. After retiring to his beloved New Hampshire in 2009, he continued to render significant service to our branch by sitting regularly on the Court of Appeals for the First Circuit for more than a decade. He will be greatly missed."

== See also ==
- George H. W. Bush Supreme Court candidates
- Ideological leanings of United States Supreme Court justices
- List of justices of the Supreme Court of the United States
- List of law clerks for the third seat of the Supreme Court of the United States
- List of justices of the Supreme Court of the United States by court composition
- List of justices of the Supreme Court of the United States by seat
- List of United States Supreme Court justices by time in office
- United States Supreme Court cases during the Rehnquist Court
- United States Supreme Court cases during the Roberts Court
- Lost Liberty Hotel
- List of United States federal judges by longevity of service

Legal offices
Preceded by Warren Rudman	Attorney General of New Hampshire; 1976–1978	Succeeded by Thomas D. Rath
Preceded by Hugh H. Bownes	Judge of the United States Court of Appeals for the First Circuit; 1990	Succeeded by Norman H. Stahl
Preceded by William J. Brennan Jr.	Associate Justice of the Supreme Court of the United States; 1990–2009	Succeeded by Sonia Sotomayor
