= Thomas D. Rath =

Thomas D. Rath is a former Attorney General of New Hampshire. He is founder of the law firm of Rath, Young and Pignatelli.

President George H. W. Bush appointed Rath to be a director of the Legal Services Corporation. Rath chaired the senatorial campaigns of Warren Rudman and Judd Gregg. He assisted actively with the confirmation of Supreme Court Justice David Souter by the United States Senate. He served as a senior advisor to the presidential campaigns of George W. Bush, Howard Baker, Mitt Romney, Robert Dole, and Lamar Alexander. He has served as a delegate to the Republican National Convention in 1984, 1988, 1992, 1996, 2000, 2004, and 2008. He is the past National Committeeman from New Hampshire to the Republican Party.
