= The Oath (Toobin book) =

2012 book by Jeffrey Toobin

The Oath: The Obama White House and the Supreme Court
- First edition
- Author: Jeffrey Toobin
- Language: English
- Publisher: Doubleday
- Publication date: 2012
- Publication place: United States
- Media type: Print (hardcover & paperback)
- Pages: 325 pages
- ISBN: 978-0-385-52720-0

The Oath: The Obama White House and the Supreme Court is a 2012 book by Jeffrey Toobin describing the Roberts Court and President Obama's interactions with it. The book's title is a reference to the Oath of office of the president of the United States, and the incident that occurred when John Roberts misspoke while administering the oath to President Obama during his first inauguration.
