= Greg Zanis =

American carpenter (1950–2020)

Greg Zanis (November 27, 1950 – May 4, 2020) was an American carpenter known for building and delivering personalized crosses (and some Stars of David and crescents) to shooting victims across the United States.

== Early life ==
Zanis was born in Spokane, Washington, and grew up in Nashville, Tennessee, to a father who was a Greek Orthodox priest and a mother who was a Greek immigrant and worked as a seamstress. The family spoke Greek at home.

== Crosses for Losses ==
The first cross that Zanis (by this time, a resident of Aurora, Illinois) built was for his own father-in-law, a murder victim. Shortly after the 1999 Columbine High School massacre, Zanis constructed 15 crosses (13 for the victims and two for the shooters, Eric Harris and Dylan Klebold) and delivered them to a park near the site of the shooting. The two crosses for Harris and Klebold were soon cut down by the father of one of the shooting victims.

Since that time, Zanis built and delivered over 26,000 crosses, and also some Stars of David and some crescents, to sites of mass shootings and natural disasters across the United States. He later founded an organization named "Crosses for Losses" to raise funds for this effort,. During that time, he kept handwritten notebooks of the names of the victims for whom he built memorials.

== Personal life ==
In late 2019, Zanis was diagnosed with bladder cancer. He made arrangements to transfer the activities of his organization to the Lutheran Church Charities ministry of the Lutheran Church – Missouri Synod. He died while in hospice in Naperville, Illinois, on May 4, 2020, at age 69.
