= Marlene Sanders =

American journalist and television producer (1931–2015)

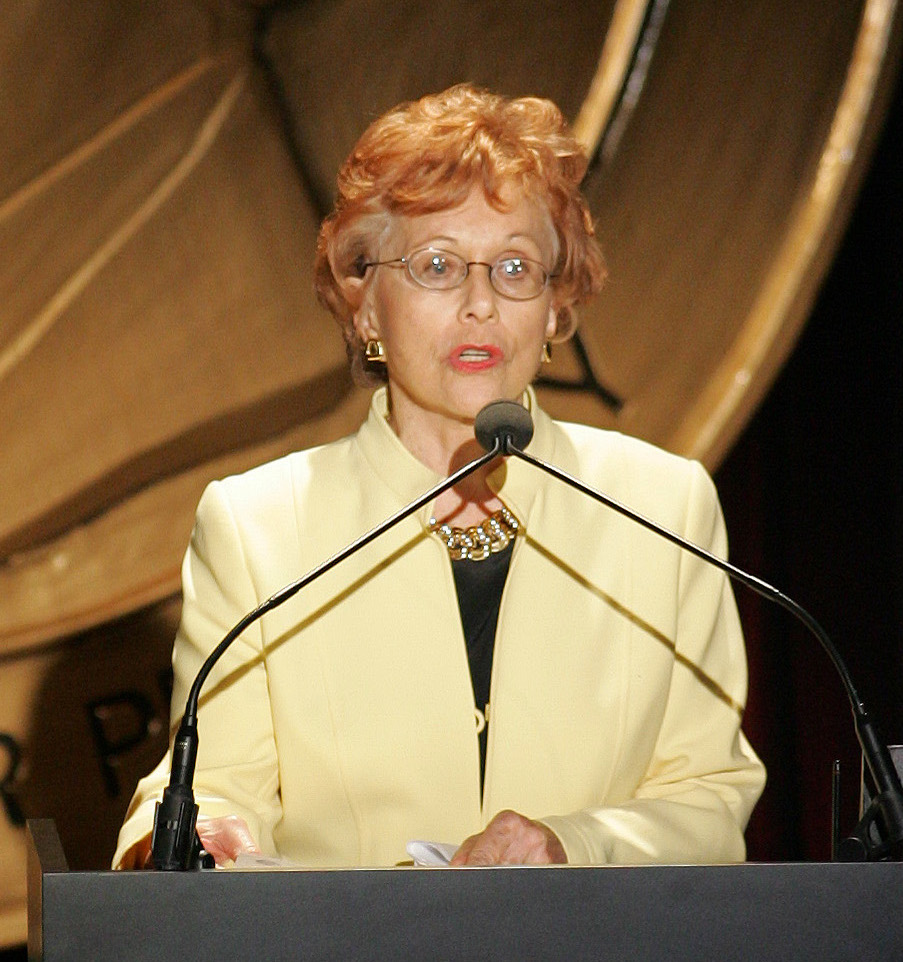
- Sanders in 2005
- Born: January 10, 1931; Shaker Heights, Ohio, U.S.
- Died: July 14, 2015 (aged 84); New York City, New York, U.S.
- Spouse: Jerome Toobin (died 1984)
- Children: Jeffrey Toobin; Mark Toobin

Marlene Sanders (January 10, 1931 – July 14, 2015) was an American television news correspondent, anchor, producer and executive who worked for ABC News in the 1960s and 1970s and moved to CBS News in 1978. She was the first woman to achieve several milestones in the then male-dominated field of television news.

Shortly after joining ABC News as a correspondent in 1964, Sanders became the first woman to anchor an evening news broadcast for a major network when she substituted for the regular anchor, Ron Cochran, who had become ill. She was one of the first television newswomen to report on the Vietnam War from the field. In 1976, ABC promoted her to vice president and director of documentaries, making her one of the first women to reach upper management in the field. She also won three Emmy Awards for documentaries she produced for CBS.

== Early life and education ==
Sanders grew up in a Jewish family in Shaker Heights, Ohio. Her family was relatively secular, though they did attend a Reform synagogue occasionally and were well aware of ongoing issues affecting the Jewish community such as discrimination. As career options were limited at the time, Sanders moved to New York City to pursue a theater career.

== Career ==
In 1955, after failing to land steady work in theater, Sanders accepted a low-level job in television news, working for Ted Yates, the producer for Mike Wallace on WNEW-TV. She became associate producer of the show and, after Wallace left, became a co-producer. This was an unprecedented achievement, as women were typically relegated to performing solely administrative functions in the newsroom.

Her career progressed from there. Sanders is credited with having helped to break down the barriers women faced in broadcasting at the time. She was one of the first television newswomen to cover the Vietnam War from the field; the first woman anchor of a nightly newscast for a major network, and the first woman vice president of the ABC News division.

Sanders began working for CBS News in 1978, where she resumed producing documentaries. She also reported on the women’s movement and the status of women in the news and reporting industry with CBS.

Sanders later became an Emmy Award–winning correspondent, writer, producer and broadcast-news executive. She was a member of the Peabody Awards Board of Jurors from 1998 to 2004.

== Personal life ==
Sanders was married to television producer Jerome Toobin, who died in 1984. Their son Jeffrey Toobin (b. 1960) is a lawyer, author and former CNN legal analyst. Their second son, Mark (b. 1967), was born with Down syndrome in 1967 and lived away from the family, most recently in a group home in Connecticut.

Sanders died from cancer at the age of 84 on July 14, 2015.

== Other ==
Sanders is featured in the feminist history film She's Beautiful When She's Angry.

Sanders’s book (Co-written with Marcia Rock, 2-time Emmy award winning producer of NY documentaries), “Waiting for Prime Time: the women of television news” was published in 1988.
