= Hope Columbine Memorial Library =

Library in Littleton, Colorado

Coordinates: 39.5912°N 105.0801°W

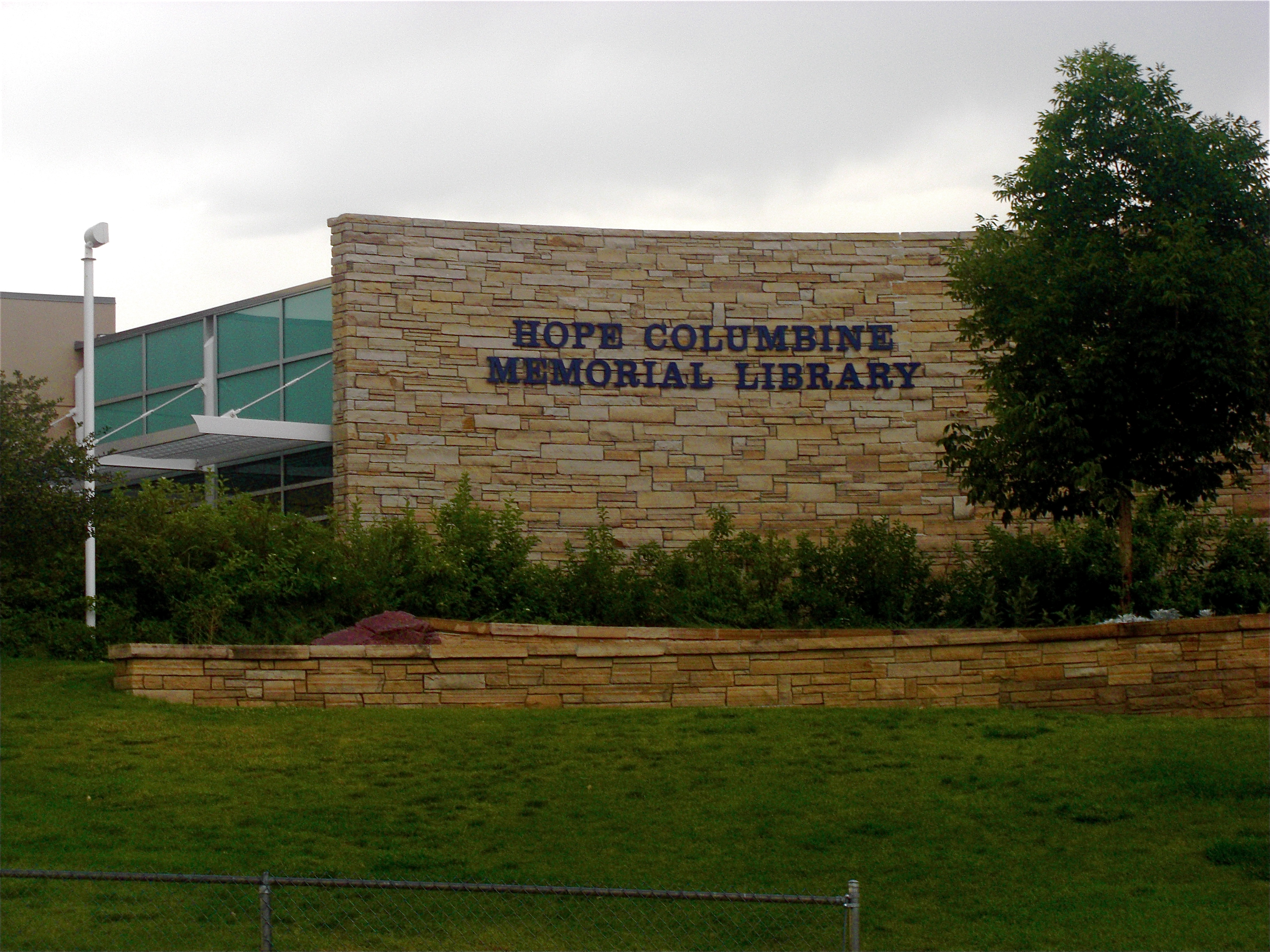
- Hope Columbine Memorial Library in 2008

General information
- Status: Completed
- Location: Littleton, Colorado, 6201 S Pierce St, Columbine Valley, CO 80123, United States
- Opened: June 9, 2001; 25 years ago

The Hope Columbine Memorial Library (stylized with "Hope" in all caps) is a library in Littleton, Colorado, at Columbine High School. It was built after the original library was demolished in January 2000 following the events of the Columbine High School massacre. It opened on June 9, 2001. The original library was also the area where perpetrators, Eric Harris and Dylan Klebold, spent around 10 minutes of the massacre in before they committed suicide by gunshot.

== Background ==
On April 20, 1999, two high school seniors, Eric Harris and Dylan Klebold, attending Columbine High School, entered the school with guns, bombs, and knives. Killing 13 students and one teacher, injuring an additional 23 others. Harris and Klebold then committed suicide by gunshot about 40 minutes after the shooting began.

== History ==
=== Construction and remodeling ===
After the events of the shooting, the original library where Harris and Klebold committed suicide was gutted, and construction on Hope Columbine Memorial Library began. The family of Lauren Townsend, a victim of the massacre, helped build the library. During the construction of the new library, the district removed the floor of the previous library and replaced it with an atrium with a view of the Rocky Mountains. In 2017, Hope Columbine Memorial Library got its first remodel since 2002, adding newly placed power outlets.

=== Previous library ===
The library that came before the current one was the room Harris and Klebold spent around 15 minutes of their time in during the shooting, more towards the middle and end of the shooting. The library is also the area where the two killed most of their victims. Prior to the shooting, the duo planted duffel bags with homemade explosives in them around the cafeteria, the floor below the library. The plan was for the propane bombs to detonate at peak hours in the cafeteria, with their goal being to kill hundreds of people and potentially collapse the floor of the library.

== Purpose ==
The library functions as a space for remembrance and healing, also for remembering the lives lost on the day of the event.
