= The Nine (book) =

Book by Jeffrey Toobin

The Nine: Inside the Secret World of the Supreme Court
- Author: Jeffrey Toobin
- Language: English
- Genre: Non-fiction
- Publication date: 2007
- Publication place: United States

The Nine: Inside the Secret World of the Supreme Court is a 2007 non-fiction book by legal analyst Jeffrey Toobin. Based in part on exclusive interviews with the justices and former law clerks, Toobin profiles the justices of the United States Supreme Court, the functioning of that institution, and how it has changed over the years. The book covers the years from 1994 to 2005.

Publishers Weekly wrote of the book, "Toobin paints not a conservative revolution but a period of intractable moderation. The real power, he argues, belonged to supreme swing-voter Sandra Day O'Connor, who decided important cases with what Toobin sees as an almost primal attunement to a middle-of-the-road public consensus. By contrast, he contends, conservative justices William Rehnquist and Antonin Scalia ended up bitter old men, their rigorous constitutional doctrines made irrelevant by the moderates' compromises."

The book spent four months on the New York Times bestseller list.
