= All That's Interesting =

American news website

All Thatʻs Interesting
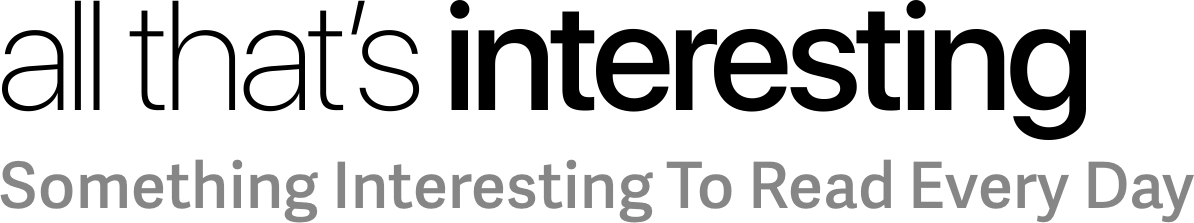
- Website type: News website
- Available in: English
- Founded: 2010; 16 years ago
- Headquarters: Brooklyn, New York, United States
- Founders: Alexander Baldwin, Kit Westneat
- Editor: Jaclyn Anglis
- Website: allthatsinteresting.com
- Users: 5.3 million monthly visitors (2022)
- Current status: Active

All That's Interesting (ATI) is an American news website created in 2010 by Alexander Baldwin and Kit Westneat to cover various "interesting" topics. ATI are based in Brooklyn, New York, and describe themselves as a "digital publisher that seeks out the stories to illuminate the past, present, and future".

== History ==
All Thatʻs Interesting was created in 2010 by Alexander Baldwin and Kit Westneat as a news website that covers various topics considered "interesting". According to them, the website is based in Brooklyn, New York. The men later hired an editorial team consisting of writers and editors; they have since published more than eleven thousand articles on various topics, such as true crime, popular culture and science. Reportedly, the ATI website is viewed 5.3 million times per month, 68% of the traffic coming from search, while 14% comes from direct visits. ATI has a significant presence on social media and operates a Facebook account that publishes posts every few hours. ATI earns money through ads, user traffic and paid subscriptions to the website.

Content of All Thatʻs Interesting was cited by a number of websites and news organizations like Snopes and Wikipedia. Reportedly, ATI sought to hire freelance writers that are experienced in WordPress and have the capacity to write articles consisting of 800 to 1,500 words in 2019, paying them $150 per article. Managing editor of the website is Jaclyn Anglis, who was hired by ATI in October 2019.

== Reception ==
In August 2019, fact-checker Lead Stories labeled one of ATI's articles, which talked about Carpenter v. Murphy court case, as fake news due to it misrepresenting the subject. Citing NewsGuard, Lead Stories said the site can still be trusted to maintain journalistic standards.
