= Jerome Toobin =

American television producer

- Born: December 6, 1919; Philadelphia, Pennsylvania, U.S.
- Died: January 22, 1984 (aged 64)
- Education: B.A. Temple University
- Spouse: Marlene Sanders
- Children: Jeffrey Toobin

Jerome Toobin (December 6, 1919 – January 22, 1984) was an American television producer.

== Biography ==
Toobin was born to a Jewish family in Philadelphia and graduated from Temple University in 1943. He served in the United States Army Air Forces during World War II and rose to the rank of Lieutenant. He was married to Marlene Sanders for 25 years and is the father of Jeffrey Toobin, a lawyer, author, and former columnist for The New Yorker and legal analyst for CNN.

He was Bill Moyers' producer, including as the first executive producer of Bill Moyers Journal on PBS in the 1970s, and at CBS. He was also director of news and public affairs for New York's Channel 13 (WNET), starting from 1974.

Toobin died of a heart attack at age 64; services were held at the Riverside Memorial Chapel.
