= Homegrown (book) =

History book by Jeffrey Toobin

Homegrown: Timothy McVeigh and the Rise of Right-Wing Extremism
- 2023 book jacket
- Author: Jeffrey Toobin
- Subject: Biography, Domestic terrorism, History, Politics, Nationalism, Trials (Terrorism)
- Genre: Nonfiction
- Set in: Oklahoma City, Washington D.C., Texas, Rural areas
- Published: 2023
- Publisher: Simon & Schuster
- Publication place: United States
- Media type: Print, E-book, Audio
- Pages: 428
- ISBN: 9781668013571 9781668013595
- OCLC: 1372437010
- Website: Official website

Homegrown: Timothy McVeigh and the Rise of Right-Wing Extremism is a chronicle of the political, historical and media-personality influences that radicalized McVeigh resulting in the 1995 Oklahoma City bombing. The book also ties McVeigh and those same influences to the radical right politics and the sometimes violent right-wing extremism of today's postmodern United States. It was written by Jeffrey Toobin and published in 2023 by Simon & Schuster.

In his "Prologue", Toobin writes: "In the decades since [McVeigh's] death, the rise in right-wing extremism, the January 6 insurrection, and much in the contemporary conservative movement, show how McVeigh’s values, views, and tactics have endured and even flourished. That makes the story of Timothy McVeigh and the Oklahoma City bombing not just a glimpse of the past but also a warning about the future."

== Plot ==
Toobin begins his book with his own reporting from the 1997 federal trial of McVeigh and his accomplice Terry Nichols, as they were tried for the Oklahoma City bombing. The book contains recent interviews with former President Bill Clinton and Biden's Attorney General Merrick Garland, who led the prosecution in the case against McVeigh and Nichols.

The book also includes interviews McVeigh conducted with his defense attorney while in prison. In them, McVeigh recounts how he knew Nichols was someone he could influence and involve in planning the attack, as well as details of the bomb preparation and a chronological breakdown of the morning of the bombing of the Alfred P. Murrah Federal Building.

Toobin also delves into the issues that motivated McVeigh and Nichols to plan and (for McVeigh) to carry out the attack, including conspiracy theories, an obsession with firearms, hatred of the federal government and state control, as well as their deep racism, mainly inspired by far-right readings such as The Turner Diaries.

In later chapters, Toobin compares McVeigh's ideology to that of President Donald Trump's Make America Great Again movement and links it to the 2021 January 6 United States Capitol attack. Toobin argues that if social media had existed in McVeigh's time, he would surely have found more accomplices besides Nichols and the Fortiers.

Toobin also explores the childhoods of both McVeigh and Nichols, suggesting that McVeigh was an incel, even before the term existed, claiming that the sexual rejection of some women whom McVeigh liked caused him to express misogynistic hatred. The book also touches the issue of McVeigh's growing racism; believing that African Americans lived on welfare, McVeigh showed rage by the inability to get a stable job.

Toobin clarifies that he wished to contact Nichols, who remains incarcerated at the ADX Florence in Colorado, where he is serving 168 life sentences without parole. Federal laws prevented him from interviewing Nichols.

A short excerpt also includes McVeigh's final defense attorney, Rob Nigh, who persuaded him during the months preceding his execution on June 11, 2001, not to request that his ashes be scattered at the Oklahoma City bombing site, which Nigh considered unnecessarily provocative.

== See also ==
- American Terrorist
- Terry Nichols
- 1921 Tulsa race massacre
