= Jeffrey Toobin =

American lawyer and author (born 1960)

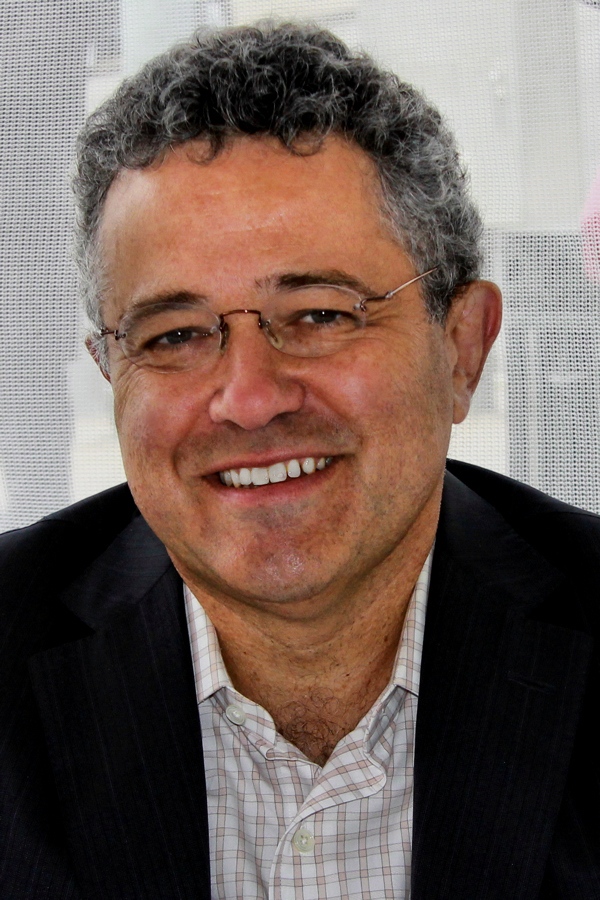
- Toobin at the 2012 Texas Book Festival
- Born: Jeffrey Ross Toobin; May 21, 1960 (age 66); New York City, New York, US
- Education: Harvard University (BA, JD)
- Occupations: Legal analyst, commentator
- Notable credit(s): The New Yorker (1993–2020); CNN senior legal analyst (2002–2022)
- Spouse: Amy Bennett McIntosh (m. 1986)
- Children: 3
- Parent(s): Jerome Toobin; Marlene Sanders
- Website: jeffreytoobin.com

Jeffrey Ross Toobin (/ˈtuːbɪn/; born May 21, 1960) is an American lawyer, author, blogger, and legal analyst for CNN.

During the Iran–Contra affair, Toobin served as an associate counsel on its investigation at the Department of Justice. He moved from government and the practice of law into full-time writing during the 1990s, when he published his first books. He wrote for The New Yorker from 1993 until 2020, when Toobin was fired for masturbating on-camera during a Zoom video conference call with co-workers. He apologized for his conduct and stated that he believed his camera was off during the incident. He continues to serve as a legal analyst for CNN.

Toobin has written several books, including accounts of the 1970s Patty Hearst kidnapping and her time with the SLA, the O. J. Simpson murder case, and the Clinton–Lewinsky scandal. The latter two were adapted for television as seasons of FX's American Crime Story, with the Simpson case premiering in 2016.

== Early life, family and education ==
Toobin was born to a Jewish-American family in New York City in 1960, a son of Marlene Sanders, former ABC News and CBS News correspondent, and Jerome Toobin, a news broadcasting producer. His younger brother, Mark, born in 1967 with Down syndrome, has lived apart from the family.

Toobin attended Columbia Grammar & Preparatory School. While attending Harvard College for undergraduate studies, he covered sports for The Harvard Crimson. His column was titled "Inner Toobin". Toobin graduated magna cum laude with a Bachelor of Arts degree in American history and literature and was awarded a Harry S. Truman Scholarship.

He attended Harvard Law School (future Supreme Court Justice Elena Kagan was a classmate) and was an editor of the Harvard Law Review. He graduated in 1986 magna cum laude.

== Career ==
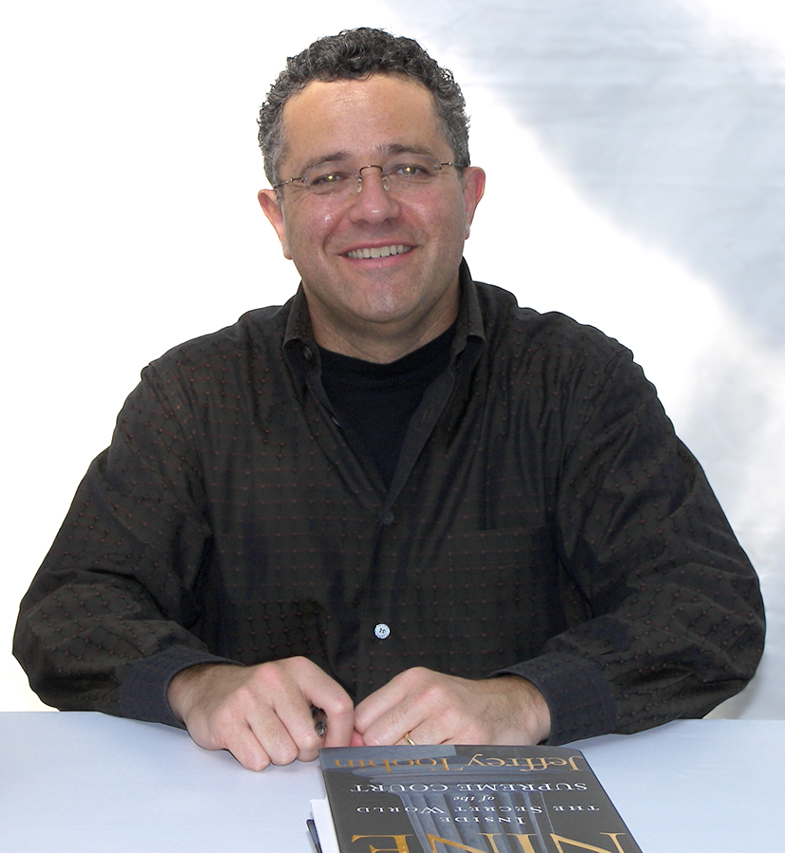
Toobin promoting his book The Nine: Inside the Secret World of the Supreme Court at the 2007 Texas Book Festival

Toobin began freelancing for The New Republic while a law student. After passing the bar exam, he worked as a law clerk to US circuit judge J. Edward Lumbard of the U.S. Court of Appeals for the Second Circuit. Next he served as an associate counsel for Independent Counsel Lawrence Walsh during the Iran–Contra affair and Oliver North's criminal trial. He moved to serve as an Assistant United States Attorney for the Eastern District of New York in Brooklyn.

Toobin wrote a book, Opening Arguments: A Young Lawyer's First Case: United States v. Oliver North (1991), about his work in the Office of Independent Counsel, to which Walsh objected. Toobin had been required to sign multiple agreements to protect the confidentiality of grand jury and internal proceedings of the office. But he had taken thousands of pages of notes with him and based his book on such information, revealing material that Walsh believed should have been held as private. Toobin went to court to affirm his right to publish. Judge John F. Keenan of the United States District Court for the Southern District of New York wrote an opinion that Toobin and his publisher had the right to release this book. The book was published before Walsh's appeal could be decided, mooting the case. Accordingly, the Circuit Court vacated the lower court's decision and ordered the dismissal of the case.

After three years as an Assistant US Attorney, Toobin resigned and abandoned "the practice of law." He started working as a writer at The New Yorker in 1993 and became a television legal analyst for ABC in 1996.

Toobin has provided broadcast legal analysis on several high-profile cases. In 1994, Toobin broke the story in The New Yorker that the legal defense team in O. J. Simpson's criminal trial planned to accuse Mark Fuhrman of the LAPD of planting evidence. Toobin provided analysis of Michael Jackson's 2005 child molestation trial, the O. J. Simpson civil case, and independent prosecutor Kenneth Starr's investigation of President Bill Clinton.

He published books on some of these cases: The Run of His Life: The People v OJ Simpson (1997), and A Vast Conspiracy (1999), about the investigation of Clinton for the Monica Lewinsky sex scandal. Each of these books was later adapted for television, the Simpson case as a mini-series, and the Clinton as an episode.

In 2000, Toobin received an Emmy Award for his coverage of the Elián González custody saga, which had resulted in the return of the boy from the United States to communist-led Cuba.

Toobin joined CNN in 2002 as a legal analyst. In 2003, he secured the first interview with Martha Stewart about the insider trading charges against her.

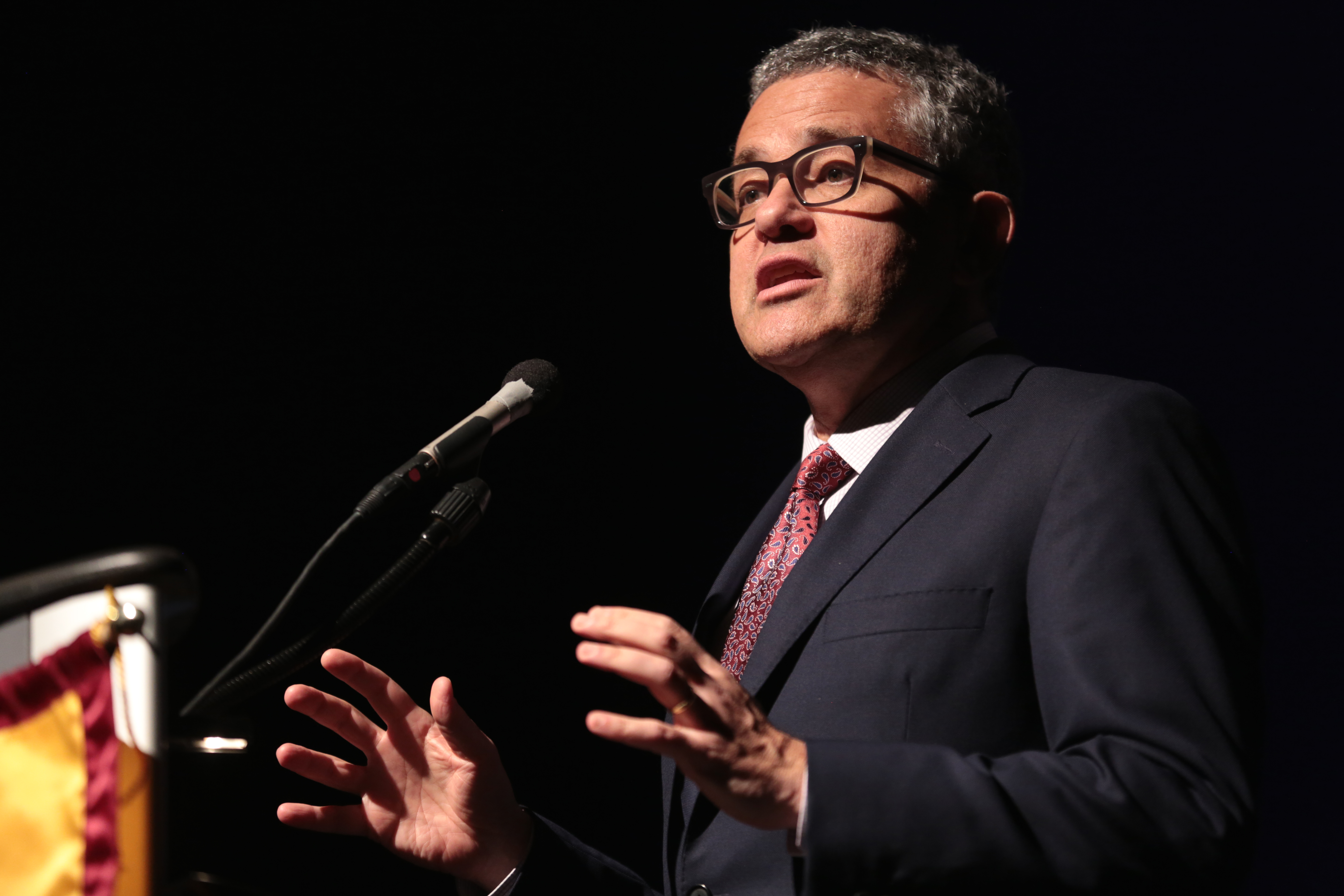
Toobin speaking about the Supreme Court at the John J. Rhodes Lecture in Tempe, Arizona

Toobin has authored seven books. His The Nine: Inside the Secret World of the Supreme Court (2007) received awards from the Columbia University Graduate School of Journalism and the Nieman Foundation for Journalism at Harvard University.

His next book was The Oath: The Obama White House and the Supreme Court (2012). American Heiress: The Kidnapping, Crimes and Trial of Patty Hearst (2016), explored events from the 1970s. All were New York Times Best Sellers.

He wrote True Crimes and Misdemeanors, the Investigation of Donald Trump (2020), described as a "summation for the jury" against the character and presidency of Donald Trump, as if he were on trial.

On August 12, 2022, Toobin announced via Twitter that he would leave CNN after 20 years. His last day on air was August 4. In February 2024, Toobin began appearing again on CNN as a frequent guest, offering analysis on both president Biden and former president Trump's current legal situations.

== Adaptations ==
Two of Toobin's books were adapted for television. His book on the OJ Simpson trial was adapted as The People v. O.J. Simpson: American Crime Story, a 2016 mini-series comprising the first season of the FX true-crime anthology series. A Vast Conspiracy (1999), about the Clinton-Lewinsky scandal, was adapted as a series, Impeachment: American Crime Story (2021), in the FX anthology.

== Zoom masturbation incident ==
On October 19, 2020, during the first year of the COVID-19 pandemic, Toobin was suspended from The New Yorker after he masturbated on camera during a Zoom video call between New Yorker and WNYC radio staffers. CNN said Toobin "has asked for some time off while he deals with a personal issue, which we have granted". Toobin said in a statement: "I made an embarrassingly stupid mistake, believing I was off-camera. I apologize to my wife, family, friends and co-workers." In November 2020, he was fired from The New Yorker, following an internal investigation by the parent organization, Condé Nast. New York Public Radio, which owns WNYC, indefinitely banned Toobin from its broadcasts and podcasts.

Toobin was widely ridiculed in the wake of the incident by, among others, O. J. Simpson, Jimmy Fallon, Bill Maher, Donald Trump Jr., and performers on Saturday Night Live. Irene Katz Connelly pointed out the parallels between him positioning perpetrators of sex scandals as victims in his writing with his response to the Zoom incident. Defenders included Tina Brown, a former New Yorker editor, who said that "27 years of superb reporting and commitment to The New Yorker should have been weighed against an incident that horribly embarrassed the magazine but mostly embarrassed himself." Canadian author and journalist Malcolm Gladwell said he "read the Condé Nast news release, and I was puzzled because I couldn't find any intellectual justification for what they were doing."

On June 10, 2021, Toobin returned to CNN as its chief legal analyst. He described his conduct as "deeply moronic and indefensible" and said he "didn't think other people could see [him]", but admitted that this was no defense for his behavior. He said the time he spent off air went toward "trying to be a better person", working on his upcoming book about the Oklahoma City bombing, going to therapy, and working at a food bank.

== Personal life ==
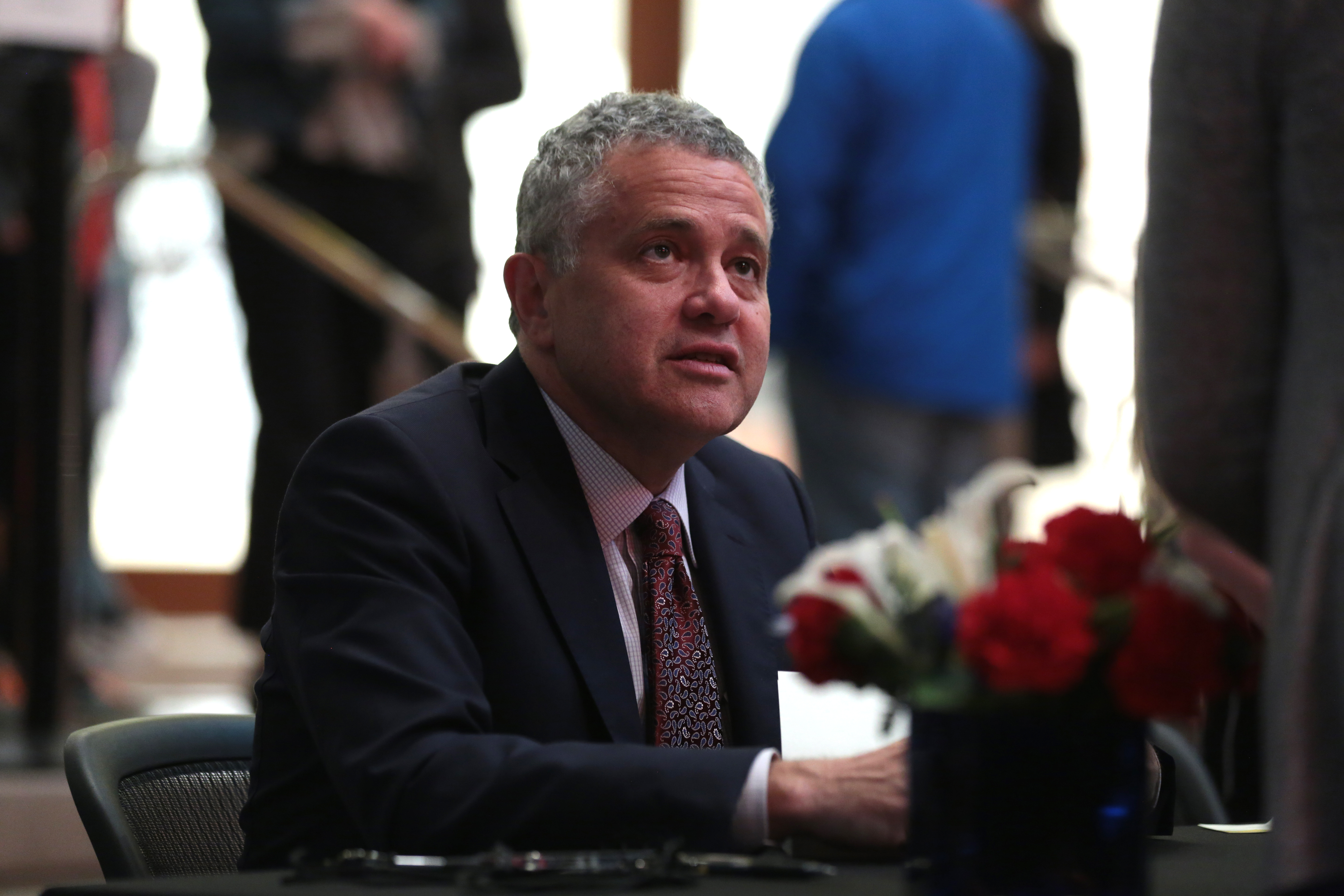
Toobin in 2017

In 1986, Toobin married Amy Bennett McIntosh, whom he met in college while they worked at The Harvard Crimson. She is a 1980 Harvard graduate, holds an MBA degree from Harvard Business School, and has held executive positions at Verizon Communications and Zagat Survey. They have two adult children, a daughter and son.

Toobin had a longtime off-and-on extramarital affair with attorney Casey Greenfield, the daughter of American television journalist and author Jeff Greenfield and Carrie Carmichael. Casey Greenfield was formerly married to screenwriter Matt Manfredi. Greenfield gave birth to Toobin's son in 2009; Toobin initially resisted acknowledging the boy. Toobin's paternity was confirmed with a DNA test as part of a suit by Greenfield for custody and child support.

== Publications ==
=== Books ===
- Toobin, Jeffrey (1991). Opening arguments: a young lawyer's first case, United States v. Oliver North. New York: Viking.
- — (1992) [1991]. Opening arguments: a young lawyer's first case : United States v. Oliver North (Revised & updated ed.). New York: Penguin.
- — (1997). The run of his life: the People v. O. J. Simpson.
- — (1999). A vast conspiracy : the real story of the sex scandal that nearly brought down a president. New York: Random House.
- — (2001). Too close to call : the thirty-six-day battle to decide the 2000 Election. New York: Random House. ISBN 978-0-375-50708-3.
- — (2007). The Nine: Inside the Secret World of the Supreme Court. New York: Doubleday. Winner of the J. Anthony Lukas Book Prize
- — (2012). The Oath: The Obama White House and the Supreme Court. New York: Doubleday.
- — (2016). American Heiress: The Wild Saga of the Kidnapping, Crimes and Trial of Patty Hearst. New York: Doubleday.
- — (2020). True Crimes and Misdemeanors: The Investigation of Donald Trump. Knopf Doubleday Publishing Group. ISBN 978-0-385-53674-5.
- — (2023). Homegrown: Timothy McVeigh and the Rise of Right-Wing Extremism. New York: Simon & Schuster.
- — (2025). The Pardon: The Politics of Presidential Mercy. New York: Simon & Schuster.

=== Essays and reporting ===
- Toobin, Jeffrey (February 9, 1998). "The Trouble With Sex: Why the law of sexual harassment has never worked". The New Yorker. pp. 48–55.
- — (2009). "Google's gatekeepers". In Lithwick, Dahlia (ed.). The best American legal writing. New York: Kaplan. ISBN 9781607144663.
- — (January 12, 2009). "Barney's great adventure". Profiles. The New Yorker. Vol. 84, no. 44. pp. 36–47. Profiles US Representative Barney Frank
- — (May 24, 2010). "Activism v. restraint". The Talk of the Town. Comment. The New Yorker. Vol. 86, no. 14. pp. 19–20.
- — (March 26, 2012). "Holding court". The Talk of the Town. Comment. The New Yorker. Vol. 88, no. 6. pp. 41–42. Legal challenges to the Affordable Care Act.
- — (May 21, 2012). "Money unlimited". The Talk of the Town. Annals of Law. The New Yorker. Regarding Citizens United v. FEC
- — (November 19, 2012). "Right to vote". The Talk of the Town. Annals of Law. The New Yorker. Vol. 88, no. 36. pp. 29–30. regarding Bush v. Gore
- — (January 14, 2013). "Casting votes". The Talk of the Town. Comment. The New Yorker. Vol. 88, no. 43. pp. 17–18.
- — (January 14, 2013). "Mystery meal". The Talk of the Town. Ink. The New Yorker. Vol. 88, no. 43. p. 23.
- — (January 28, 2013). "The people's choice". The Talk of the Town. Comment. The New Yorker. Vol. 88, no. 45. pp. 19–20.
- — (March 11, 2013). "Heavyweight : how Ruth Bader Ginsburg has moved the Supreme Court". Profiles. The New Yorker. Vol. 89, no. 4. pp. 38–47.
- — (April 1, 2013). "Wedding bells". The Talk of the Town. Comment. The New Yorker. Vol. 89, no. 7. pp. 21–22.
- — (July 8–15, 2013). "Adieu, DOMA!". The Talk of the Town. Comment. The New Yorker. Vol. 89, no. 20. pp. 27–28.
- — (August 5, 2013). "Daughters of Texas : the fight for abortion rights". Letter from Austin. The New Yorker. Vol. 89, no. 23. pp. 24–29.
- — (December 23–30, 2013). "Cruel and Unusual". The Talk of the Town. Comment. The New Yorker. Vol. 89, no. 42. pp. 37–38. Methods of execution.
- — (April 14, 2014). "This is my jail : where gang members and their female guards set the rules". Letter from Baltimore. The New Yorker. Vol. 90, no. 8. pp. 26–32. Discusses Baltimore City Detention Center.
- — (February 16, 2015). "The Albany chronicles : how Andrew Cuomo gets his way". Profiles. The New Yorker. Vol. 91, no. 1. pp. 48–59.
- — (July 27, 2015). "American limbo : while politicians block reforms, what is happening to immigrant families?". A Reporter at Large. The New Yorker. Vol. 91, no. 21. pp. 30–35.
- — (February 29, 2016). "Looking back". The Talk of the Town. Comment. The New Yorker. Vol. 92, no. 3. pp. 17–18. Justice Antonin Scalia.
- — (December 19–26, 2016). "When truth is not enough : sex tapes, the demise of Gawker, and what the Trump era means for the First Amendment". Annals of Law. The New Yorker. Vol. 92, no. 42. pp. 96–105. Online title: "Gawker's demise and the Trump-era threat to the First Amendment"
- — (February 27, 2017). "Tipped scales". The Talk of the Town. The Bench. The New Yorker. Vol. 93, no. 2. pp. 22–23. Online title: "Loretta Lynch's ideal of justice".
- — (July 3, 2017). "Feeding the beast : David Pecker's reign at the National Enquirer and the rise of Trump". The Publishing World. The New Yorker. Vol. 93, no. 19. pp. 38–47. Online title: "The National Enquirer's fervor for Trump".
- Toobin, Jeffrey (December 11, 2017). "Michael Flynn's Guilty Plea Sends Donald Trump's Lawyers Scrambling". The New Yorker.
- — (April 2, 2018). "Russia redux". The Talk of the Town. Time Capsule. The New Yorker. Vol. 94, no. 7. pp. 28–29. Online title: "Sex, spies, and clunky computers on 'The Americans'".
- — (September 17, 2018). "The week that was". The Talk of the Town. Comment. The New Yorker. Vol. 94, no. 28. pp. 13–14. Online title: "The deceptive contrast between Trump and Kavanaugh".
- — (March 4, 2019). "May days". The Talk of the Town. Comment. The New Yorker. Vol. 95, no. 2. pp. 15–16. Online title: "Andrew McCabe's countdown to the Mueller Report"
- — (May 27, 2019). "The threat to Roe". The Talk of the Town. Comment. The New Yorker. Vol. 95, no. 14. pp. 19–20. Online title: "The abortion fight and the pretense of precedent"
