= Missing (American TV series) =

American television series

- Genre: Mystery; Action; Espionage; Thriller
- Created by: Gregory Poirier
- Starring: Ashley Judd; Cliff Curtis; Sean Bean; Adriano Giannini; Nick Eversman; Tereza Voříšková
- Composers: Robert Duncan; Kim Planert
- Country of origin: United States
- Original language: English
- No. of seasons: 1
- No. of episodes: 10

Production
- Executive producers: Gregory Poirier; Grant Scharbo; Ashley Judd; Gina Matthews; Stephen Shill
- Producers: Gideon Amir; David Minkowski; Matthew Stillman; Faruk Ozerten (pilot only)
- Cinematography: Arthur Albert
- Editors: Nick Arthurs; Allan Lee; Simon Webb
- Camera setup: Single-camera
- Running time: 43 minutes
- Production companies: Upcountry Productions; Little Engine Productions; ABC Studios

Original release
- Network: ABC
- Release: March 15 – May 17, 2012

Missing is an American mystery thriller drama television series starring Ashley Judd, Cliff Curtis, and Sean Bean. The series aired on ABC from March 15 to May 17, 2012. It was announced on May 17, 2011, that the show would be part of ABC's midseason lineup for 2012. A total of ten episodes were ordered for its first and only season. ABC canceled the series on May 11, 2012, prior to the airing of its final episode.

Missing received two Primetime Emmy Award nominations in 2012: Outstanding Lead Actress in a Limited or Anthology Series or Movie (Judd), and Outstanding Music Composition for a Limited or Anthology Series, Movie or Special (Original Dramatic Score).

== Plot ==
The series follows Rebecca "Becca" Winstone (Ashley Judd), a widow and retired CIA agent raising her 18-year-old son, Michael (Nick Eversman). In 2001, Becca and her husband, Paul Winstone (Sean Bean), were active CIA operatives when Paul was killed in a car bombing, an event witnessed by their young son. A decade later, Michael is accepted into a summer architecture program in Rome, Italy. Though initially reluctant, Becca agrees to let him go.

After more than a week with no contact from Michael and receiving a call from the school stating that he has moved out of his dorm, Becca travels to Rome to investigate. Her search leads her into a web of international conspiracy involving the CIA and revelations that her husband may still be alive. Becca enlists the help of Interpol agent Giancarlo Rossi (Adriano Giannini), a former lover, to aid in her mission. As they search for Michael, he forms an alliance with Oksana (Tereza Voříšková), a Russian girl he befriends while trying to evade his captors.

== Cast and characters ==
=== Main ===
- Ashley Judd as Rebecca "Becca" Winstone
- Cliff Curtis as Agent Dax Miller
- Sean Bean as Paul Winstone
- Nick Eversman as Michael Winstone
- Adriano Giannini as Giancarlo Rossi
- Tereza Voříšková as Oksana

=== Recurring ===
- Keith Carradine as Martin Newman, Becca's former CIA trainer and mentor; he is also Michael's godfather. He is now a best selling author of espionage novels, one of which contains Rick Castle's endorsement on the cover.
- Aunjanue Ellis as Mary Dresden, Becca's business partner and close friend.
- Laura Donnelly as Violet Heath, a member of Miller's CIA team.
- Gina McKee as Jamie Ortega, CIA director in charge of Dax's station, based in Washington D.C.
- Jason Wong as Fitzpatrick, a member of Miller's CIA team.
- Jessica Boone as Rabia, a CIA computer technician.
- Karel Roden as Viktor Azimoff, a former Russian agent.
- Nikola Navratil as Maxim Azimoff, a professional hit man and Viktor's son.

== Episodes ==
No.	Title	Directed by	Written by	Original release date	U.S. viewers (millions)
1	"Pilot"	Stephen Shill	Gregory Poirier	March 15, 2012	10.60
CIA agent Paul Winstone (Sean Bean) is murdered in a car bombing in Europe. Ten years later, his 18-year-old son, Michael Winstone, goes to Europe for an architecture program. When Michael doesn't call home in over a week, his mother, Rebecca 'Becca' Winstone, goes to Europe to look for him. After she kills one foreign spy who makes an attempt on her life, the CIA becomes alert to her activities. Recognizing an Italian street in one of her son's cellphone photos, she breaks into a jewelry store, to view the store's video surveillance records of that street. Her old spy sources trace the tag number of a truck in the security footage, to a warehouse in France. The CIA intercepts her on the train to France. She is questioned by CIA bureau chief Dax Miller. When Dax relays his find to CIA headquarters at Langley, they order him to send Becca back to the United States. However, he gives her three hours to uncover information. She breaks into the French warehouse and finds photos which reveal that her son has been tracked for years by an unknown conspiracy. She finds evidence that Michael was there. After Becca fights an armed guard, she makes an telephone transmission to Agent Dax Miller; A CIA team is dispatched to the warehouse. They find a note from Becca, which reads: "He was here." The episode ends with Becca in a river, the water cloudy with her blood.
2	"The Hard Drive"	Stephen Shill	Grant Scharbo	March 22, 2012	8.81
Becca survives with the help of a former French intelligence agent, who says she can not assist her more as all European intelligence are on the lookout for Rebecca. Rebecca points guns at some French policemen, ordering her own arrest, in order to be taken to Antoine Lussier (Joaquim de Almeida) the deputy chief of French Intelligence. A mysterious hard disk is mentioned which contains proof of corruption charges against Lussier. Becca makes a deal that if French intelligence can find Michael, she will surrender the hard drive, which is actually the nickname for a man (Lothaire Bluteau), who worked for Lussier 12 years earlier and has autobiographical memory. After nearly falling into a trap to capture them both, Becca and Harddrive hack into Lussier's computer which reveals that Lussier authorized an emergency flight which is about to leave in 20 minutes. Rebecca leaves the office to find Michael before his kidnappers can take him out of France, as Harddrive uploads all files from Lussier's computer to the internet, exposing his corruption. Rebecca reaches the airport just in time to see Michael but his kidnappers force him onto the plane before Becca can catch them.
3	"Ice Queen"	Stephen Shill	Paul Redford	March 29, 2012	7.87
CIA agents raid the airplane; Michael is not on the plane. Now in a new location, Michael determines from the architecture of his place of captivity that he is somewhere in Russia. A young girl, named Oksana (Tereza Voříšková), tends to Michael's needs, and works to gain his trust. A woman named Sloane (Victoria Smurfit) who was on the airplane that took Michael out of France, is tracked to a charity auction of a yacht in Ravello, Italy. Italian Interpol agent Rossi helps Becca ditch CIA agent Miller, but then Becca suddenly gets an inconvenient visit in Ravello, from her best-friend Mary. Becca evades Sloane's henchmen, and sneaks aboard the yacht. Rebecca picks a lock on a wood box, and finds a bag of diamonds. On the docks, Rebecca phones Sloane, demanding an immediate meeting on the bay, in one hour. Sloane kidnaps Mary, as leverage against Becca, but Mary escapes from Sloane's speedboat. Sloane reluctantly puts down her gun, as Becca threatens to drop the diamonds in the bay. Sloane divulges that the kidnapping of Michael is about Becca's late husband Paul. Seconds later, a sniper kills Sloane. Interpol Agent Rossi cannot help further. The Paul Winstone Interpol file is sealed. Becca needs to trust Agent Dax Miller.
4	"Tell Me No Lies"	Stephen Shill	Meredith Lavender & Marcie Ulin	April 5, 2012	7.24
Martin Newman (Keith Carradine) was Becca's CIA mentor, and also lead investigator into Paul Winstone's death. Newman joins the search. A tattooed man who is spotted in the Hotel surveillance video, when Michael saw his fathers murder, is also spotted in an old Winstone family photo. They identify the tattooed man as an ex-Mossad agent turned assassin. Agent Miller is told by CIA headquarters to cease the search. Newman convinces Agent Miller to defy those orders, and search for Michael. Newman tells Becca that Paul was suspected of being corrupt. In Dubrovnik, Becca chases after a suspect who has just killed the tattooed assassin. She has the suspect cornered and he is her husband Paul Winstone. With nowhere to run, he climbs over a seawall, jumping into the Adriatic Sea. Michael does some snooping around the mansion, and the snarly henchman locks Michael in his room. Later, a bloodied Oksana is thrown into Michael's room. She has taken a beating for Michael's snooping; But she says that for some still unknown reason, they will not hurt Michael. The CIA has learned of Paul Winstone's reappearance, and Dax is authorized to resume the operation.
5	"The Three Bears"	Paul Edwards	Adele Lim	April 12, 2012	7.91
The CIA's #1 priority is finding Paul. Dax's new strategy is to follow Becca instead of threatening to send her home. Interpol Agent Rossi discovers Paul has made a deposit into a dormant bank account in Prague. Becca and Rossi travel to Prague, and learn Paul has a safety deposit box; but the box requires thumbprints of Paul, Becca, and Michael. A man she recognizes as having made an exchange with Paul years earlier, attempts to capture her, and cut off her thumb. In video of Paul entering the bank, Becca sees Paul signaling her. Unable to access the box, Becca robs the safety deposit box with Rossi's help. The CIA arrives at the bank to attempt to stop her, but Becca and Rossi succeed. They disclose the contents of the box to Dax; it contains stock certificates from a Russian company, cash and a deed. At the house, Oksana leads Michael to a secret exit. He escapes, but he goes back to the house. He refuses to abandon Oksana. Documents in the box lead Rossi, Becca, and Dax to a house in the Czech countryside, but before they can find anything, they trigger a timing device.
6	"A Busy Solitude"	Paul Edwards	Patrick MacManus	April 19, 2012	7.23
Paul hijacks the CIA car carrying the Russian stock certificates. Later, Paul makes a drop-off with the certificates, and reports it to his Russian contact, who we now know as former Russian intelligence agent Azimoff. A search by the CIA of another of Paul's European houses reveals a master copy of a phony ID for Michael. CIA Director Ortega is now in Europe. Becca steals a helicopter, and crosses into Russia, where she walks into Azimoff's office at a Russian chemical company. Becca is taken by force to the house where Michael has been. Azimoff and a sniper in the woods shoot a Russian who is chasing down Michael. Michael and Oksana escape onto a train. Becca wants to go after Azimoff, but CIA Director Ortega places Becca into CIA custody. Dax rejects Agent Rossi's presence. Director Ortega says Rossi is a guest of a CIA operation.
7	"Measure of a Man"	Phil Abraham	Dana Greenblatt & Gregory Poirier	April 26, 2012	6.98
Becca is questioned by Ortega in a CIA facility in Vienna whom she still believes that Becca is a double agent. In a flashback, Becca describes Operation Songbird in 1999, during which she and Paul reunite a 12-year-old boy with his mother. At the reunion, the boy, named Maxim, grabs a gun, and shoots his mother dead and escapes. Ortega tells her that Maxim is the blonde sniper working with Azimoff. When Ortega leaves the interrogation room, a secret door opens, and Becca escapes. When Ortega returns, Violet reveals herself to be the double agent when she stabs and kills Ortega, and leaves through the door to set Becca up. Miller and Rossi believe Becca has killed Ortega. Meanwhile, Michael and Oksana jump off the train, and are finally safe, after Michael is able to kill the main henchman from the house. Oksana might die from lack of insulin, but she tells Michael he is a hero. Becca is on the run, with the sniper following her. Becca is unaware of Ortega's death.
8	"Answers"	Phil Abraham	Paul Redford	May 3, 2012	6.32
With Becca now a fugitive, she meets with Rossi at a station on the Vienna subway. Rossi ditches his wire and transmitter, and the CIA loses the tail. Becca regains Rossi's trust. Remembering details of an Azimoff phone conversation she overheard, they travel to a church to intercept Azimoff. The CIA gets a message about Michael. Meanwhile, Dax sends Martin Newman to Hungary, where Michael has taken Oksana to a hospital. Paul is at the church to exchange the second batch of stock certificates and his own life in exchange for Michael's freedom. Becca yells to Paul that Michael escaped. They escape from the church, and Paul explains he was working undercover years ago, and his cover was blown. There is a second stand-off. The blonde-haired sniper, who is Azimoff's son Maxim, kills Azimoff, instead of Paul. Maxim is remorseful about his life as Azimoff's hired killer. Maxim answers Azimoff's cellphone; Martin Newman is reporting to Azimoff that Michael has been recaptured. Martin Newman is the corrupt traitor and leader of the shadowy rogue group, referred to as Suspect Zero.
9	"Promise"	James Strong	James Parriott	May 10, 2012	6.37
Violet is surprised that Maxim killed Azimoff, and she kills Maxim. As Becca and Paul make their escape from the church, Becca sees Violet shoot Rossi. Rossi survives, and at the hospital, Violet tries to finish the job. Meanwhile, Martin Newman escorts Michael and Oksana to Istanbul, where Oksana discovers the truth about Martin. Martin warns her to keep quiet. Violet makes a failed attempt to kill Dax, and CIA agents arrest Violet for her traitorous activity with Martin Newman. Paul shows Becca some evidence of the crimes committed by Newman. Bulgarian border police warn Martin of Paul and Becca's arrival. Paul sees police converging on the car, which has had contraband planted in it. Paul is arrested; Becca evades arrest. Martin Newman tells his paid mercenary that Michael has become a liability. The mercenary is told to kill Michael when they leave Istanbul at the conclusion of their business. Michael has doubts about Martin, after the mercenary prevents Michael from taking a walk off the property. Martin awaits arrival of a buyer for some stolen nuclear material.
10	"Rain on the Evil and on the Good"	James Strong	Gregory Poirier	May 17, 2012	6.53
Dax manipulates Bulgarian officials to allow him into the jail where Paul is being held. Dax tells Paul to pistol-whip him and escape. Violet makes a failed escape attempt. After struggling to stay true to her personal values, Rebecca realizes the only way Violet will give up information is through torture. After a period of torture at Rebecca's hand, Violet reveals the location where Martin Newman will exchange the nuclear material. Turkish police provide backup, as Dax gives chase to decoy contraband couriers. Then realizing the true courier is a girl who posed as a tourist asking Martin a tourist question in the Hagia Sophia, Dax chases the girl and manages to recover the stolen nuclear material. Becca is finally reunited with Michael, who is surprised to see his father alive after all these years. Becca kills Martin in a shootout on the roof of a Turkish mosque. One week later. The reunited family of Becca, Paul and Michael, along with Oksana are vacationing in Prague. Becca teases Paul about not being able to take a bullet like he used to, and goes to retrieve their parked car. Suddenly, another car appears and smashes into the parked car Becca is in. There is no driver in the other car. Paul and Michael appear and the front window is smashed, and the driver's seat is splashed with blood. Becca is missing.

== Accolades ==
Award	Date of the ceremony	Category	Recipients	Result	Ref.
Primetime Emmy Awards	23 September 2012	Outstanding Lead Actress in a Limited or Anthology Series or Movie	Ashley Judd	nom	
Primetime Emmy Awards	23 September 2012	Outstanding Music Composition for a Limited or Anthology Series, Movie or Special (Original Dramatic Score)	Robert Duncan and Kim Planert	nom	

== International broadcasts ==
Country	Channel	Premiere date
Brazil	AXN	August 8, 2012
Poland	AXN	March 20, 2012
Portugal	AXN	April 19, 2012
Spain	AXN	April 12, 2012
Bulgaria; Czech Republic; Hungary; North Macedonia; Mexico; Romania; Serbia; Slovakia; Slovenia	AXN	March 15, 2012
Australia	Seven Network	May 1, 2012
Belgium	Eén	February 16, 2015
Canada	CTV, Z	March 15, 2012
Denmark	Kanal 5	December 2, 2012
France	France 4	February 7, 2013
Germany	VOX	November 4, 2013
India	STAR World	March 11, 2012^{1}
Israel	YES	April 5, 2012
Italy	Rai	April 30, 2012
Japan	Dlife	August 25, 2012
Lithuania	TV3 Lithuania	March 14, 2013
Malaysia	TV2	June 14, 2013
Middle East	OSN (censored)	
Netherlands	Net5	January 1, 2013
New Zealand	TV ONE	July 2, 2012
Norway	TVNorge	June 12, 2012
Philippines	FOX Asia	April 15, 2012
Russia	Channel One	August 5, 2012
Slovakia	TV JOJ	October 14, 2012
South Africa	MNET	April 7, 2012
Slovenia	POP TV	November 5, 2013
Sweden	Kanal 5	March 18, 2012
Thailand	MONO29	March 31, 2018
Turkey	FOX	January 9, 2013

== Other media ==
On March 22, 2012, the Disney-ABC Television Group announced the release of Missing: The Complete First Season on DVD, scheduled for June 12, 2012, in the United States and its territories, Canada, and Bermuda. The release includes all ten episodes of the series, along with bonus features such as deleted scenes, bloopers, Production Journal: Istanbul, and Genesis Piece, a behind-the-scenes segment in which producers Ashley Judd and Gina Matthews discuss the making of the series with creator Greg Poirier.

== Notes ==
1. The series had an early premiere in India on March 11, 2012 on STAR World.
