= Planert =

Planert is a surname. Notable people with the surname include:

- Kim Planert, German film and television composer
- Mandy Planert (born 1975), German slalom canoeist
- Ute Planert (born 1964), German historian
