= Soul on Fire =

- Theatrical release poster
- Directed by: Sean McNamara
- Written by: Gregory Poirier
- Based on: On Fire, The 7 Choices to Ignite a Radically Inspired Life by John O'Leary
- Produced by: J. Todd Harris; Margaret French Isaac; David Brookwell; Sean McNamara
- Starring: Joel Courtney; John Corbett; Stéphanie Szostak; Masey McLain; DeVon Franklin; William H. Macy
- Cinematography: Bob Hayes
- Edited by: Gregory Hobson
- Music by: Mark Isham
- Production companies: Affirm Films; Linda B. Huntington Productions; Branded Pictures Entertainment; Margaret French Isaac Entertainment; Brookwell McNamara Entertainment
- Distributed by: Sony Pictures Releasing
- Release date: October 10, 2025
- Running time: 112 minutes
- Country: United States
- Language: English
- Box office: $7.4 million

Soul on Fire is a 2025 American biographical drama film about John O'Leary, a real-life St. Louis native who survived fire burns which covered his entire body. It is directed by Sean McNamara, based on a screenplay by Gregory Poirier that adapted O'Leary's book On Fire, The 7 Choices to Ignite a Radically Inspired Life. The film stars Joel Courtney portraying O'Leary, along with John Corbett, Stéphanie Szostak, Masey McLain, DeVon Franklin, and William H. Macy.

It was released in the United States and Canada on October 10, 2025 by Sony Pictures Releasing.

== Cast ==
- Joel Courtney as John O'Leary
- John Corbett as Dennis O'Leary
- Stéphanie Szostak as Susan O'Leary
- Masey McLain as Beth O'Leary
- James McCracken as young John
- Spencer Milford as Mike
- Amanda Pulcini as Deanna
- Iyad Hajjaj as Dr. Ayvazian
- Mikey Cestone as Jim O’Leary
- Stella Bratcher as Amy O'Leary
- Lucy Panozzo as Susie O'Leary
- DeVon Franklin as nurse Roy
- William H. Macy as Jack Buck

== Production ==
In October 2023, it was announced that Macy, Corbett, Courtney and several other actors were cast in the film. Since the 2023 SAG-AFTRA strike was occurring at the time, the filmmakers were granted an interim agreement to allow the film to be made. Filming began in Missouri in November 2023. Filming specifically occurred in Maplewood, Missouri. Filming also took place in Saint Louis University. Modern day scenes were shot at the New Busch Stadium while older scenes use special effects to depict the circular shaped Busch Memorial Stadium, which had been demolished in 2005.

Mark Isham was hired to compose the score. Among the songs used in the soundtrack is "Wedding Song (There Is Love)" and "Soul on Fire" by Third Day.

== Release ==
Soul on Fire movie was released on October 10, 2025.

== Reception ==
=== Box office ===
In the United States and Canada, Soul on Fire grossed $7.4 million at the box office. It opened at No. 6, its first of two consecutive weeks in the Top 10 at the domestic box office.

=== Critical response ===
On the review aggregator website Rotten Tomatoes, 67% of 12 critics' reviews are positive, with an average rating of 5/10.
