= Ali Cobrin =

American actress (born 1989)

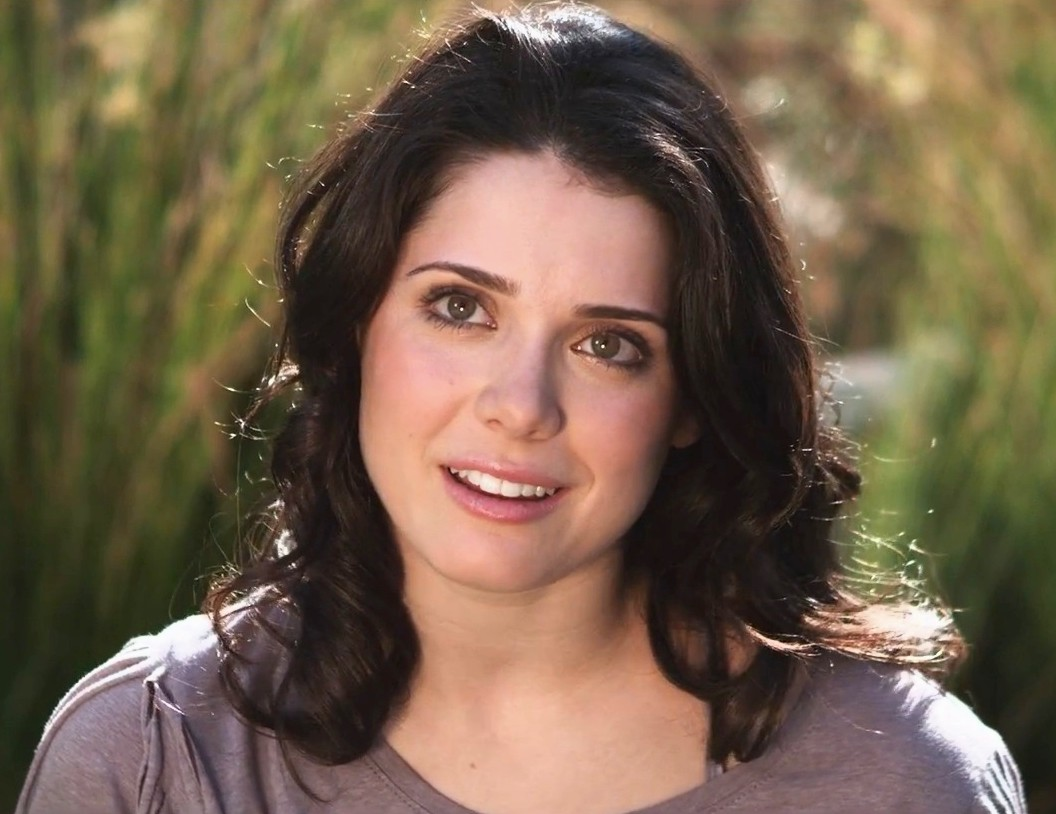
- Cobrin in Life's an Itch, 2012
- Born: Alexandra Arley Cobrin; July 21, 1989 (age 37); Chicago, Illinois, U.S.
- Occupation: Actress
- Years active: 2008–present
- Spouse: Zak Resnick (m. 2018)
- Children: 2

Alexandra Arley Cobrin (born July 21, 1989) is an American actress. She is best known for her roles as Molly on the Showtime series Look, Kara in the film American Reunion, Whitney in the film Neighbors, and Kari Baxter on the Amazon Prime series The Baxters.

== Early life ==
Alexandra Arley Cobrin was born on July 21, 1989 in Chicago, Illinois. She attended high school at the Chicago Academy for the Arts where she majored in musical theatre. Growing up, she trained to become a classical ballerina and competed in the Junior Olympics. Cobrin has one brother, and two half-sisters. She is of Jewish descent.

== Career ==
Cobrin began her entertainment career as an improvisation player in Second City's teen ensemble and danced with the Burklyn Ballet Theater touring Scotland, where she performed at the Edinburgh Fringe Festival. During that same time, Cobrin had workshopped Broadway musicals, including All That Jazz and Wonderland, which were directed by Ben Vereen and Frank Wildhorn, respectively. After graduating high school at the age of 17, Cobrin moved to Los Angeles, California, to pursue an acting career.

Upon moving to Los Angeles, Cobrin had her first film acting role in a 2008 short film entitled One. That same year, she starred in another short film called Jack Turner and the Reluctant Vampire, which won two awards in the Los Angeles Accolade Competition. In 2009, Cobrin had a supporting role in The Hole, a 3D film directed by Joe Dante. The film would win the first Premio Persol award for best 3-D movie at the 2009 Venice Film Festival. In 2010, Cobrin made her debut television appearance in Kings by Night, a comedy pilot for Spike TV, and Showtime's LOOK. Later that year, she had a lead actress role in the film Cold Cabin, and appeared opposite to rapper B.o.B in the Adidas Originals shoe campaign commercial, MEGA Diner. In 2011, she guest starred in the television series, Friends with Benefits.

In 2012, Cobrin played the role of Kara in American Reunion, a sequel in the original American Pie film series. The same year, she starred in Life’s an Itch.

In 2014, Cobrin portrayed Whitney in the film Neighbors, opposite Zac Efron and Seth Rogen. She also portrayed Joan in the drama thriller film Outlaw, directed by Todd Shields and Julia in the Michaël Nakache drama film Connected. In 2015, she portrayed Kylie Atkins in Trevor Matthews' horror thriller film Girl House, in which she co-starred with Slaine.

In 2024, she began playing Kari Baxter on the Amazon Prime series The Baxters, opposite Roma Downey and Ted McGinley as her parents. The Baxters ran for 3 seasons.

== Filmography ==
=== Film ===
Film
Year	Title	Role	Notes
2008	Jack Turner and the Reluctant Vampire	Val	Short film
2008	One	Jess	Short film
2009	The Hole	Tiffany	
2010	Cold Cabin	Kate	
2012	American Reunion	Kara	
2012	Life's an Itch	Gillian Gracin	
2014	Neighbors	Whitney	
2014	Girl House	Kylie Atkins	
2014	Lap Dance	Monica	
2014	A Beautiful Now	Tracey	
2014	Outlaw	Joan	
2015	Connected	Julia	Short film
2018	The Iron Orchard	Lee Montgomery	Co-star

=== Television ===
Television
Year	Title	Role	Notes
2010	Look: The Series	Molly	Main role; 11 episodes
2010	Kings by Night	Amber	Unaired Spike pilot
2011	Friends with Benefits	Hope Prater	Episode: "The Benefit of Being Shallow"
2015	The Unauthorized Melrose Place Story	Daphne Zuniga	Television film
2018	The Baxters	Kari Baxter	Television series
2018	Deadly Matrimony	Parker Wyndham	Television film
2020	My Birthday Romance	Callie	Television film
2024	The Baxters	Kari Baxter Jacobs	Main role; 34 episodes
2025	Sub/liminal		
