= Pilot (Missing) =

- Missing episode
- Episode no.: Season 1 Episode 1
- Directed by: Steve Shill
- Written by: Gregory Poirier
- Original air date: March 15, 2012

Episode chronology
← Previous —	Next → "The Hard Drive"

"Pilot" is the first episode of the first season of the ABC mystery drama, Missing. The episode premiered on March 1, 2012 in the United States and various other countries. In India, the episode premiered on STAR World, with an early premiere on March 11, 2012. In the episode, 18-year-old, Michael Winstone goes to Europe for an architecture program, and is Michael doesn't call home in over a week, Rebecca Winstone goes to Europe, to find her missing child.

The episode was written by Gregory Poirier and directed by Steve Shill.

"Pilot" revived mixed to positive reviews from media critics. Upon airing, the pilot episode garnered 10.60 million viewers and a 2.1 rating in the 18–49 demographic, according to Nielsen ratings.

== Plot ==
The episode begins with the scene from ten years ago, with Paul Wilstone in the car that was about to get bombed, he said to younger-aged Michael, "Hey, you left you soccer ball inside, do you want to go in and get it", the Micheal goes in to get the ball, when as he starts walking back, the car is bombed, while Micheal runs towards him, someone grabs him, and doesn't allow him to run, because this may of injured him.

Paul Winstone (Sean Bean) is car-bombed in Europe. Ten years later, son Michael Winstone goes to Europe for an architecture program. When Michael doesn't call home in over a week, Rebecca Winstone goes to Europe. After she kills one foreign spy, the CIA becomes alert to her activities. Recognizing an Italian street in one of her son's cellphone photos, she breaks into a jewelry store, to view the store's video surveillance records of that street. Her old spy sources trace the tag number of a truck in the security footage, to a warehouse in France. The CIA intercepts her on the train to France. She is questioned by CIA bureau chief Dax Miller. CIA headquarters orders him to send her back to the United States. However, he gives her three hours to uncover information. She breaks into the French warehouse; She finds photos which reveal that her son has been tracked for years. She finds evidence that Michael was there. After She fights an armed guard, she makes an telephone transmission to Agent Miller; A CIA team is dispatched to the warehouse. They find a note from Rebecca, which reads: "He was here."

The episode ends with Becca in a river, the water cloudy with her blood, when an unknown suspect shoots Rebecca into the lake.

== Production ==
=== Casting ===
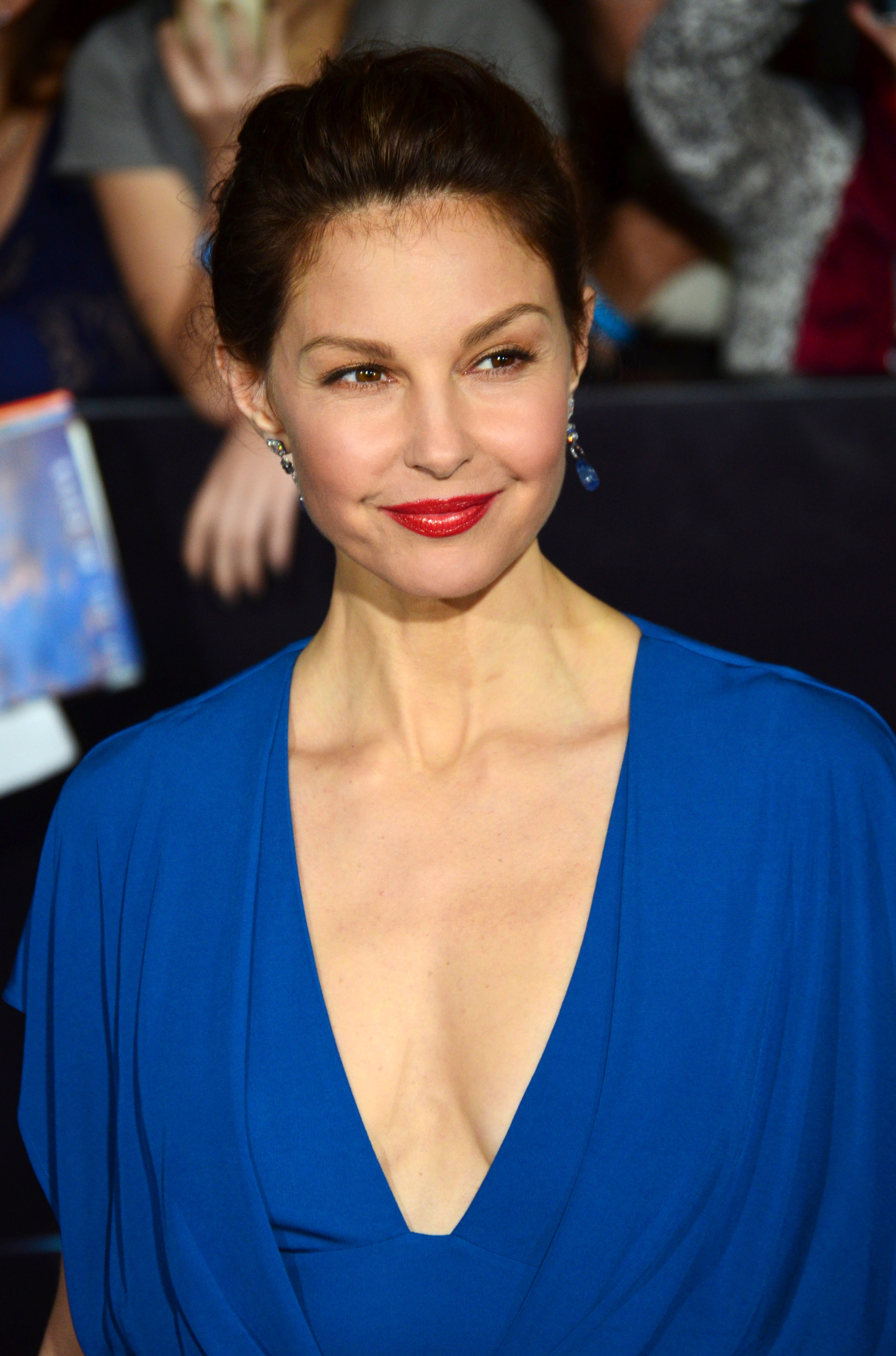
Ashley Judd was the first actor to be cast in the series

In March 2011, Ashley Judd obtained the role of Rebecca Winstone, the central character of the series.

=== Writing ===
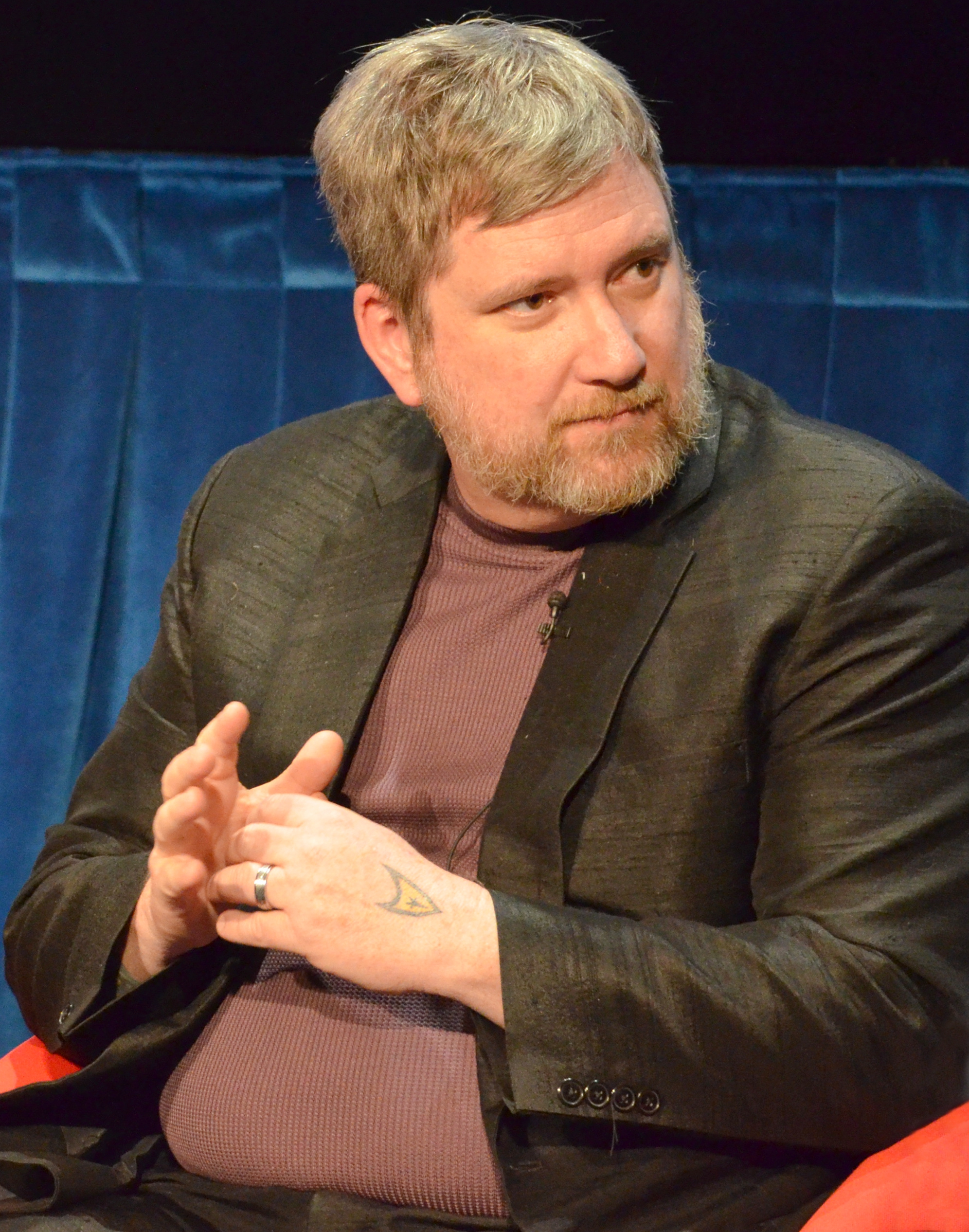
Gregory Poirier created the series and wrote the episode

The episode was written by Gregory Poirier and directed by Steve Shill.

== Reception ==
=== Ratings ===
"Pilot" was originally broadcast on March 15, 2012 in the United States on ABC. Upon airing, the pilot episode garnered 10.60 million viewers despite airing simultaneously with popular series, American Idol on the Fox network. It acquired a 2.1 rating and a 6 share in the 18–49 demographic, according to Nielsen ratings, meaning that it was seen by 2.1% of all 18- to 49-year-olds.

=== Critical response ===
"Pilot" revived mixed to positive reviews from media critics. Many critics praised Judd's conformance, with The Hollywood Reporter saying that "Judd grows on you."
