= Girl House =

- Film poster
- Directed by: Trevor Matthews; Jon Knautz
- Written by: Nick Gordon
- Story by: Trevor Matthews
- Produced by: Trevor Matthews; Nick Gordon; Cory Neal
- Starring: Ali Cobrin; Adam DiMarco; Slaine
- Cinematography: Christopher Norr
- Edited by: Matthew Brulotte
- Music by: Tomandandy
- Production company: Brookstreet Pictures
- Distributed by: Entertainment One
- Release date: October 16, 2014
- Running time: 100 minutes
- Country: Canada
- Language: English

Girl House is a 2014 Canadian horror slasher film directed by Trevor Matthews and written by Nick Gordon. It stars Ali Cobrin as a young woman in an X-rated reality web series and Slaine as the psychopath who stalks her.

== Plot ==
In Rehobeth, Alabama, 1988, two girls trick an overweight boy, whom they nickname Loverboy, into dropping his pants and preparing for a kiss, only to tease and humiliate him. When one of the girls rides home alone later, Loverboy knocks her from her bicycle, then throws both her and the bicycle off a bridge.

In the present day, Kylie Atkins, a college student struggling to pay tuition, is recruited by entrepreneur Gary Preston into Girl House, his online pornography venture. Registered customers can watch the girls living inside the titular house through 24/7 camera feeds. The girls perform regular daily activities, with occasional stripteases or sexual acts for additional money. Gary assures Kylie that the house's actual location is untraceable. Kylie is introduced to security guards Steve and Big Mike, as well as fellow Girl House residents Kat, Devon, Janet, Heather, and Mia.

Kylie's first striptease captures the attention of Loverboy, a Girl House regular. Also watching are Alex and his college roommate Ben Stanley, who recognizes Kylie as his kindergarten crush. Former Girl House participant Anna, banned for her heroin addiction, returns to the house and begs Gary for another chance. Kylie has a private chat session with Loverboy, who surprises her with a picture of his face. Anna later finds the picture while snooping on Kylie's laptop. Ben pursues Kylie and they begin a relationship, which continues after he admits to knowing her involvement with Girl House.

The women in Girl House are annoyed with Loverboy, who continually asks for Kylie, and start making fun of him. They put his picture with a handwritten caption that reads "What a stud" on the bulletin board. Kylie takes down the picture as soon as she sees it.

Eventually, Loverboy snaps. He breaks into the place housing the website's server and kills the technical team. Gary is strapped to a chair and stabbed multiple times. Dying from blood loss, Gary is forced to watch Loverboy's rampage unfolding at the House.

Loverboy kills Steve at the security gatehouse, then strangles Anna. From his dorm room, Alex watches in horror as Loverboy mutilates Devon's face with a small knife and chops off all her fingers with an axe. Alex alerts Ben, who calls 911 and tries to warn Kylie but in vain, as Loverboy jams incoming and outgoing communications. Ben instructs Alex to try locating Girl House's address.

An oblivious Kylie retires to her room. Meanwhile, Loverboy kills Heather and her boyfriend while they are having sex. Janet, who witnesses Loverboy severing the boyfriend's head, is chased down and thrown off an upstairs railing. She survives with broken legs. Loverboy locks Mia in the sauna room. She escapes to the pool outside, only to be killed with a sledgehammer.

Kylie spots Loverboy at the pool from her window and realizes she is in danger. Janet unsuccessfully attacks Loverboy and gets stabbed in the head.

Kylie finds Kat and tries to hide in her bedroom. Loverboy breaks in and corners Kylie, who now recognizes him. Kat knocks Loverboy briefly unconscious and goes for help while Kylie looks for Devon. Kat meets Big Mike at the front door, but Loverboy pursues and kills them both. Kylie finds Devon and tells her to stay in her bedroom while she searches for help. Distraught over her disfigurement, Devon suffocates herself with a plastic bag. Ben, together with Kylie's friend Liz Owens, finds the house's real address and races there.

Loverboy chases Kylie throughout the house. She shuts off all of the cameras. She then lures Loverboy to a darkened basement where she uses a video camera's night vision to help her stab him in the stomach with a pool stick. Injured, Loverboy overpowers and begins to strangle her, but she ends up clubbing him to death with the camera.

As Alex watches on, he vows never to go into another online pornography site again and to seek therapy. Kylie runs outside the house, where Ben and Liz show up with the police and a news crew following behind. A traumatized Kylie tearfully begs Ben to stop the reporters from filming her, to which he complies. The film ends with Kylie breathing deeply and the screen cuts to black.

== Cast ==
- Ali Cobrin as Kylie Atkins
- Adam DiMarco as Ben Stanley
- Slaine as Loverboy
  - Isaac Faulkner as Young Loverboy
- James Thomas as Gary Preston
- Chasty Ballesteros as Janet
- Alice Hunter as Kat
- Alyson Bath as Devon
- Elysia Rotaru as Heather
- Nicole Fox as Mia
- Zuleyka Silver as Anna
- Erin Agostino as Liz Owens
- Wesley MacInnes as Alex
- Camren Bicondova as The Queen

== Production ==
Director-producer Matthews came up with the idea while attempting to find a distributor for The Shrine. After realizing that he had not seen themes of pornography and privacy explored in a slasher film, he recruited Gordon to write the script. The story was always important to Mathews, and he said that he was very enthused with the project when he read Gordon's script. Though it was his first film, Matthews said that his experiences with previous productions had been collaborative enough that it seemed like a natural step for him. Jon Knautz initially co-directed the film, but Knautz got an offer to direct another project. Matthews encouraged him to take the opportunity and finished directing the film himself. Matthews was influenced by Halloween and used that film's structure as a guide. He said that the film serves as a cautionary tale about over-sharing on social media. Slaine said that the mask he wore was very uncomfortable, and it could only be put on or taken off with help. As a result, the mask had to stay on for extended periods during shooting. Slaine attempted to channel events from his own life into his performance to heighten the emotional impact and make his character more sympathetic. Cobrin said that she experienced some trepidation about her role, but her fondness for slasher films made it easier. Shooting took place in Kanata, Ontario.

== Release ==
Girl House played at the Ottawa International Film Festival on October 16, 2014. Lakeshore Records released the soundtrack by tomandandy on February 10, 2015, and Entertainment One released the film to video on demand on February 13, 2015.

== Reception ==
Rotten Tomatoes, a review aggregator, reports that 73% of 11 surveyed critics gave the film a positive review; the average rating is 5.58/10. Frank Scheck of The Hollywood Reporter wrote, "Director Trevor Matthews stages the violent mayhem with admirable profiency, and the film's target audience is bound to come away reasonably satisfied, if not fully satiated." Maitland McDonagh of Film Journal International described it as a "formulaic but slickly executed thriller that should entertain undemanding genre buffs". Michael Gingold of Fangoria rated it 2/4 stars and wrote of the film's satiric content, "Too often, though, the moviemakers fall back on grisly, gamy sensationalism." Pat Torfe of Bloody Disgusting rated it 3.5/5 stars and wrote, "Boasting some strong acting from almost everyone involved, coupled with a scary antagonist and some genuinely brutal moments that gorehounds will love, Girl House is definitely one of the stronger slasher films I've recently seen." Scott Hallam of Dread Central rated it 3.5/5 stars and wrote, "For a directorial debut, Trevor Matthews does a fantastic job. The movie is slick looking, nicely paced, and keeps the audience's attention at all times." Brian Formo of IGN rated it 7/10 stars and wrote, "It's an imperfect debut, but it shows promise."
