= Knox Goes Away =

2023 film by Michael Keaton

- Theatrical release poster
- Directed by: Michael Keaton
- Written by: Gregory Poirier
- Produced by: Trevor Matthews; Nick Gordon; Michael Sugar; Ashley Zalta; Michael Keaton
- Starring: Michael Keaton; James Marsden; Suzy Nakamura; Joanna Kulig; Ray McKinnon; John Hoogenakker; Lela Loren; Marcia Gay Harden; Al Pacino
- Cinematography: Marshall Adams
- Edited by: Jessica Hernández
- Music by: Alex Heffes
- Production companies: Brookstreet Pictures; Sugar23
- Distributed by: Saban Films (United States); FilmNation Entertainment (International)
- Release dates: September 10, 2023 (TIFF); March 15, 2024 (United States)
- Running time: 114 minutes
- Country: United States
- Language: English
- Box office: $951,489

Knox Goes Away (known in some markets as A Killer's Memory or Assassin's Plan) is a 2023 American crime thriller film produced and directed by Michael Keaton and written by Gregory Poirier. It stars Keaton in the title role, with James Marsden, Suzy Nakamura, Joanna Kulig, Ray McKinnon, John Hoogenakker, Lela Loren, Marcia Gay Harden and Al Pacino in supporting roles. It follows a contract killer (Keaton) with a rapidly evolving form of dementia who vows to spend his final days attempting to find redemption by saving the life of his estranged adult son (Marsden).

The film had its world premiere at the 48th Toronto International Film Festival on September 10, 2023, and was theatrically released in the United States on March 15, 2024, by Saban Films.

== Plot ==
John Knox works a day-to-day job as a contract killer employed by Jericho, a crime boss. He is estranged from his wife and son, and lives alone, interacting only with other members of his industry and Annie, the Polish sex worker who visits him once a week, and who shares his love for books.

John is diagnosed with an aggressive form of Creutzfeldt–Jakob disease, and quickly makes arrangements to retire from the business. Before he retires, however, he undertakes one last job with his partner, Thomas Muncie.

During the job, after successfully killing his target but also unintentionally killing the woman who is with him in the shower, John accidentally kills Muncie in his dementia-fueled confusion. He quickly stages the scene and leaves. The next night, he is unexpectedly visited by his estranged son Miles, who tearfully admits to killing a man for raping his daughter, John's granddaughter. John instructs his son to remain quiet to the authorities as he goes to the crime scene and meticulously removes evidence that may incriminate Miles, while mysteriously storing them for later use. Meanwhile, dogged detective Emily Ikari is on both murder cases, determined to find the perpetrators.

John visits his friend Xavier Crane, a former thief. Together, they devise a plan to set up John's family for life while leaving the business behind, all while John battles his fading mental state.

Meanwhile, Detective Ikari links both crimes to a single perpetrator. She interrogates John to no effect. He plants the evidence that he had previously stored away around his son Miles's home, seemingly betraying him. Miles is arrested for the murder of his daughter's rapist, and is confronted by John in prison, where John accuses Miles of turning him in for a tax evasion case several years prior.

After getting lost in the woods while digging up his stash of diamonds at a cabin that his family used to own, John is picked up by Crane and driven home. On arriving, he is confronted by three burglars led by Annie, who has betrayed John after becoming aware of his dementia and the fact that he had been cashing out. Killing the three burglars, John confronts Annie at gunpoint, and when she confesses that she was expecting to get a quarter of the shares from her gang's botched robbery, John scoffs at her, revealing that she was one of the three beneficiaries in his will, and would have legitimately received a third of his fortune had she remained loyal.

Despondent, John calls Xavier, who wishes him fortune before informing the police of part of their plan, after which he is arrested by Detective Ikari. The police soon discover signs that the evidence found at Miles Knox's house may have been tampered with and planted by John, leading to the conclusion that John might have framed his son for the murder. When asked by Ikari on a possible motive, Miles, recalling his father's accusation of him in prison, responds accordingly, fully shifting the blame to John. Miles is released.

Several weeks later, Miles visits his father in prison. John, having now fully lost his mental faculties, does not recognize his son and is soon moved from prison to a medical facility with only weeks to live. Miles and his mother receive equal shares of John's fortune, ensuring the completion of his retirement plan. Annie, who is spared, receives John's library, opening the cover of A Tale of Two Cities.

== Cast ==
- Michael Keaton as John "Aristotle" Knox
- James Marsden as Miles Knox
- Suzy Nakamura as Detective Emily Ikari
- Joanna Kulig as Annie
- Ray McKinnon as Thomas Muncie
- John Hoogenakker as Detective Rale
- Lela Loren as Cheryl Knox
- Marcia Gay Harden as Ruby Knox
- Al Pacino as Xavier Crane
- Dennis Dugan as Philo Jones
- Jay Paulson as Detective Gelfuso
- Paul Perri as Dr. Burns
- Edwin Garcia II as Elian Zubiri
- Nicole Reddinger as Annette Elmora
- Charles Bisset as Andrew Palmer
- Martin Garcia as Daniel Warren
- Morgan Bastin as Kaylee Knox
- Natasha Galano as Margaret Pierce
- Rena Bobbs as Nicole Richardson
- Chad Donella as Jordan Moore
- Marisa Echeverria as Bianca Delgado
- Gugun Deep Singh as John Bustamonte

== Production ==
In May 2022, it was announced that Michael Keaton was set to star in and direct Knox Goes Away. The film was produced by Brookstreet Pictures's Trevor Matthews and Nick Gordon, Sugar23's Michael Sugar and Ashley Zalta, along with Keaton. Principal photography wrapped in December 2022, after 25 days of shooting.

Keaton shared his views on directing himself in the lead role:

There are a lot of pluses to directing yourself. You have a head start and a big advantage in terms of time — there's less discussion because you don't have to have the discussion with yourself. There's a lot of wasted time on movie sets, and the energy just gets bogged down. You've got to keep the pace up so people don't get bored.

== Release ==
Knox Goes Away premiered in the Special Presentations section of the 48th Toronto International Film Festival on September 10, 2023. International sales were handled by FilmNation Entertainment. In November 2023, Saban Films acquired U.S distribution rights to the film. The first trailer was released on February 14, 2024, and the film opened in theaters on March 15. It was released on digital platforms on May 21, 2024, and on Blu-ray and DVD a week later by Lionsgate Home Entertainment. It debuted on Max on July 26, 2024.

== Reception ==
=== Critical response ===
On the review aggregator website Rotten Tomatoes, 66% of 80 critics' reviews are positive, with an average rating of 5.9/10. The website's consensus reads: "Michael Keaton directs Michael Keaton in Knox Goes Away, and gets a terrific performance out of himself — albeit one that's left stranded by an underwhelming screenplay." Metacritic, which uses a weighted average, assigned the film a score of 54 out of 100, based on 19 critics, indicating "mixed or average" reviews.

Owen Gleiberman of Variety gave the film a very positive review, calling it "a silky and entrancing thriller". Gleiberman also wrote, "Keaton gives a beautifully psychological performance […]. The script, by Gregory Poirier, is tautly clever and original, and Keaton directs it with a cunning and skill that are quietly hypnotic."

Jeannette Catsoulis of The New York Times remarked, "Knox Goes Away is, like its antihero, smart, unconventional and almost obsessively careful. Its unhurried pacing and mood of quiet deliberation won't be for everyone; but this low-key thriller resolves its shockingly high stakes with a twisty intelligence."

Robert Abele of the Los Angeles Times stated, "Knox Goes Away should be noirishly enjoyable hokum. But instead, screenwriter Gregory Poirier's tribute to an earlier era's taciturn machismo is more muddled and ludicrous than fleet and clever."

Frank Scheck of The Hollywood Reporter commented, "The convoluted storyline is too clever by far, and might have proved entertaining if the film had been intended as an absurdist black comedy. Unfortunately, Keaton goes in a more neo-noir direction."

Esther Zuckerman of IndieWire gave the film a grade of "C-" and opined, "One just gets the sense that Knox Goes Away is unsure of what it's supposed to be. On one hand, it leans into the chillingly gruesome; on the other, it wants to laugh at the grimness of its own scenarios."

Robert Daniels of RogerEbert.com gave it 1 star out of 4, and wrote, "These glaring shortcomings and clumsy missteps would be fine if this film weren't so garish to look at. Flat photography and ungainly cuts undo the few moments where Keaton deploys himself to dispatch some goons."

=== Accolades ===
Year	Award	Category	Nominee(s)	Result	Ref.
2023	California On Location Awards	Location Team of the Year – Independent Feature Film	Rob Frank, Remy Elles, Sean Hernandez, Sheila Ryan-Cruz, Jeanie Farnam, Jonah Smith, and Eduardo Rickettes	Nominated	
