= Brookstreet Pictures =

Film production company

- Type: Private
- Industry: Film
- Founded: Ottawa, Ontario, Canada (2004)
- Headquarters: Beverly Hills, California, US
- Area served: Worldwide
- Key people: Trevor Matthews, Founder and CEO; Terry Matthews, Chairman of the Board
- Products: Motion pictures
- Owner: Wesley Clover
- Website: brookstreetpictures.com

Brookstreet Pictures is a film production company with offices in West Hollywood, California and Ottawa, Ontario. Founded by Trevor Matthews in 2004, the company produces and finances films.

== Filmography ==
=== As production company ===
Year	Film title	Co-production companies	Distributor(s)
2004	Teen Massacre	N/A	N/A
2005	Still Life	N/A	N/A
2005	The Other Celia	N/A	N/A
2007	Moment of Truth	N/A	N/A
2007	Jack Brooks: Monster Slayer	Sound Venture Productions	Kinosmith (Canada); Anchor Bay Entertainment (United States)
2010	Old West	N/A	N/A
2015	Girl House	N/A	Entertainment One
2017	First Kill	Grindstone Entertainment Group; Emmett/Furla/Oasis Films	Lionsgate Premiere
2018	O.G.	N/A	HBO
2018	Skin	N/A	A24
2020	Brothers by Blood	N/A	Vertical Entertainment
2021	The Forgiven	N/A	Roadside Attractions; Vertical Entertainment (North America); Focus Features; Universal Pictures (International)
2023	Knox Goes Away	Sugar23	Saban Films (United States); FilmNation Entertainment (International)
2024	The Brutalist	Andrew Lauren Productions; Yellow Bear; Intake Films; Killer Films; Protagonist Pictures; Three Six Zero Group; Proton Cinema	A24 (United States); Focus Features; Universal Pictures (International)
TBA	Love Is Not the Answer	2AM; Mirador Pictures; Evania; IPR.VC; TPC	

=== As distributor ===
Year	Film title	Co-production companies	Distributor(s)
2010	The Shrine	N/A	N/A
