= Masey McLain =

American actress (born 1994)

- Born: Masey Renee McLain; January 6, 1994 (age 32); Vidalia, Georgia, U.S.
- Occupation: Actor
- Years active: 2011–present
- Notable work: I'm Not Ashamed; Because of Grácia; The Baxters; It's Worth It; If You're Gone; "God Only Knows" music video
- Spouse: Caleb Stanley (m. 2018)

Masey Renee Stanley (née McLain; born January 6, 1994) is an American actress who starred in I'm Not Ashamed, a 2016 film. She played the part of Rachel Scott, who was killed in the Columbine High School massacre. As well as her movie roles, McLain is also a published author and appeared in the music video "God Only Knows". The song, popularized by For King & Country, won the 2020 Grammy Award for Best Contemporary Christian Music Performance/Song.

== Early life ==
Masey McLain was born on January 6, 1994, in Vidalia, Georgia; McLain's parents are Stephanie and Marty McLain. Her father is a Baptist minister at a Georgia church. At the age of seven, she became a born-again Christian, later becoming interested in acting as a 15-year old in high school. In an interview, she credited her mother's background as an accomplished singer and dancer for her own interest in the stage. After graduation from high school, she attended Kennesaw State University. McLain married Caleb Stanley, a writer and co-founder of a movement called "The Alternative", in 2019.

== Professional career ==
=== Films ===
In 2016, McLain was cast in the starring role of Rachel Scott in the feature-length film, I'm Not Ashamed. Scott was a student killed in the Columbine High School massacre on April 20, 1999. At the time of the film's production, McLain was in her senior year at Kennesaw State University. In preparing for her role in I'm Not Ashamed, McLain read Scott's journals and talked to the slain girl's mother. In an interview, McLain said that she could relate to her character's Christian faith and found the shooting scene to be a spiritual experience. After the film's release, McLain said, "I love acting in films, but to be a part of a film that is having an impact in people's hearts around the world is above and beyond anything I could have ever expected". The film has since been released on DVD, including German and French versions.

The next year, McLain appeared in the teen movie, Because of Grácia. The 2017 film deals with the trials and tribulations of various teens navigating relationships in high school. In 2018, she had the female lead in the film, If You're Gone, about a high school senior whose boyfriend mysteriously disappears. The disappearance results in her character's spiraling into deep depression and even questioning her faith in God. The film was based on the popular Christy Award-winning novel of that name by Brittany Goodwin. If You're Gone was released on DVD in 2019.

=== Author ===
McLain wrote the book, It's Worth It, in 2017. Based on her spiritual faith journey, it is a devotional guide geared to high school-age youth.

=== Television and music video ===
McLain has a recurring role as Ashley Baxter in the Lightworkers Media-produced television series The Baxters, based on the novels of Karen Kingsbury and starring Roma Downey. She is also featured in the music video "God Only Knows". The song was produced in 2019 by For King & Country and won the 2020 Grammy Award for Best Contemporary Christian Music Performance/Song. In the music video, McLain portrays a despairing young woman driven to consider suicide, who then finds hope.

== Filmography ==
=== Film ===
Year	Title	Role	Notes
2011	Surrendered: The Story of Jay Harding	Kate	
2016	Christine	Young Woman	
2016	I'm Not Ashamed	Rachel Scott	
2017	Because of Grácia	Amy	
2019	If You're Gone	Lillian White	
2025	Soul on Fire	Beth O'Leary	

=== Television ===
Year	Title	Role	Notes
2011	Reed Between the Lines	Maria	Episode: "Let's Talk About Competition"
2018	The Resident	Daisy	Episode: "Independence Day"
2019	Vindication	Courtney	Episode: "A Name and Numbers"
2024	The Baxters	Ashley Baxter	Main role

== Awards and reviews ==
Although Guardian film critic Jordan Hoffman generally panned I'm Not Ashamed, he praised McLain's acting, saying she was the film's "saving grace" and "a terrific, warm and engaging performer", concluding that "the sky is the limit" for her future in acting. Writing in The Christian Index, editor Gerald Harris called her, "...a gifted actor, charming in every way, and certainly sincere in her faith".

She was nominated for Best Supporting Actress in 2017 for her role in the film Because of Grácia at the Great Lakes Christian Film Festival. Of her acting in the 2018 film, If You're Gone, a reviewer said McLain, "really shines ... You feel her joy, her sadness, and her grief as she portrays this character".
