= The Baxters (2024 TV series) =

American family drama television series

- Genre: Family drama
- Based on: Redemption series by Karen Kingsbury
- Developed by: Roma Downey
- Directed by: Rachel Feldman; Tony Mitchell; Alex Zamm
- Starring: Roma Downey; Ted McGinley; Ali Cobrin; Masey McLain; Josh Plasse; Reilly Anspaugh; Emily Peterson; Cassidy Gifford; Jake Allyn
- Country of origin: United States
- Original language: English
- No. of seasons: 3
- No. of episodes: 34

Production
- Executive producers: Roma Downey; Jessie Rosen; Will Packer; Sheila Ducksworth; Kevin Mann; Brendan Bragg; Jaime Primak Sullivan
- Producer: Roma Downey
- Running time: 22 minutes
- Production companies: LightWorkers Media; Will Packer Media; Haven Entertainment; Amazon MGM Studios

Original release
- Network: Prime Video
- Release: March 28, 2024

The Baxters is an American faith-based family drama television series, based on the Redemption book series by Karen Kingsbury, developed by Roma Downey, and streamed on Prime Video on March 28, 2024.

The cast includes Roma Downey, Ted McGinley, and Ali Cobrin. Kathie Lee Gifford guest stars.

== Synopsis ==
The series follows Elizabeth and John Baxter and their five adult children as they go through various life learning journeys. The strength of family bonds will be tested time and time again. Love and their evangelical Christian faith allow them to find each other.

== Cast ==
- Roma Downey as Elizabeth Baxter
- Ted McGinley as John Baxter
- Ali Cobrin as Kari Baxter Jacobs
- Masey McLain as Ashley Baxter
- Josh Plasse as Luke Baxter
- Reilly Anspaugh as Erin Baxter Hogan
- Emily Peterson as Brooke Baxter West
- Cassidy Gifford as Reagan Peters
- Jake Allyn as Ryan Taylor
- Orel De La Mota as Landon Blake
- Loren Escandon as Pastor Mariana
- Jake Farree as Sam Hogan
- Jaclyn Chantell as Erika
- Alexa Sutherland as Lori Callahan
- Asher Morrissette as Cole Baxter
- Brandon Hirsch as Tim Jacobs
- Taylour Paige as Angela Manning
- Kai Caster as Dirk Bennett
- Eve Sigall as Irvel

== Episodes ==
=== Series overview ===
Season	Episodes	Originally released
1	10	March 28, 2024
2	12	March 28, 2024
3	12	March 28, 2024

=== Season 1 (2024) ===
No. overall	No. in season	Title	Directed by	Written by	Original release date
1	1	"Under the Surface"	Rachel Feldman	Christina de Leon & Marilyn Fu & Olumide Odebunmi	March 28, 2024
2	2	"Homecoming"	Rachel Feldman	Christina de Leon	March 28, 2024
3	3	"Irreconcilable Differences"	Rachel Feldman	Olumide Odebunmi	March 28, 2024
4	4	"In Hindsight"	Rachel Feldman	Marilyn Fu	March 28, 2024
5	5	"In the Heat of"	Tony Mitchell	Justin D. James	March 28, 2024
6	6	"For Better or Worse"	Tony Mitchell	Justin D. James	March 28, 2024
7	7	"Old Wounds"	Tony Mitchell	Justin D. James	March 28, 2024
8	8	"Food for Thought"	Tony Mitchell	Justin D. James & Jessie Rosen	March 28, 2024
9	9	"There's Someone at the Door"	Tony Mitchell	Justin D. James	March 28, 2024
10	10	"A Guide to Guilt"	Tony Mitchell	Justin D. James	March 28, 2024

=== Season 2 (2024) ===
No. overall	No. in season	Title	Directed by	Written by	Original release date
11	1	"Blank Canvas"	Unknown	Unknown	March 28, 2024
12	2	"The Easy Part"	Unknown	Unknown	March 28, 2024
13	3	"Erin's Birthday"	Unknown	Unknown	March 28, 2024
14	4	"One Step Forward"	Unknown	Unknown	March 28, 2024
15	5	"Memory Box"	Unknown	Unknown	March 28, 2024
16	6	"Allure"	Unknown	Unknown	March 28, 2024
17	7	"When the Smoke Clears"	Unknown	Unknown	March 28, 2024
18	8	"Paris"	Unknown	Unknown	March 28, 2024
19	9	"Broken Pieces"	Unknown	Unknown	March 28, 2024
20	10	"Say a Little Prayer"	Unknown	Unknown	March 28, 2024
21	11	"Waiting for Wings"	Unknown	Unknown	March 28, 2024
22	12	"It's Not Perfect"	Unknown	Unknown	March 28, 2024

=== Season 3 (2024) ===
No. overall	No. in season	Title	Directed by	Written by	Original release date
23	1	"New Beginnings"	Unknown	Unknown	March 28, 2024
24	2	"Cautionary Tale"	Unknown	Unknown	March 28, 2024
25	3	"A Sisters Trip"	Unknown	Unknown	March 28, 2024
26	4	"The Moment of Truth"	Unknown	Unknown	March 28, 2024
27	5	"A Step Forward"	Unknown	Unknown	March 28, 2024
28	6	"Unexpected Guest"	Unknown	Unknown	March 28, 2024
29	7	"Grief and Joy"	Unknown	Unknown	March 28, 2024
30	8	"A Protest"	Unknown	Unknown	March 28, 2024
31	9	"Lost and Found"	Unknown	Unknown	March 28, 2024
32	10	"An Urgent Message"	Unknown	Unknown	March 28, 2024
33	11	"God Made Us Three"	Unknown	Jessie Rosen	March 28, 2024
34	12	"Return Together"	Alex Zamm	Jessie Rosen	March 28, 2024

== Production ==
Roma Downey worked on developing the series for a decade after acquiring the option to the books.

Rachel Feldman and Tony Mitchell directed the series.

== Release ==
All three seasons were released at the same time on March 28, 2024.
