= Brothers by Blood =

American 2020 crime drama film

- Official poster
- Directed by: Jeremie Guez
- Screenplay by: Jeremie Guez
- Based on: Brotherly Love by Pete Dexter
- Produced by: Aimee Buidine; Julien Madon; Christine Vachon; David Hinojosa; Trevor Matthews; Nick Gordon; Jeremie Guez
- Starring: Matthias Schoenaerts; Joel Kinnaman; Maika Monroe; Paul Schneider; Nicholas Crovetti; Ryan Phillippe
- Cinematography: Menno Mans
- Edited by: Damien Keyeux; Brett M. Reed
- Music by: Séverin Favriau
- Production companies: Cheyenne Films; Killer Films; Brookstreet Pictures; Canal+; Cine+; OCS; Wallimage; Endeavor Content; Gapbusters; Shelter Productions; Halal; RTBF; BeTV
- Distributed by: Vertical Entertainment (United States); The Jokers Films (France); Cinéart (Belgium/Netherlands)
- Release dates: September 8, 2020 (Deauville); January 22, 2021 (United States)
- Running time: 90 minutes
- Countries: United States; France; Belgium; Netherlands
- Language: English

Brothers by Blood (originally known as The Sound of Philadelphia) is a 2020 crime drama film written, directed, and produced by Jeremie Guez, based on the 1991 novel Brotherly Love by Pete Dexter. It stars Matthias Schoenaerts, Joel Kinnaman, Maika Monroe, Paul Schneider, Nicholas Crovetti and Ryan Phillippe.

The film had its world premiere at the Deauville Film Festival on September 8, 2020. It was released on January 22, 2021, by Vertical Entertainment.

== Plot ==
A man remains tormented by his sister's death, while his cousin grows more powerful in the hierarchy of the family crime business.

== Cast ==
- Matthias Schoenaerts as Peter Flood
  - Nicholas Crovetti as Young Peter Flood
- Joel Kinnaman as Michael Flood
- Maika Monroe as Grace
- Paul Schneider as Jimmy
- Ryan Phillippe as Charley Flood
- Felix Scott as Phil Flood
- James Nelson-Joyce as Leonard
- Antoni Corone as Bono
- Carlos Schram as Carlos
- Tarek Hamite as Ryan

== Production ==
It was announced in May 2018 that Matthias Schoenaerts, Garrett Hedlund and Scoot McNairy were cast to star in the film, which was due to begin filming in August in Philadelphia. In February 2019, it was announced Joel Kinnaman, Ryan Phillippe Paul Schneider and Maika Monroe were also joining, while Hedlund and McNairy would not star in the film.

Filming began by March 2019 in New York City.

== Release ==
The film had its world premiere at the Deauville Film Festival on September 8, 2020. It was previously set to have its world premiere at the Tribeca Film Festival on April 19, 2020, prior to the festival's cancellation due to the COVID-19 pandemic. In November 2020, Vertical Entertainment acquired U.S. distribution rights to the film and released on January 22, 2021
