= American Reunion =

2012 film by Jon Hurwitz and Hayden Schlossberg

- Theatrical release poster mirroring that of the 1999 film
- Directed by: Jon Hurwitz; Hayden Schlossberg
- Written by: Jon Hurwitz; Hayden Schlossberg
- Based on: Characters created by Adam Herz
- Produced by: Chris Moore; Craig Perry; Adam Herz; Warren Zide
- Starring: Jason Biggs; Alyson Hannigan; Chris Klein; Thomas Ian Nicholas; Tara Reid; Seann William Scott; Mena Suvari; Eddie Kaye Thomas; Jennifer Coolidge; Eugene Levy
- Cinematography: Daryn Okada
- Edited by: Jeff Betancourt
- Music by: Lyle Workman
- Production companies: Relativity Media; Practical Pictures; Zide/Perry Productions
- Distributed by: Universal Pictures
- Release date: April 6, 2012 (United States)
- Running time: 113 minutes
- Country: United States
- Language: English
- Budget: $50 million
- Box office: $235 million

American Reunion (also known as American Pie 4: Reunion or American Pie: Reunion in certain countries) is a 2012 American sex comedy film written and directed by Jon Hurwitz and Hayden Schlossberg. It is the fourth and final installment in the American Pie theatrical series. The film's ensemble cast features many actors who reprise their roles from the previous three films, including Jason Biggs, Alyson Hannigan, Chris Klein, Thomas Ian Nicholas, Seann William Scott, Eddie Kaye Thomas, Eugene Levy, Tara Reid, and Mena Suvari, among others. The film follows former East Great Falls High School classmates who return to their hometown for a reunion of their graduating class.

Released in the United States on April 6, 2012 by Universal Pictures, American Reunion received generally mixed reviews from critics and was a worldwide box office success, grossing $235 million against a $50 million budget.

== Plot ==
Nine years after getting married, (Note: As depicted in American Wedding (2003)) Jim Levenstein and his wife Michelle are in a sexual rut following the birth of their infant son. Kevin Myers is a househusband and architect, Chris "Oz" Ostreicher is a celebrity sportscaster dating superficial supermodel Mia, and Paul Finch has been traveling the world. The four friends return from their disparate locations to East Great Falls, Michigan, for their thirteen year high school reunion, and are joined by Steven Stifler, their obnoxious friend whom they hoped to avoid.

The group spends the next day at the lake with Michelle and her old Band Camp friend Selena, whom Finch bonds with over his travels. Kevin and Oz reunite with their high school girlfriends Vicky and Heather, and meet Heather's boyfriend Ron. The young thug AJ steals bikini tops from Mia and other women before fleeing on a jetski. Seeking revenge, the boys trace him and his friends to a beach where Jim overhears his plans to take the virginity of Kara—Jim's neighbor whom he used to babysit—now she has turned 18. Stifler destroys their jetskis as they are fleeing.

Instead of spending time with Michelle, Jim accompanies the others to the Falls, where they reminisce about high school and come across teens partying for Kara's birthday. Unsatisfied with Heather, Ron suggests swapping girlfriends for sex to a disgusted Oz. Kara drunkenly tries to seduce Jim, but he reluctantly rejects her. She passes out and Jim recruits Stifler, Finch, and Oz to distract her parents while he sneaks her into their house, worried Michelle will think he cheated on her. Jim returns home and falls asleep without having sex with Michelle, leaving her despondent about their failing marriage. The following morning, Kevin wakes up in bed with Vicky and assumes they had drunken sex. She confirms they did not but is upset he thinks so lowly of her.

Jim encourages his widower dad Noah to begin dating, so takes him to Stifler's house party where he meets Stifler's mother Jeanine. After Oz is deliberately embarrassed by Ron, he admits he misses Heather and kisses her. Mia finds out and breaks up with him, confessing to her own affair. Jim waits upstairs for Michelle so they can have sex, but Kara again tries to seduce him before AJ intervenes, and a fight ensues. Jim explains the situation to Michelle and states he does not care about Kara, causing both women to leave upset. The police arrive and arrest Finch for stealing a motorbike. Stifler mocks Finch's predicament, and the boys confront him over being a bad friend and his inability to move on from high school. Stifler counters that they have ignored and avoided him for years.

The next day, Noah offers Jim advice on repairing his marriage. At the reunion, Finch admits that he lied about his travels because he was embarrassed to admit that he had a normal job as a retail manager. He also reveals that he stole the bike from his boss after being denied a promised raise. Feeling guilty about their treatment of Stifler, the boys visit him at work and apologize, recognizing his unhappiness with his life and admitting that none of their lives are perfect, but that Stifler is their friend. Stifler confronts his verbally abusive boss and quits.

The group returns to the reunion together. Kevin reconciles with Vicky and introduces her to his wife, Finch makes amends for lying to Selena, and Oz and Heather choose to be together. Stifler is offered work as a wedding planner, and also meets and has sex with Finch's mother Rachel. Jim makes up with Michelle and they have sex in the school's music room.

The boys meet up the following day: Oz reveals he is staying in town with Heather; Finch intends to tour Europe with Selena; and Jim apologizes to Kara, who plans to save her virginity for a good man like him. Kevin proposes a pact for the group to meet up every year from now on.

== Cast ==
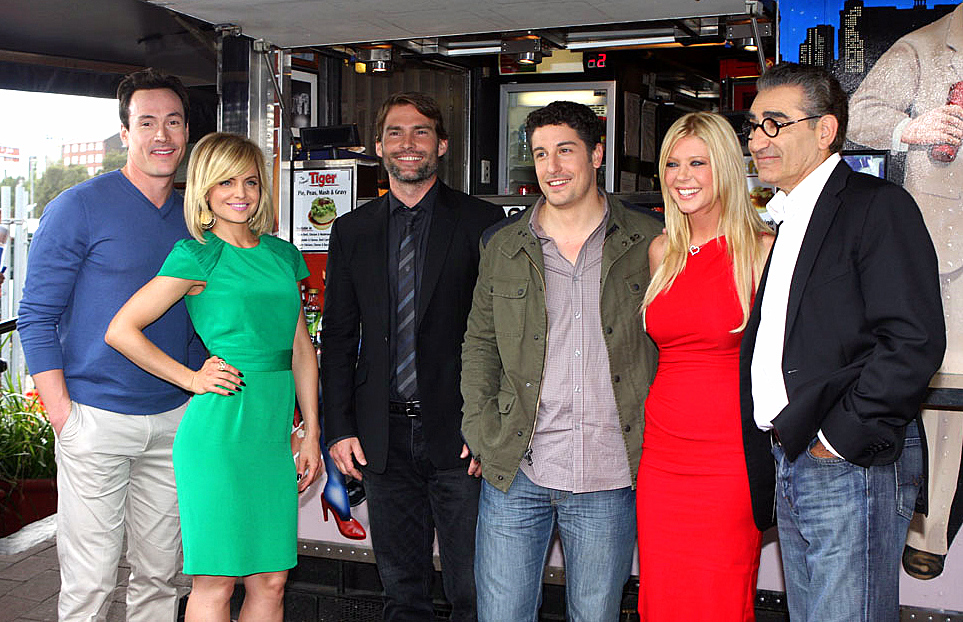
The film's cast, at Harry's Cafe de Wheels in Sydney 2012.

- Jason Biggs as Jim Levenstein, an office worker and Michelle's husband who experiences marital difficulties during the weekend
- Alyson Hannigan as Michelle Flaherty, Jim's wife who tries to have sex with Jim to rekindle their marriage
- Chris Klein as Chris "Oz" Ostreicher, a famous television personality who is unhappy with his glamorous lifestyle
- Thomas Ian Nicholas as Kevin Myers, a stay-at-home architect who gets the group together
- Seann William Scott as Steven "Steve" Stifler, a finance firm temp who is frowned upon by the others
- Eddie Kaye Thomas as Paul Finch, an intellectual who claims to have an adventurous lifestyle
- Eugene Levy as Noah Levenstein, Jim's father who is still broken up over his wife's death
- Tara Reid as Vicky Lathum, who lives in New York and hangs out with the group before the reunion
- Mena Suvari as Heather Gardner, Oz's ex-girlfriend who is now dating Ron
- John Cho as MILF Guy #2, who is organizing the reunion and has lost contact with his other "MILF" friend
- Jennifer Coolidge as Jeanine Stifler, Stifler's mom who is looking for new romance
- Natasha Lyonne as Jessica
- Dania Ramirez as Selena, a bartender who has changed drastically from her high school days
- Katrina Bowden as Mia, Oz's famous model girlfriend who has partying tendencies
- Jay Harrington as Dr. Ron, Heather's boyfriend
- Ali Cobrin as Kara, an 18-year-old girl who Jim used to babysit
- Chuck Hittinger as AJ, Kara's boyfriend
- Shannon Elizabeth as Nadia
- Chris Owen as Sherman
- Justin Isfeld as MILF Guy #1
- Charlene Amoia as Ellie, Kevin's wife
- Vik Sahay as Prateek Duraiswamy, Stifler's boss
- Molly Cheek as Jim's Mom
- Rebecca Field as Loni
- Neil Patrick Harris as Celebrity Dance-Off Host
- Chad Ochocinco as himself
- Rebecca De Mornay (uncredited) as Rachel Finch, Finch's mother

== Production ==
=== Development ===
In October 2008, Universal Pictures announced it was planning to produce a third theatrically released sequel to the first film. In April 2010, the film entered pre-production, with Jon Hurwitz and Hayden Schlossberg signing on to write and direct with plans to reunite the whole cast of the primary series.

=== Casting ===
In March 2011, it was announced that Jason Biggs, Seann William Scott and Eugene Levy had signed on to reprise their roles. Biggs and Scott were granted executive producer credits and also helped convince the other previous cast members to return. In April 2011, Alyson Hannigan, Chris Klein, and Mena Suvari signed on. The following month, Thomas Ian Nicholas, Tara Reid, Eddie Kaye Thomas, Shannon Elizabeth, and Jennifer Coolidge signed on. In June and July 2011, John Cho and Natasha Lyonne were the last returning cast to sign on.

On May 18, 2011, a casting call went out for the character "Kara", a role that involved "upper frontal nudity". Ali Cobrin was cast in the role. National Football League wide receiver Chad Ochocinco and actor Neil Patrick Harris have cameo roles.

Jason Biggs and Seann William Scott each received a reported $5 million plus a percentage of the profits for their performances. Alyson Hannigan and Eugene Levy were said to have been paid $3 million each, with the rest of the cast receiving payments within the $500,000 to $700,000 range, except Tara Reid, who was paid $250,000.

=== Filming ===
Principal photography for the $50 million movie took place from early June to August 2011 in metro Atlanta, Georgia. In late June, filming took place at Conyers, Monroe and Woodruff Park. While in Conyers, filming took place at Heritage High School's football stadium and band room. Production filmed at Newton High School in Covington from July 11 to July 15. Scenes were filmed at the school's gym for a reunion prom set, football field, commons area and hallways; which included 200 extras. Under the deal the production company paid $10,000 to the Newton County School System for using the school.

During the last week of July, production moved to Cumming to film at Mary Alice Park on Lake Lanier and included about 100 extras. Moore said the beach at the lake looks similar to a Lake Michigan setting, which is the state in which the film is set. The production company paid $23,000 to have full access to the property for a week. Suvari finished filming her scenes on August 4.

== Soundtrack ==
Professional ratings
Review scores
Source	Rating
AllMusic	2.5/5 stars

No.	Title	Performed by	Length
1.	"Last Night"	Good Charlotte	3:40
2.	"You Make Me Feel..." (featuring Sabi)	Cobra Starship	3:35
3.	"Here Comes the Hotstepper"	Stooshe	3:36
4.	"Wannamama"	Pop Levi	3:28
5.	"My First Kiss" (featuring Kesha)	3OH!3	3:13
6.	"I'm a Man"	The Blue Van	3:49
7.	"Bring It On Home"	Kopek	3:08
8.	"Rump Shaker" (featuring Teddy Riley)	Wreckx-N-Effect	3:57
9.	"Wannabe" (radio edit)	Spice Girls	2:53
10.	"I'll Make Love to You"	Boyz II Men	4:02
11.	"This Is How We Do It"	Montell Jordan	3:59
12.	"The Good Life"	Hassahn Phenomenon	3:21
13.	"My Generation"	Thomas Nicholas Band	2:28
14.	"Class of '99"	Lyle Workman	5:49
15.	"Na Na Na"	My Chemical Romance	4:13
16.	"American Reunion"	Lyle Workman	3:26
17.	"Laid"	James	2:37
18.	"London Town"	Greg Hatwell	2:54
19.	"Almost"	Attention	3:39

The two score tracks were recorded by a 60-70 piece orchestra conducted by John Ashton Thomas who also orchestrated Workman's score for the orchestral sessions. The orchestra was recorded at the Eastwood Scoring Stage at the Warner Bros. lot by Shawn Murphy who also mixed the score.

== Release ==
American Reunion was released in North American theaters on April 6, 2012.

The DVD and Blu-ray discs were released on July 10, 2012 in North America. The film was also released in a box set titled the "American Pie Quadrilogy" on August 22, 2012, in Australia. The theatrical version was available on iTunes a few days ahead of time, as an "Early Digital Release". It was released on September 10, 2012, in the United Kingdom.

== Reception ==
=== Box office ===
American Reunion opened in North America on April 6, 2012, in 3,192 theaters for a weekend total of $21,514,080, putting it at number 2 at the box office behind The Hunger Games. On its second week of release, it dropped to number 5 at the box office with a weekend total of $10,473,810.

The film earned $56,758,835 in North America and $177,978,063 internationally, for a worldwide total of $234,736,898.

=== Critical response ===
On Rotten Tomatoes, the film holds an approval rating of 45% based on 183 reviews, with an average rating of 5.3/10. The site's critical consensus reads, "It'll provide sweetly nostalgic comfort food for fans of the franchise, but American Reunion fails to do anything truly new or interesting – or even very funny – with the characters." On Metacritic, the film has a weighted average score of 49 out of 100, based on 34 critics, indicating "mixed or average" reviews. Audiences polled by CinemaScore gave the film an average grade of "B+" on an A+ to F scale.

According to Roger Ebert, who gave the film three out of four stars:

The charm of American Pie was the relative youth and naïveté of the characters. It was all happening for the first time, and they had the single-minded obsession with sex typical of many teenagers. American Reunion has a sense of déjà-vu, but it still delivers a lot of nice laughs. Most of them for me came thanks to Stifler... If you liked the earlier films, I suppose you gotta see this one. Otherwise, I dunno.

The Village Voice concludes its review with the following:

After some strained "Remember the time..." callbacks to 13-year-old gags, American Reunion gets comfortable and funny, as Hurwitz and Schlossberg hit familiar marks from unexpected angles, while the ensemble interplay is "routine" in the best sense of the word. Taken altogether, the Pie movies offer a cohesive worldview, showing each of life's stages as the setting for fresh-yet-familiar catastrophes, relieved by a belief in sex, however ridiculous it might look, as a restorative force. The recipe is so durable and the sustained character work so second-skin by now, one can imagine the Pie films keeping with the dramatis personae through middle age and into the problems of geriatric love, a raunch-comic version of Britain's documentary Up series. American Midlife Crisis? American Retirement? American Funeral? Let's go!

Peter Travers of Rolling Stone gave American Reunion a positive review of two and half stars out of four saying, "American Reunion reminds us what we liked about the original: the way the movie sweetened its raunch to build a rooting interest in these characters."

=== Accolades ===
Year	Award	Category	Recipients	Result
2012	Teen Choice Awards	Choice Movie – Comedy	Universal Pictures	Nominated
2012	Teen Choice Awards	Choice Movie Actor – Comedy	Jason Biggs	Nominated
2012	Teen Choice Awards	Choice Movie Actress – Comedy	Alyson Hannigan	Nominated
2013	BMI Film & TV Awards	Film Music	Lyle Workman	Won
2013	Guild of Music Supervisors Awards	Best Music Supervision for Film Budgeted Over 25 Million Dollars	Jojo Villanueva	Nominated

== Future ==
In August 2017, Seann William Scott said in an interview that the fourth film probably had not made enough at the domestic box office to warrant another film. In September 2022, it was announced that Universal 1440 was developing another spin off American Pie Presents movie with Sujata Day.
