= I'm Not Ashamed =

- Theatrical release poster
- Directed by: Brian Baugh
- Screenplay by: Bodie Thoene; Robin Hanley; Philipa Booyens; Kari Redmond
- Based on: Journals by Rachel Joy Scott
- Produced by: Brad Allen; Nise Davies; Chuck Howard; Martin Michael
- Starring: Masey McLain; Ben Davies; Sadie Robertson; David Errigo Jr.; Mark Daugherty; Cory Chapman; Taylor Kalupa; Korie Robertson; Ben VanderMey; Bella Robertson; Jennifer O'Neill; Cameron McKendry
- Cinematography: John Matysiak
- Edited by: Chris Witt
- Music by: Timothy Williams
- Distributed by: Pure Flix Entertainment
- Release date: October 21, 2016
- Running time: 112 minutes
- Country: United States
- Language: English
- Budget: $1.5 million
- Box office: $2.1 million

I'm Not Ashamed is a 2016 American biographical drama film directed by Brian Baugh and based on the journals of Rachel Scott, the first victim of the 1999 Columbine High School massacre in Columbine, Colorado. Scott, played by Masey McLain, serves as the protagonist of the film; the story of both gunmen, Eric Harris and Dylan Klebold, is intertwined with hers. The film was distributed by Pure Flix Entertainment. It received generally negative reviews from critics and audiences. It performed poorly at the box office as well, with revenue of $2.1 million compared to the $1.5 million budget of the film.

== Plot ==
In Littleton, Colorado, a young Rachel Joy Scott witnesses her father leave her family in the middle of the night. Her mother then struggles financially and encourages her children to pray for financial help. Rachel begins to embrace the Christian faith.

By 1998, Rachel is a sophomore at Columbine High School; she becomes rebellious and begins sneaking out to hang out with her friends, Madison, Gabby, and Celine. During the summer, Rachel's mother sends her to her cousins in Louisiana, where her journey with Christianity grows. By around the first day of her junior year, Rachel witnesses the jocks picking on Eric Harris and Dylan Klebold. Eric then threatens to harm them.

Later that year, Rachel begins to get involved with the head of the drama club, Alex Dickerson, and during a rehearsal, the two kiss. Later on, at a breakthrough meeting, Rachel meets Nathan Ballard, a homeless youth whose mother is a heroin addict. With Rachel's help, Nathan is able to be put up at another kid's house. Nathan is grateful.

One day, Rachel's stepfather, Larry, finds a beer bottle from a party in the car, and Rachel loses her right to the car, becoming rebellious again. At the first performance of the school play, Nathan arrives and begins to fight with Alex, embarrassing Rachel. At a party that night, Rachel discovers Alex cheating on her with Madison. She then begins to be bullied more often by others and even considers suicide at one point. However, with Nathan's encouragement, Rachel turns back to her faith and inspires other Christian students to not give up hope, despite being bullied. Meanwhile, Eric and Dylan plan their revenge on the school.

Meanwhile, Rachel tries to help Celine with family issues but is rebuffed. The day before prom, Celine reconciles with Rachel, revealing that she has issues with her mother. Not long after at prom, Alex tries to reconcile with Rachel, but she declines his apology.

On April 20, 1999, Rachel reconciles with Madison, and the two make plans to hang out the next day. At lunch, Rachel has an emotional conversation with a fellow student, Dave Rogers, about family issues. Rachel calms him by saying that everything happens for a reason. Just then, Eric and Dylan come out of the parking lot and begin shooting at Rachel and Richard Costaldo. Richard is knocked unconscious, while Rachel struggles to get away. Eric and Dylan corner her, with Eric tauntingly asking her if she still believes in God, and when Rachel tells him that she does, he points his gun to her head and shoots her. The assailants then storm the school offscreen, killing 11 other students and one teacher before taking their own lives. In the aftermath, U.S. President Bill Clinton (via archive footage) says that citizens must do more to reach out to our children teach them to express anger and resolve their conflicts with words, not weapons before addressing the nation that the prayers of the American people are with Littleton.

All of Rachel's friends pay tribute to her after the shooting. At Rachel's funeral, Nathan gives a eulogy, stating that he always loved her.

Sometime after, Rachel's mother finds a note on a dresser in their house, that Rachel had written years before. The note states that she will one day "touch millions of people's hearts".

== Cast ==
- Masey McLain as Rachel Joy Scott
  - Nola Fulk as Young Rachel
- Ben Davies as Nathan Ballard (Note: Based on Mark Bodiford-Pettit.)
- Emma Elle Roberts as Celine
- David Errigo Jr. and Cory Chapman as Eric Harris and Dylan Klebold
- Jennifer O'Neill as Linda Brown
- Justin Cone as Sean
- Sadie Robertson as Charity
- Korie Robertson as Aunt Bea
- Jaci Velasquez as Mrs. Diaz
- Victoria Staley as Madison
- Taylor Kalupa as Gabby
- Matthew Schuler as K.J.
- Terri Minton as Beth Nimmo
- Derick Von Tagen as Craig Scott
- Anna Grace Stewart as Dana Scott
- Cameron McKendry as Alex Dickerson
- Nancy Stafford as Mrs. Talbot
- Abigail Duhon as Chloe
- Ashlyn Moore as Bethanee Scott

== Production ==
The film was based on the book The Journals of Rachel Scott, by Debra Klingsporn, and Beth Nimmo, mother of Rachel Scott, who was one of the executive producers of the film. Benny Proffitt, Christian author, speaker and co-founder of Christian youth group, First Priority, oversaw the creation of the film and helped to ensure the integrity of the story throughout the film's production.

== Historical accuracy and controversies ==
The actual circumstances surrounding Rachel Scott's final moments are a subject of dispute.

No police or FBI reports, nor any eyewitness reports, mentions the killers having said anything to Rachel before her death. Police and FBI investigations as well as abundant amount of evidence shows that Scott was shot from afar without any conversation taking place.

The movie further shows Richard Castaldo, the student shot directly alongside Rachel and who only survived the attack by feigning death, later recalled hearing Rachel weeping as she curled into a ball upon the grass, before hearing a final gunshot as Harris and Klebold approached them. This coincides with how Castaldo described the events.

The film was also criticized for suggesting that Klebold and Harris were influenced in their actions because the school taught evolution instead of creation.

== Release ==
In October 2015, an official trailer for the film that was uploaded to YouTube by Pure Flix was removed, and the Pure Flix channel suspended. As a result, the producers of the film accused YouTube of an anti-Christian bias, and claimed that they were not "provided with any clear explanation or substantiation" of why the trailer was removed, though they speculated that it may have been because of a Change.org petition saying it glorified the shooting. YouTube stated that the trailer was flagged by the community, and noted that due to the volume of reports they receive, the website sometimes makes the wrong call when such mass-flaggings occur.

The film has since been released on DVD, including a German version in 2017 and a French version in 2020.

== Reception ==
=== Box office ===
The film opened in 505 theaters on October 21, 2016, and played at 516 theaters in its widest release. Its lifetime box-office take was $2,082,980.

=== Critical reception ===
The film was panned by critics. On review aggregator website Rotten Tomatoes, the film has an approval rating of 22% based on 9 reviews, with an average rating of 4.15/10. On Metacritic, the film received a score of 31 out of 100, based on 6 reviews, indicating "generally unfavorable" reviews.

Jordan Hoffman of The Guardian gave the film a rating of two out of five stars, writing: "To use the senseless death of a school shooting victim to promote one's warped political agenda is, to use a trendy term, deplorable", although he praised McLain's portrayal of Rachel Scott, saying she was the film's "saving grace" and "a terrific, warm and engaging performer". Vadim Rizov of The A.V. Club gave the film a grade of "D+", calling it "just another vehicle for a series of scenes in which devout characters remind each other that God has it all under control" and that "the political implications are very unsavory". Noel Murray of the Los Angeles Times noted that, while the film placed "a welcome emphasis on accepting people for who they are, [...] the forced ironies of having infamous teen mass-murderers interact with the heroine feels more than a little exploitative." However, Luke Thompson of Forbes had a more positive reaction, summarizing the film as "a sweet little high-school movie about wanting to be liked, wanting to be good, and the conflict those two desires sometimes bring."

== See also ==
- Cassie Bernall
- A Mother's Reckoning
- Columbine (book)
- Rachel's Tears (book)
