= The Shrine (film) =

- Theatrical release poster
- Directed by: Jon Knautz
- Screenplay by: Jon Knautz; Brendan Moore
- Story by: Jon Knautz; Brendan Moore; Trevor Matthews
- Produced by: J. Michael Dawson
- Starring: Aaron Ashmore; Cindy Sampson; Trevor Matthews
- Cinematography: James Griffith
- Edited by: Matthew Brulotte
- Music by: Ryan Shore
- Production company: Brookstreet Pictures
- Distributed by: Brookstreet Pictures
- Release date: 25 July 2010 (Fantasia Festival)
- Running time: 93 minutes
- Country: Canada
- Languages: English; Polish
- Budget: $1.5 million

The Shrine is a 2010 Canadian supernatural horror film produced by Brookstreet Pictures. The film was directed by Jon Knautz and stars Aaron Ashmore, Cindy Sampson, Meghan Heffern, and Trevor Matthews. The screenplay was written by Jon Knautz, Brendan Moore, and Trevor Matthews. Ryan Shore received a 2012 Grammy Award nomination for Best Score Soundtrack for his score.

== Plot ==
The film starts with a man tied to a table. Another man then kills him with a sledgehammer to the face.

Journalist Carmen and her photographer boyfriend Marcus are having relationship problems since Carmen tends to ignore him in favor of her job. Carmen asks her boss, Dale, to allow her to investigate the disappearances of tourists in the (fictional) Polish village of Alvainia, including Eric Taylor (who was killed at the beginning of the film). Dale is not interested in the case, and does not give her permission to go. Undeterred, Carmen and her intern Sara visit Eric's mother, Laura, who allows her to borrow Eric's journal. Carmen has a dream of Eric, who tells her to leave him alone. Wanting to mend her relationship with Marcus, Carmen urges him to come with her and Sara to Alvainia.

Upon arrival, they find the village people to be secretive and unwelcoming. They question a girl, Lidia, about Eric but she is hesitant to answer. They discover that no one in the village is allowed to leave and spot a strange area of fog that seems to be concentrated only in one portion of the forest, mentioned in Eric's notes. When they attempt to investigate it, they are threatened by the villagers and told to leave. Though Marcus wants to leave, Carmen admits that Dale knows nothing about the trip and her career will be over if she returns with no story. Thus, they head back into the forest.

The group notes how strange it is that the fog seems to never move and is quite dense. Sara enters the fog and disappears. Carmen enters the fog to look for her but also finds herself lost. Marcus finds a scared and dazed Sara walking out. Within the fog, Carmen comes across a statue of a demon holding a heart. After taking a frontal photo, she repositions to take a side profile shot. Upon doing so, she see that the statue's head is now turned towards her, its eyes bleeding and strange whispering voices are heard. Frightened, Carmen exits the fog and is reunited with Marcus and Sara. As they discuss this occurrence, Sara mentions having seen a statue in the fogged area.

As they make their way back to the car, they come across Lidia, who claims to know the whereabouts of Eric. She takes them to a hidden sacrificial shrine where they discover the bodies of several people (including Eric) that the villagers have executed. Each body has a metal mask stuck on its face, suggesting cultist behavior and ritual black magic. The trio then realizes that they have been barred in. They escape but are pursued by the villagers. They hide in a barn but are all captured. Before Sara is knocked out, she sees one of the villagers turn into a demon.

As they wake up, Sara vomits and the villagers bring them back to the sacrificial shrine where the head of the village's church, Arkadiusz, decides to sacrifice Sara and Carmen. The two are taken inside while Marcus is forced at gunpoint to dig a grave. Marcus escapes and takes the villager's gun. At the shrine, the cultists dress the girls in ceremonial gowns. They place Sara on the ceremonial table where Eric was killed while Carmen is placed in a prison cell. The cultists lacerate Sara's arms and sever her Achilles' tendons. Sara sees the faces of the cultists and Arkadiusz turn into demons. The same mask found on the corpses is placed over her head. It has two spikes inside which are meant to pierce her eyes. Arkadiusz takes a sledgehammer and uses it to embed the mask into her face, killing her. Marcus rescues Carmen and escapes with her.

Carmen stops to vomit and begins hearing voices again. They enter a family's house to steal the keys to a truck. The family becomes visibly frightened upon seeing Carmen. Marcus asks for the keys to the truck but they cannot understand English. He ties up the couple while Carmen hallucinates the family and Marcus turning into demons. The couple's son gives Marcus the truck keys and warns him that Carmen is evil since "she has seen the statue".

Carmen becomes possessed by a demon and lets out a loud shriek. The cultists hear the shriek and are alerted to her location. Marcus finds the family brutally killed. The possessed Carmen then goes to kill him as well when she is confronted by Arkadiusz, Henryk and four villagers. She kills two of them, but Arkadiusz fights back with prayers and holy water. Carmen impales him; before Arkadiusz dies, he passes on his duties to Henryk. Henryk chants prayers and stabs Carmen. The prayers weaken her and the remaining cultists impale her hands and pin her to the floor. They position the mask over her face but her struggles prevent the mask from being placed over her eyes. Marcus now understands why it was necessary to kill Sara and Carmen. The cultists are not cultists, and were not sacrificing anyone; they were trying to prevent demonic possessions from taking place. He assists the group and Henryk embeds the mask onto Carmen, killing her.

One of the men asks Henryk what are they going to do with Marcus since he knows too much. In the end, Marcus is set free by the villagers. Henryk explains that the fog is a curse left long ago on the village that cannot be undone. The devilish statue is shown once more and the screen goes black.

=== Alternate ending ===
A montage plays with a voiceover from Henryk. Carmen's body is placed with the previous victims, a funeral is held for the villagers who have died, and the belongings of Marcus, Carmen and Sara are dumped. Marcus is made to stay in the village, being given the deceased family's house as his new home. Henryk explains that it not only serves to keep Marcus from revealing the village's secret to the world but also as penance since it was his freeing of Carmen that resulted in the deaths of several of the villagers. Marcus does not object, remarking that he would find it difficult to explain why he came back without Carmen and Sara.

== Cast ==
- Aaron Ashmore as Marcus
- Cindy Sampson as Carmen
- Meghan Heffern as Sara
- Trevor Matthews as Henryk
- Vieslav Krystyan as Arkadiusz
- Laura DeCarteret as Laura Taylor
- Ben Lewis as Eric Taylor
- Julia Debowska as Lidia
- Monica Bugajski as Emilia
- Stefen Hayes as Aleks
- Connor Stanhope as Dariusz
- Philip Craig as Dale
- Laura de Carteret as Laura Taylor

== Production ==
The Shrine was directed by Jon Knautz, who also co-wrote the film's script alongside Brendan Moore. Knautz had previously directed the 2007 comedy horror film Jack Brooks: Monster Slayer. On 2 August 2009, it was announced that Aaron Ashmore, who had previously starred in the television series Smallville had been cast in the film's lead male role. Cindy Sampson, Meghan Heffern, and Trevor Matthews were later cast in the film.

Principal photography for the film began on 10 August 2009, in Toronto.

The film's original score was composed by Ryan Shore. Shore's score received a Grammy Award nomination for Best Score Soundtrack at the 54th Annual Grammy Awards.

== Release ==
The Shrine premiered at the FanTasia Film Festival on 25 July 2010.

=== Home media ===
The film was released on DVD by Import Vendor on 7 June 2011. It was later released on Blu-ray by Ais on 3 April 2012. On 8 May that same year, it was released on DVD by Kim Stim.

== Reception ==
Bill Gibron from PopMatters gave the film 6/10 stars, writing, "Clearly, writer/director Jon Knautz hoped the investigative journalist set-up would tie everything together. Instead, thanks to a horribly unlikable lead, it pulls them apart. As a result, we are stuck grading the effectiveness of each bit, and when the final tally is examined, The Shrine doesn't survive."
