= OWS Media Group =

OWS Media Group, Inc. is a group of the Occupy Wall Street movement, which achieved media attention after filing a lawsuit to re-obtain control over the Twitter account, @OccupyWallStNYC, which was hijacked by one of tweetboat's former members and password holders, Justin Wedes.
