= Kim Planert =

- Born: Bad Harzburg, Germany
- Occupation: Composer
- Website: kimplanert.com

Kim Planert is a German film and television composer based in Los Angeles. He has composed music for over 230 episodes of prime-time television shows and feature films. His collection of TV credits include: eight seasons on the score for ABC's television show, Castle, Timeless (NBC), Missing (ABC), The Whispers (ABC series produced by Steven Spielberg), The McKenna Files (Mark Gordon, ABC Pilot), The Unit (CBS), Lie To Me (FOX), The Gates (ABC), The Chicago Code (FOX), Last Resort (ABC) and Rush (USA Network)

His film credits include I Into The Blue 2: The Reef. A Reason and Chasing Grace. Feature documentary film credits include Skid Row Marathon, and The Game: Gambling Between Life and Death, which had its theatrical premiere at the Hof International Film Festival in 2021, followed by the television premiere on the Bayerischer Rundfunk. Planert has also written music for video games such as Final Fantasy’s Agni's Philosophy E3 Trailer and the spatial audio score for Oculus’ virtual reality (VR) game DAVID. In 2022, Studio Babelsberg launched their new image trailer for which Planert contributed the music. The film and music can also be seen and heard in an exhibition in one of Germany's major film museums, the Potsdam Film Museum.

Besides scoring, Planert has released two solo albums thus far. His first solo album Skylight: Notes from a Logbook takes inspiration from his passion for flying as a former Wingsuit Skydiver, and the recovery from a life-altering accident. In 2022, Planert released his second solo project: neoclassical album Being. Stand-alone singles include Lux Ex Tenebris and Dawn. The corresponding music video of Dawn supported the inclusion campaign Ability in Progress. The music video of Lux Ex Tenebris screened at Oscar qualifying festivals CineQuest, BronzeLens, and the Dawn won ‘Best Music Video’ at the Oxford International Film Festival as well as ‘Director’s Choice Award’ at the 41st Thomas Edison Film Festival.

== Biography ==
At the age of 19, Planert made four tours to former Yugoslavia during the Bosnian War to provide humanitarian aid. One of Planert's first songs made it through the frontline into the "Pocket of Bihać" and was played on radio Bihać. He wrote the song for the people of the city, who were at the time surrounded by Serbian forces.

Before moving to Los Angeles, Planert resided in the UK where he collaborated with music producers and musicians including Craig Armstrong, Capercaillie, Secret Garden, John McLaughlin (FIVE), Dave James (Take That), Gordon Goudie (Simple Minds), Karen Matheson, Phil Cunningham, James Grant, Karen Casey, Michael McGoldrick, The Dhol Foundation, Phamie Gow, BBC Scottish Symphony Orchestra, and the Scottish Ensemble.

He worked as a sound engineer and producer for over a decade and recorded and mixed more than 40 albums as well as soundtracks for several films including American Cousins, The Bone Collector, One Last Chance and the TV show Crowdie + Cream - which won a BAFTA award for "Best Soundtrack" and "Best Theme".

After moving to Los Angeles, Planert started to collaborate with Robert Duncan on numerous shows between 2008 and 2016. Scoring prime time TV shows and movies, Planert gained profound film and television industry experience in Duncan's mentorship.

Planert and Duncan won "Best Score in a TV Show" at the Hollywood Music In Media Awards for Missing (ABC), in addition Skid Row Marathon was awarded with the Crystal Pine Award for "Best Original Score Documentary" at the International Sound & Film Music Festival in 2019. In the same year Planert's music piece B.S.B.D. from his first solo album Skylight was nominated for the Jerry Goldsmith Award.

Planert is a former skydiver with 402 jumps totaling over 17 hours of free fall time. His wingsuit jumps include competing in the US National Championships and flying over Panama, Hawaii and Burning Man. His passion for wingsuiting as well as his accident are the foundation of his first solo album Skylight.

Planert scored the project Skid Row Marathon, a feature-length documentary following the story of a Los Angeles judge who starts a running club on Skid Row to give its members a second chance at life as they battle their addictions. Planert invited a former addict and homeless musician (one of the subjects of the documentary) to work on the score with him and also conduct a cue at the final scoring session. They still frequently collaborate.

As a producer, Planert joined the teams on Skid Row Marathon, A Reason and Chasing Grace in bringing the projects to life. He also has his own productions in development including a TV series based on his brother's humanitarian aid work during the Bosnian war.

With The Game: Gambling between Life and Death, Planert returned to the plight of the refugees beaten back, tortured and starved at the European border. The score features the Budapest Scoring Orchestra, Duduk performed by Chris Bleth (The Mandalorian, Star Trek), and the voice of Iranian Singer Azam Ali (Niyaz, 300, Matrix).

== Discography ==
=== Television series ===
Year	Title	Director	Studio
2016	Timeless		Sony Pictures
2010 - 2016	Castle		ABC
2015	Mad Dogs		Amazon Studios
2015	The Whispers		ABC
2014	Agatha		ABC
2014	Rush		Fox 21
2012	Missing		ABC
2012	Last Resort		Sony Pictures Television
2011	Lie to Me		20th Century Fox
2011	The Chicago Code		20th Century Fox
2010	The Gates		Fox Television
2009 - 2010	Lie to Me		Fox
2008 - 2009	The Unit		CBS

=== Film ===
Year	Title	Director	Studio - Production company
2021	The Game: Gambling Between Life and Death	Manuela Federl	Doppelkopf Studio
2017	Skidrow Marathon	Mark Hayes	OWLS Media
2016	Chasing Light	Jessica Pilkes	Corviva Films
2015	Chasing Grace	David Temple	Catalyst Pictures
2014	A Reason	Dominique Schilling	Risberg Schilling Productions
2012	Girl vs Monster	Stuart Gillard	Disney Channel, Bad
2009	Into the Blue 2: The Reef	Stephen Herek	MGM, Mandaly Pictures
2009	The Last Passport	Kent Smith and David Temple	Lucky You Films
2007	Nest of Spiders	Jessika Pilkes	Corviva Films

=== Advertising, trailers and corporate video ===
Year	Title	Company	Type
2022	Enter Metropolis	Studio Babelsberg	Image Trailer
2014	Snap Sound Sizzle Reel	Snap Sound	Trailer
2007	Athletes In Action	The Film Factory	Documentary
2007	2XSalt	The Film Factory	Documentary
2007	Wix Filters	Emulsion Arts	Corporate video
2007	North Carolina School Of The Arts	NCSA	Promotional video

=== Video games ===
Year	Title	Company	Type
2022	DAVID	Two Guys Productions	Facebook Oculus VR Game
2012	Agni's Philosophy Final Fantasy	Square Enix	Trailer

=== Awards ===
Year	Soundtrack - Song - Album	Festival - Awards	Award wins and nominations
2021	Dawn (Music Video)	Oxford International Film Festival	Winner - Best Music Video
2019	B.S.B.D. (From Skylight)	Jerry Goldsmith Award	Nominated - Jerry Goldsmith Award
2019	Skid Row Marathon	International Sound & Film Music Festival	Winner - Best Original Score Documentary
2014	A Reason	Global Music Awards	Winner - Best Original Score
2013	A Reason	Hollywood Music In Media Awards	Nominated - Best Score in Indie Feature
2012	Missing	Hollywood Music In Media Awards	Winner - Best Score in a TV Show
2008	Nest of Spiders	Park City Film Music Festival	Winner - Best Use of Music in a Short Film
2002	Crowdie and Cream	BAFTA	Winner - Best Soundtrack

=== Producer ===
Year	Title	Director	Studio - Production company
2017	Skidrow Marathon	Mark Hayes	OWLS Media
2015	Chasing Grace	David Temple	Catalyst Pictures
2014	A Reason	Dominique Schilling	Risberg Schilling Productions

=== Sound engineer ===
Year	Title	Director - Artist	Studio - Label
2006	Szymanowski - Complete Piano Music	Sinea Lee	Devine Arts
2006	Tribute To Jinky	Laura McGhee	
2006	Moments In Time	Phamie Gow	Wildfire Records
2006	Downriver	Karen Matheson	Vertical Records
2006	Bookmarks	Roddy Hart	Vertical Records
2006	James Ross	James Ross	Greentrax
2005	Wired	Michael McGoldrick	Vertical Records
2005	Guitar Music From Scotland and Beyond	n/a	Greentrax
2005	Peter Seivewright		Divine Arts
2005		Royal Scottish Academy Brass	
2005	The Little Beauty	Ingrid Henderson	Our Laundry Productions
2005	Raining Up	Máiréad Nesbitt	Manhattan Records
2004	Holy Love	James Grant	Vertical Records
2004	Ballads At The Gates Of Dawn	Scottish International Piano Competition	CRC
2004	Gaels In War	n/a	Mac TV
2004	Drum Believable	Dhol Foundation	TDF
2003	Take Me Out Drinking Tonight	Annie Grace	Greentrax
2003	Choice Language	Capercaillie	Vertical Records
2003	Distant Shore	Karen Casey	Vertical Records
2003	Summer At My Feet	North Creeg	Greentrax Records
2003	What Road	Session A9	Raj Records
2003	Columba Sessions	n/a	Pelicula Films
2003	The Bards	n/a	Mac TV
2002	Time to Fall	Karen Matheson	Vertigo Records
2002	American Cousins	Don Coutts	Bard Entertainment
2002	One Last Chance	Sterwart Svaasand	Scott Three Ltd
2002	Crowdie And Cream	Bill Macleod	BBC
2002	Once in Red Moon	Secret Garden	Decca
2002	I Shot the Albatross	James Grant	Vertical Records
2002	Tasci	n/a	Eolas/BBC
2002	Anna Bheag	n/a	Mac TV / BBC
2002	Pray For Rain	Andrew White	Vertical Records
2002	Let Them Eat Fishcakes	Harem Scarem	Vertical Records
2002	Capercaillie Live In Concert	Capercaillie	Survival
2001	At First Light	Michael McGoldrick	Vertical Records
2001	Togaidh Sinn Fonn	n/a	MNE Television
2000	My Thrawn Glory	James Grant	Vertical Records
2000	Nusa	Rory Campbell and Malcom Sitt	Vertical Records
2000	Arredor	Manuel Bondino	Virgin
2000	Sorchar na Reul	n/a	MNE Television
2000	Nadura	Capercaillie	Survival
1999	The Bone Collector	Phillip Noyce	Columbia Pictures, Universal Pictures
1999	Demo	Skandal	
1999	Demo	911	Virgin
1999	Demo	Rosie Gains	
1999	Demo	Heavenly	
1999	Demo	Mero	RCA Records
1999	Demo	Adiva	
1999	Demo	Dave James	
