= Jack Brooks: Monster Slayer =

- Film poster
- Directed by: Jon Knautz
- Screenplay by: John Ainslie; Jon Knautz
- Story by: John Ainslie; Jon Knautz; Trevor Matthews; Patrick White
- Produced by: Trevor Matthews; Neil Bregman; Patrick White
- Starring: Trevor Matthews; Rachel Skarsten; Daniel Kash; James A. Woods; David Fox; Robert Englund
- Cinematography: Joshua Allen
- Edited by: Matthew Brulotte
- Music by: Ryan Shore
- Production companies: Brookstreet Pictures; Sound Venture Productions
- Distributed by: Kinosmith
- Release dates: October 9, 2007 (Sitges Film Festival); July 25, 2008 (Canada)
- Running time: 90 minutes
- Country: Canada
- Language: English
- Budget: CAD$2.5 million

Jack Brooks: Monster Slayer is a 2007 Canadian comedy horror film produced by Brookstreet Pictures. The film was directed by Jon Knautz and stars Trevor Matthews, Robert Englund and Rachel Skarsten. The film is about a plumber named Jack (Trevor Matthews) whose family gets slaughtered by a demonic beast. While fixing the pipes for Professor Crowley (Robert Englund), the Professor awakens an evil source and eventually transforms his body into a monster. With the evil spreading out of control, Jack harnesses his anger to face the monsters and avenge his family.

== Plot ==
The film begins with a monstrous cyclops assaulting a village in Africa, where a monster hunter is preparing to intervene, and a flashback to tell the story that leads up to this is told. As a child, Jack Brooks witnesses his sister, mother and father attacked and killed by a forest troll during a camping trip, with Jack forced to run and hide to avoid the same fate. This leaves now-adult Jack with an extremely short fuse and uncontrolled anger issues that frustrate his psychotherapist and alienates Jack's impatient and irritable girlfriend Eve with whom he attends night school taught by Professor Crowley. Jack is constantly late to class and only attends the end of a lesson where Crowley demonstrates a chemical reaction of Sodium metal in water, which causes a small explosion with just a tiny piece cut off of a larger block.

Working as a plumber, Jack is propositioned by Professor Crowley to help him clear an obstruction in the pipes of his newly purchased home, which fails to yield results and injures Jack, but also unearths something buried in the backyard of the house. Jack leaves to order a replacement part, while Professor Crowley becomes possessed by some unknown force and spends the night digging in the backyard with his bare hands. Upon awakening in the morning with no memory of the night's events, Crowley gives in to morbid curiosity and uses a shovel to dig up a large box found to contain human bones and what looks like an intact heart.

Jack encounters an old man, Howard, working at the hardware store while ordering the spare part, who warns him of the dangers of that old 'cursed' house, asking Jack to return the next day when the part will arrive and promising to reveal the story behind his cryptic warning. Meanwhile, Professor Crowley discovers the heart to still be beating, only to have it force its way into his mouth and down his throat. Awakening after the shock, he hungrily devours the meat in his refrigerator and shows up to class disheveled, dismissing the class after incoherently attempting to communicate, vomiting, and declaring himself to be starving. Returning home, he runs out of meat and instead kills and eats his pet dog.

Jack returns to the hardware store and Howard tells him the story of his childhood living in Crowley's house decades ago with his uncle Emmet, a collector of antiquities and how the heart had come into his possession, a trophy from a legendary battle against a real-life monster. Like Crowley, Emmet succumbed to its possession and consumed the heart, slowly turning him into a savage lunatic who, after eating his dog, bites off young Howard's hand and forcing the boy to shoot him in self-defense. Burying his uncle, but remarking that he could hear the heart still beating, he warns Jack that no good will come of going near the house. Jack, despite his own experience with monsters, ignores him and goes to class for the night.

After Jack flirts with another classmate, and becomes jealous of the attention another student is giving Eve, Jack and Eve are about to end their relationship just before class when Professor Crowley, more swollen and disheveled than ever, finally fully transforms into a monster, with tentacles bursting from his back and capturing almost every classmate of theirs, while Jack and Eve help an injured classmate out of the classroom and barricade themselves in a different one down the hall. Crowley, now monstrously enlarged and deformed, turns five of their classmates into troll-like monster thralls one by one over the whole movie. He does this by injecting them with a flood of black liquid via a proboscis-like tongue that emerges from his mouth, and dispatches them to hunt down the escapees, as his primary body is immobile.

Jack and Eve fail to save their injured classmate and a janitor when the monstrous minions, who are superhumanly strong, attack and eat the janitor and the injured classmate is dragged away. Using the monsters' feeding upon the victims as a distraction to escape the school, the two flee in Jack's van, but after the radio plays the song his parents had been dancing to on the fateful night of their deaths, Jack realizes he cannot run away again, having felt helpless as a child and not being able to forgive himself for being powerless to do anything to save his family, seeing this as his chance to do something about the monsters that have haunted him all his life. Kicking the uncooperative Eve out of the van, he returns to the school armed with his plumbing tools.

Taking out two of the monsters without injury, Jack is bitten by a third and attacked by the injured classmate who is now a monster but defeats them, collecting a fire axe from an emergency box on the wall along the way to confronting Crowley in the classroom, after defeating a final minion who had just been transformed. Unable to get close enough to attack due to Crowley's tentacles, Jack grabs the container with the entire block of Sodium metal from Crowley's lesson days before and throws it into Crowley's mouth, blowing Crowley's head off. Jack is ambushed by another tentacle, as despite being headless, monster Crowley's heart is still beating and the body is still alive. Jack finishes the monster off by hacking the heart with the fire axe, ending the threat once and for all.

Having saved the rest of the class and earning the affection of the classmate with whom he had flirted before, Jack has an epiphany and returns to the forest where he lost his family, killing the troll that took them from him, and making a new career out of slaying monsters, leading into the scene from the beginning where he faces down the cyclops in the African village.

== Cast ==
- Robert Englund as Professor Gordon Crowley
- Trevor Matthews as Jack Brooks and Forest Troll
  - Evan Gilchrist as Young Jack Brooks
- Rachel Skarsten as Eve
- David Fox as Old Howard
  - Austin MacDonald as Young Howard
- Daniel Kash as Counselor Silverstein
- James A. Woods as John
- Stefanie Drummond as Janice
- Dean Hawes as Emmet
- Ashley Bryant as Kristy
- Chad Harber as Pat
- Patrick Henry as Trevor
- Meghanne Kessels as Suzy
- Meg Charette as Erica
- Kristyn Butcher as Celia
- Andrew Butcher as Raymond
- Simon Rainville as Slim
- Matthew Stefiuk as Omar
- Ariel Waller as Cindy Brooks
- John Ross as Charles Brooks
- Victoria Fodor as Gene Brooks
- Derrick Damon Reeve as Cyclops

== Reception ==
Jack Brooks: Monster Slayer was received with mixed reviews from film critics on its original release. The film ranking website Rotten Tomatoes reported that 64% of critics had given the film positive reviews, based upon a sample of 25. The consensus states: "A sincere but excessive send-up of low rent horror hokum, Jack Brooks: Monster Slayer features some sharp laughs and features a scene-stealing performance by Robert Englund". At Metacritic, which assigns a rating out of 100 to reviews from mainstream critics, the film has received an average score of 46, based on 7 reviews.

== Soundtrack ==
The music was composed by Ryan Shore. He recorded the score with a 93 piece symphony orchestra which he conducted. Ain't It Cool News named Ryan Shore's score one of the "Top 10 Scores of the Year".

== Release ==
The film premiere was on October 9, 2007, at Sitges Film Festival and is part of the 2010 Festival de Cine de Terror de Molins de Rei Journal in Barcelona.
