= Gregory Poirier =

American film director

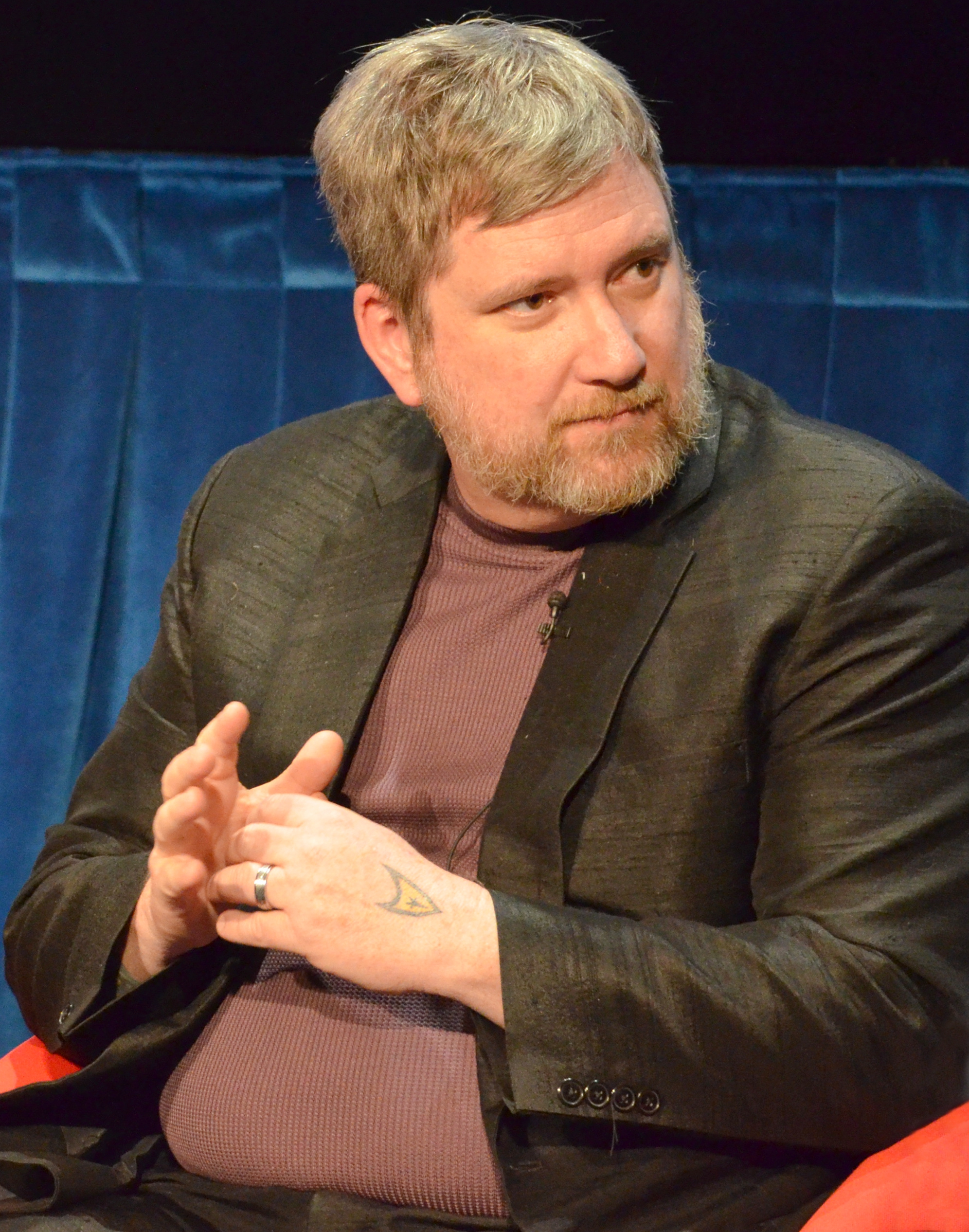
- Gregory Poirier in 2012
- Born: May 19, 1961 (age 63); Kula, Hawaii, U.S.
- Occupation(s): Writer, producer, director

Gregory Stephen Poirier (born May 19, 1961) is an American film and television writer, director, and producer.

== Life and career ==
Poirier was born in Kula, Maui, Hawaii, and attended the Maui Academy of Performing Arts. He wrote the screenplay for the John Singleton-directed film Rosewood (1997), for which he won the Writers Guild of America's Paul Selvin Award. He also wrote the screenplay for the comedy See Spot Run (2001) and wrote and directed the comedy Tomcats (2001).

Poirier's other writing credits include The Lion King II: Simba's Pride (1998), Gossip (2000), A Sound of Thunder (2005), National Treasure: Book of Secrets (2007), The Spy Next Door (2010) starring Jackie Chan, and Knox Goes Away (2023), directed by and starring Michael Keaton.

Poirier is creator, executive producer, and writer of the ABC mystery series Missing, starring Ashley Judd, which aired for one season in 2012.
