= Trevor Matthews =

Canadian film producer and actor

- Born: July 24, 1982 (age 44); Ottawa, Ontario, Canada
- Education: Carleton University; New York Film Academy
- Occupations: Founder and CEO, Brookstreet Pictures
- Years active: 2004–present
- Parent: Sir Terry Matthews

Trevor Matthews (born July 24, 1982) is a Welsh-Canadian film producer and actor. He is the youngest son of telecommunications billionaire Sir Terry Matthews.

== Early life ==
Matthews was born in Ottawa and grew up in Kanata, Ontario. He attended W. Erskine Johnston, Ashbury College, Earl of March Secondary School, Carleton University, and the New York Film Academy from which he graduated in filmmaking in 2002.

== Career ==
Matthews is the CEO and founder of Brookstreet Pictures. As an actor he has performed in Jack Brooks: Monster Slayer, The Shrine, Girl House, and several short films.

== Personal life ==
Matthews lives in Los Angeles, California.

== Filmography ==
Year	Title	Director	Producer	Writer	Role	Notes
2004	Teen Massacre	No	No	No	Pete	
2005	Still Life	No	No	No	Nathan Evens	Short film
2005	The Other Celia	No	Yes	No	—N/a	
2007	Moment of Truth	No	Yes	No	The Hunter	
2007	Jack Brooks: Monster Slayer	No	Yes	Yes	Jack Brooks, Forest Troll	story
2010	The Shrine	No	Yes	Yes	Henryk	executive producer
2010	Old West	No	Yes	Yes	Will	
2015	Girl House	Yes	Yes	No	—N/a	
2017	First Kill	No	Yes	No	—N/a	executive producer
2018	O.G.	No	Yes	No	—N/a	
2018	Skin	No	Yes	No	—N/a	executive producer
2020	Brothers by Blood	No	Yes	No	—N/a	
2021	The Forgiven	No	Yes	No	—N/a	
2024	The Brutalist	No	Yes	No	—N/a	

== See also ==
- List of Canadian producers
- List of Canadian actors
- List of people from Ottawa
