= American entry into Canada by land =

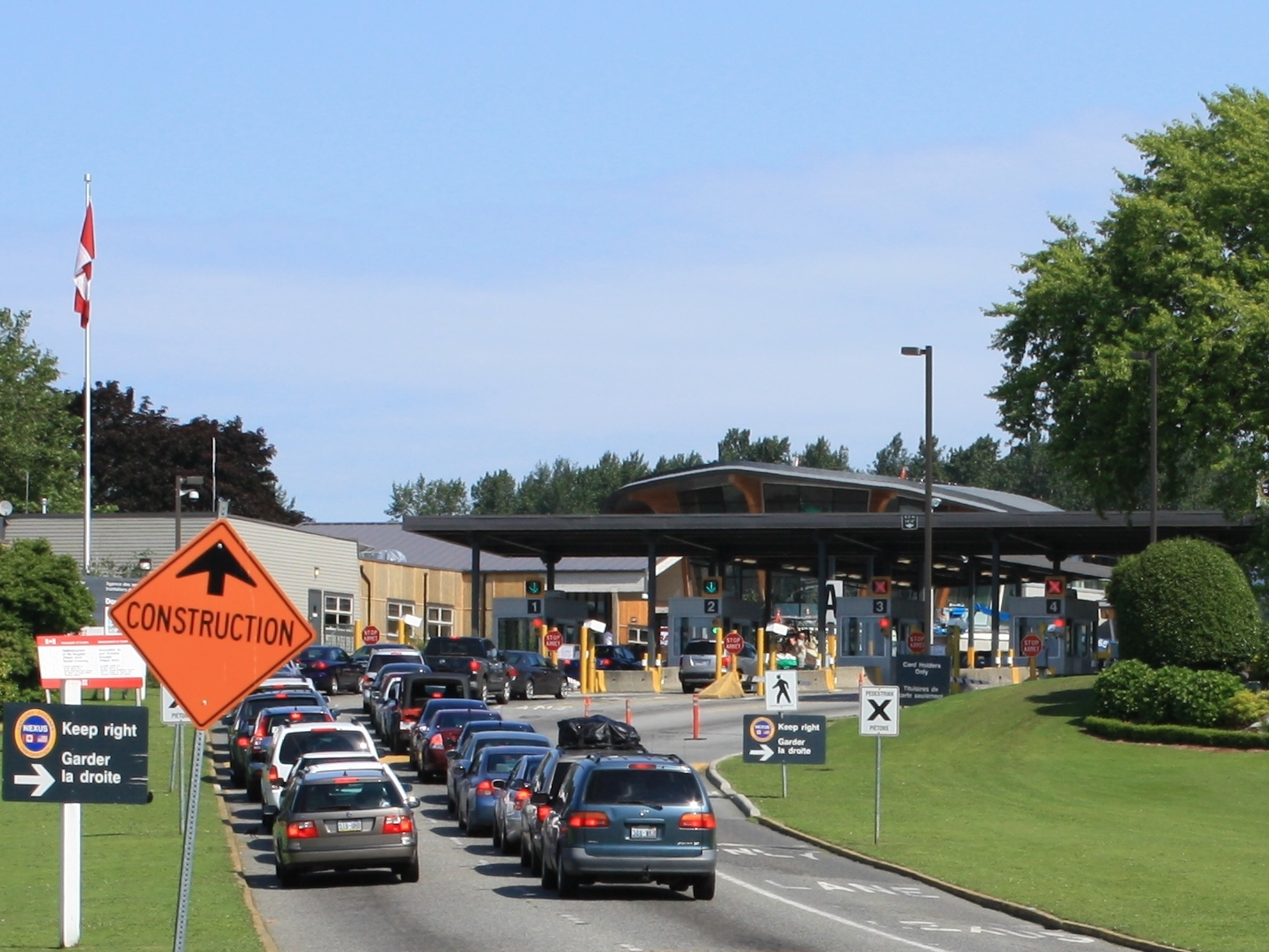
Cars approaching the Canadian border at Surrey, B.C. in Canada, from Blaine, Washington (state) in the United States at the Peace Arch Border Crossing

U.S. citizens and permanent residents entering Canada by land are required to possess the requisite documentation, such as a passport, driver's license, and other valid identification documents or they will be detained. They must also meet other criteria, such as passing security measures, before they are allowed entry into Canada. Consequently, travelers must also meet the requirements for re-entering the U.S. at the end of their visit.

== Visitor entry into Canada ==
Entry into Canada is determined solely by Canada Border Services Agency (CBSA) officials in accordance with Canadian law. Visitors are required to have the necessary travel documentation and be in good health. If asked, they must satisfy an immigration officer of ties to their country of origin, such as a job, home, and family. They must also satisfy the officer that they will leave Canada at the end of their visit. Additionally, they must have sufficient money for their stay, and all items belonging to an individual, including the vehicle the individual may be traveling in, are subject to be searched by the CBSA.

== Documentation ==
Canadian law requires that all people entering Canada carry proof of both citizenship and identity. A valid U.S. passport or passport card is preferred, although a birth certificate, naturalization certificate, citizenship certificate, or another document proving U.S. nationality, together with a government-issued photo ID (such as a driver's license) are acceptable to establish identity and nationality. However, the documents required to return to the United States can be more restrictive (for example, a birth certificate and photo ID are insufficient) – see the section below on Return entry into the U.S.

=== Enhanced driver's licenses ===
An enhanced driver's license (EDL), currently issued by the states of Michigan, Minnesota, New York, Vermont, and Washington, is specifically designed to meet the requirements of the Western Hemisphere Travel Initiative (WHTI) to re-enter the United States via a land or water border. An EDL will also suffice as proof of identity and citizenship for American citizens entering Canada via land and marine ports of entry.

=== NEXUS/FAST ===
NEXUS is a joint U.S./Canadian program for pre-approved, low-risk travelers and requires an extensive background check and face to face interview with border officials of both nations. FAST (Free and Secure Trade) is the equivalent for international truck drivers. Membership in either program can expedite border clearance through the use of dedicated lanes.

=== United States permanent residents ===
United States permanent residents are required to show their Permanent Resident Card (green card). No passport or visa is required.

=== Minors 15 and under ===
Children under 16 need only present proof of U.S. citizenship. Nevertheless, it is recommended that identification for children be carried anyway. Any person under 18 traveling alone requires a letter from a parent or guardian granting permission to travel to Canada. The letter must state the traveler's name and the duration of the trip.

A divorced parent who has or shares custody of a child should carry a copy of the custody document. An adult who is not the parent or legal guardian of a child they are accompanying should have written permission from the parents or guardians to supervise the child. When traveling in a group of vehicles, parents or guardians should be in the same vehicle as their children when arriving at the border. CBSA personnel are looking for missing children and may question adults about children traveling with them.

=== Documentation for vehicles ===
Persons driving into Canada must have their vehicle's registration document and proof of insurance.

== Visas and admissibility ==
A visa is not required for U.S. citizens to visit Canada for up to 180 days. Anyone seeking to enter Canada for any purpose besides a visit (e.g. to work, study or immigrate) must qualify for the appropriate entry status and can see the Canadian immigration website. The Canadian embassy or nearest consulate can be contacted for additional information.

=== Inadmissibility ===
"Allowed to Leave Canada" form (as of 2008) issued by CIC to an inadmissible person

Some persons are inadmissible—they are not allowed to enter Canada.

As of 2011, if a person is denied entry and advised to re-enter the U.S., they are issued form IMM 1282B. This form indicates that the person is allowed to withdraw their application to enter Canada, and is allowed to leave Canada. Persons who have been denied entry and provided this form are advised by the CBSA to show this form to the U.S. Customs and Border Protection (CBP). There appears to be no legal precedent, however, for the traveler to voluntarily submit this form to the CBP, and doing so may cause the CBP to consider the traveler suspicious, and as a result they may subject the traveler to exhaustive questioning and search. Information about the denial of entry may nevertheless be automatically and immediately available to the CBP.

==== Grounds for inadmissibility ====
Individuals may be refused entry to or removed from Canada on the following grounds:

- Security reasons, including espionage, subversion, violence or terrorism, or membership in an organization involved in such activities.
- Human or international rights violations.
- Criminality.
- Organized crime, including membership in an organization that takes part in organized criminal activity.
- Health reasons, if their condition is likely to endanger public health or public safety, or might reasonably be expected to cause excessive demands on health or social services.
- Financial reasons, if they are unable or unwilling to support themselves and their family members.
- Misrepresentation, which includes providing false information or withholding information directly related to decisions made under Canada's Immigration and Refugee Protection Act (IRPA).
- Failure to comply with any provision of IRPA. For instance, an attempt by persons who, having previously been deported from Canada, seek to enter Canada without written authorization.
- Having an inadmissible family member.

==== Avoiding inadmissibility ====
Persons can be denied entry into Canada on the basis of suspicion alone. In particular, the CBSA may deny entry to persons they doubt will be able to support themselves and their dependents, or whose willingness and means to return to the U.S. is in doubt. Certain documents, such as the following, can serve to reduce these doubts:

- Evidence of financial support, such as bank statements and passbooks.
- Income tax records, both recent and past.
- Evidence of employment, such as recent pay stubs, employment ID, and current letter from employer.
- Proof of residence, such as recent rent receipts, and copies of mortgage, deed, and utility bills.
- Confirmed means of departure from Canada, such as an airline, bus or train ticket with date and time of departure indicated.
- Information about destination in Canada, including destination address, destination telephone number, and name of the person being visited.

==== Criminal inadmissibility ====
A single criminal conviction, no matter how long ago, can be grounds for exclusion from Canada. With the exception of civil traffic violations such as speeding, and some municipal ordinance infractions (which are typically not handled through the legal system) such as parking violations or littering, persons with a conviction must either have received a pardon, applied for and been accepted for rehabilitation, met the requirement to be considered deemed rehabilitated, or if ineligible for rehabilitation or deemed rehabilitated status, apply for and receive a temporary resident permit (a special type of visa) to enter Canada.

Individuals with a criminal conviction that has been expunged are generally allowed entry into Canada.

===== Rehabilitation =====
To be a candidate for rehabilitation, at least five years (or more depending on the severity of the offense) since the conclusion of any sentence imposed (imprisonment, probation, fine paid, suspension of driver's license, etc ... ) must have elapsed. Due to differences between legal systems, an overturned conviction or dismissed charges does not automatically overcome inadmissibility, unless the offense itself occurred in Canada. However, applicants in either of these situations can use an abbreviated process and the five-year waiting period generally does not apply. In simple cases, such as a single misdemeanor conviction, the application can typically be reviewed and approved by a Canadian Embassy, High Counsel, or CIC office. For more complicated histories or in the case of a felony conviction, the application will need to be forwarded to Ottawa for approval. Processing time in either case can take several months to a year or more, so it is advisable to begin the process of applying for rehabilitation well in advance of any planned travel to Canada. Factors considered when determining whether to approve an application for rehabilitation or not include the nature of the offense, the time elapsed and one's behavior since the offense was committed or since the sentence. Applicants are required to obtain clearances from law enforcement in the communities in which they have lived, and are strongly urged to submit documentation showing stability and reform such as records of employment and any education or treatment programs completed, as well as character references.

A person with a past conviction can also be "deemed rehabilitated" by an immigration officer at the port of entry. Ten years must have elapsed since the conclusion of any sentence imposed and other criteria must be satisfied. Persons attempting to enter under the deemed rehabilitated system should also bring law enforcement clearances, documents showing a stable and reformed life, and character references, as the decision as to whether to admit someone as deemed rehabilitated is completely at the discretion of the border official and there is no recourse or right of appeal should deemed rehabilitated status be denied. Anyone with a felony conviction (unless a pardon was granted) cannot be deemed rehabilitated and must instead apply for rehabilitation or a temporary resident permit.

===== Temporary resident permits =====
Temporary resident permits are a one-time authorization for someone who is otherwise criminally inadmissible to enter Canada. Permits are rarely granted without cause, typically only in extenuating circumstances (such as a documented family emergency), on significant humanitarian grounds (such as sponsoring an inadmissible spouse or child), or for reasons of Canadian national interest, or in circumstances where the reasons for criminal inadmissibility are negligible. TRP's are usually issued with varying restrictions and can be revoked if deemed necessary. Temporary resident permits can, however, be obtained by an individual who has a criminal record if it can be proven that he has been rehabilitated and is able to demonstrate that the need for him to enter Canada outweighs any risk that he may cause to Canada.

===== Inadmissible family member =====
If an individual is deemed inadmissible, members of their family may also be deemed inadmissible solely based on that fact.

===== Offenses committed as a minor =====
In theory, a person is not inadmissible if they were convicted of a crime before the age of 18 and were tried as a young offender or through the juvenile justice system. If the person in question could have been tried as an adult (which is frequently the case in the US, where minors as young as 8 can be tried as an adult), regardless of whether they actually were or not, they are inadmissible.

=== Policies ===
==== Importation of firearms ====
Firearms are much more strictly controlled in Canada than in the U.S. Visitors bringing any firearms into Canada, or planning to borrow and use firearms while in Canada, are required to declare the firearms in writing using a Non-Resident Firearm Declaration form. Multiple firearms can be declared at the same time. Upon acceptance, this declaration serves as a temporary license and registration certificate for up to 60 days. The Non-Resident Firearm Declaration has a cost of $25. Visitors planning to borrow a firearm in Canada are required to obtain in advance a Temporary Firearms Borrowing License, the cost of which is $30 (Canadian), payable at the border. These forms are required to be signed before a CBSA officer at the border. Note that the forms are not available at the border itself. Details and downloadable forms are provided by the Canadian Firearms Program.

Canada has three classes of firearms: non-restricted, restricted, and prohibited. Non-restricted firearms include most ordinary hunting rifles and shotguns. These can be brought temporarily into Canada for sporting or hunting use during hunting season, use in competitions, in-transit movement through Canada, or personal protection against wildlife in remote areas of Canada. Any person wishing to bring a hunting rifle into Canada is required to be at least 18 years old, and the firearm must be properly stored for transport. Restricted firearms are primarily handguns. A restricted firearm may be brought into Canada, but an Authorization to Transport permit must be obtained in advance from a chief firearms officer. Prohibited firearms include fully automatic, converted automatics and assault-type weapons. Prohibited firearms are not allowed into Canada. A comprehensive guide on importation of firearms and weapons is published by the CBSA.

It is recommended that the Canadian embassy or a consulate, or the Canadian Firearms Program be contacted for detailed information and instructions on temporarily importing firearms in advance of any travel. In all cases, travelers are required to declare to Canadian authorities any firearms and weapons in their possession when entering Canada. If a traveler is denied permission to bring in the firearm, there may be facilities near border crossings where firearms may be stored, pending the traveler's return to the U.S. Canadian law requires that officials confiscate firearms and weapons from those crossing the border that deny having them in their possession. Confiscated firearms and weapons are never returned. Possession of an undeclared firearm can result in a five-year prison sentence.

==== Items requiring declaration ====
Food, plants, animals and related products are required to be declared when entering Canada using a declaration form. Once declared, a CBSA officer will ask questions about these items, such as their country of origin or intended use. The items may be inspected. Non-allowable items are either seized, disposed of, or ordered removed from Canada.

A failure to declare can lead to confiscation of products, fines of up to $400 (Canadian) per undeclared item, as well as prosecution. Persons wishing to dispose product needing declaration can do so in product disposal bins.

==== Prohibited items ====
Electronic media of travelers entering Canada can be randomly checked. Computers and mobile phone are subject to search without a warrant at the border, and illegal content can result in the seizure of the electronic device as well as detention, arrest and prosecution of the bearer. Agents may access or otherwise view contents of online accounts and services if your electronic device contains saved passwords or access tokens.

Certain weapons that may be legal to possess in the U.S. are prohibited weapons in Canada, most notably pepper spray, mace and Tasers. Under the Canadian Criminal Code, a person can face a maximum of five years in prison for unauthorized possession and five years for unauthorized importation of an illegal weapon. If, however, it can be proven that the person, despite knowing that its importation or possession is illegal, imports or possess a prohibited weapon, the maximum penalty increases to ten years imprisonment.

Canadian law prohibits the unlawful importation or trafficking of controlled substances and narcotics.

It is recommended that prescription medicines be in their original prescription container. Suspicious looking or unidentifiable pills found during a search can be tested for narcotics. Entry into Canada can be delayed until the tests have completed. Moreover, their discovery can lead to being denied entry even if the tests passed.

=== Handling disagreements ===
A person or organization may disagree with the CBSA about an assessment or decision made by the CBSA. If at the border, the Border Services Officers (BSO) or superintendent can be consulted. To address disagreements afterwards, a CBSA office can be contacted.

==== Appeals ====
Persons who believe that they have not received their full entitlements under Canadian law, and have been unable to reach an agreement with the CBSA on a duty or penalty matter, have the right to a formal review of their file. A formal review is conducted by appeals representatives who were not involved in the original decision, and is impartial. Appeals staff are trained to review the client's and the CBSA's facts and reasons.

The role of the appeals representative who reviews a case is to carry out a complete, professional, and impartial review. This representative reviews the case by interpreting acts administered by the CBSA and reviewing CBSA policies, considering the appellant's point of view; and when necessary, asking for a technical opinion from CBSA experts or seeking legal advice from the Canadian Department of Justice.

The representative who reviews the case will not have been involved in the original assessment, determination, or ruling of a duty, penalty or other matter. The appellant can discuss the case with an appeals representative, and has the right to obtain certain documents related to the case.

=== Business visits ===
A business visitor is someone who comes to Canada to engage in international business activities without directly entering the Canadian labor market. Such visitors may be in Canada for business meetings or site visits (to observe only), but not to work. Business visitors are required to prove that their main source of income and their main place of business are outside Canada.

A visa is not required for a business visitor who is an American citizen. All business visitors are required to have a passport valid until the end of their stay, a letter of support from their parent company, a letter of invitation from the Canadian host business, a copy of any contracts or bills to support the visit, 24-hour contact details of the business host in Canada, and proof of enough money for both the stay in Canada and the return home. Business visitors do not need a temporary work permit unless they plan on doing executive, managerial, technical or production work.

== Return entry into the U.S. ==
=== Documentation ===
Beginning in 2009, U.S. citizens aged 16 and older traveling into the U.S. from Canada by land or sea (including ferries) have had to present documents denoting citizenship and identity, which include a valid U.S. passport, U.S. passport card, Trusted Traveler Program card (NEXUS, SENTRI, Global Entry or FAST), an Enhanced Driver's License, U.S. Military identification card when traveling on official orders, U.S. Merchant Mariner document when traveling in conjunction with official maritime business, Form I-872 American Indian Card, or (when available) Enhanced Tribal Card. Children under age 16 (or under 19, if traveling with a school, religious group, or other youth group) need only to present a birth certificate issued by an appropriate state or local authority, or a Naturalization Certificate. Persons who do not present acceptable documents may be delayed as U.S. Customs and Border Protection officers at the port of entry attempt to verify identity and citizenship.

=== Searches ===
The U.S. Customs and Border Protection has the authority from the U.S. Congress to conduct searches of persons and their baggage, cargo, and means of transportation entering the United States.

=== Policies ===
Certain items such as monetary instruments over U.S. $10,000, hunting trophies, and firearms require a declaration. Prescription medicines are required to be in their original prescription container. Prohibited items include absinthe, biological materials, endangered species and products thereof; explosives, including fireworks; some fruits, vegetables, and meats; narcotics and paraphernalia, pornographic materials, seditious or treasonable matter, and switchblade knives (except by one-armed persons). Pets must be accompanied with a valid rabies vaccination certificate.

== Expedited entry ==
Wait times for vehicles at popular border crossings can sometimes be excessive on either side of the border. It is recommended that the estimated wait time be checked in advance of travel. These are provided by both the CBSA and the CBP.

Both the U.S. and Canadian governments urge frequent travelers to join the NEXUS trusted traveler program. NEXUS members receive a card that allows expedited border crossings for both private and commercial travelers through both U.S. and Canada border controls quickly.

== See also ==
- Canada–United States border
- List of Canada–United States border crossings
- Canada–United States relations
- United States border security concerns
