= Concealed carry =

Practice of carrying a hidden weapon in public

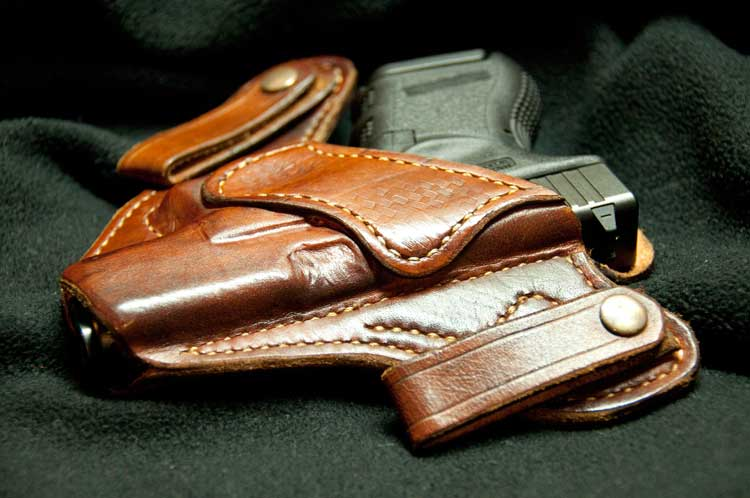
An inside the waistband (IWB) concealment holster, which clips or mounts to a belt and allows the user to securely holster the weapon inside the pants. Some IWB holsters give the wearer the option of tucking a shirt over the firearm and holster.

Concealed carry, or carrying a concealed weapon (CCW), is the practice of carrying a weapon (usually a sidearm such as a handgun), either in proximity to or on one's person in public places in a manner that hides or conceals the weapon's presence from surrounding observers. In the United States, the opposite of concealed carry is called open carry.

While most law enforcement officers carry their handguns in a visible holster, some officers such as plainclothes detectives or undercover agents carry weapons in concealed holsters. In some countries and jurisdictions, civilians are legally required to obtain a concealed carry permit in order to possess and carry a firearm. In others, a CCW permit is only required if the firearm is not visible to the eye, such as carrying the weapon in one's purse, bag, trunk, etc.

== By country ==
=== United States ===
A New York Times study reported how outcomes of active shooter attacks varied with actions of the attacker, the police (42% of total incidents), and bystanders (including a "good guy with a gun" outcome in 5.1% of total incidents).

Concealed carry is legal in most jurisdictions of the United States. A handful of states and jurisdictions severely restrict or ban it, but all jurisdictions make provision for legal concealed carry via a permit or license, or via constitutional carry. Illinois was the last state to pass a law allowing for concealed carry, with license applications available on January 5, 2014. Most states that require a permit have "shall-issue" statutes, and if a person meets the requirements to obtain a permit, the issuing authority (typically, a state law enforcement office such as the state police) must issue one, with no discretionary power given. Prior to June 2022, a few states enforced "may-issue" statutes, which gave authorities discretionary power in issuing permits to otherwise qualified applicants. However, these laws were found to be unconstitutional by the U.S. Supreme Court in New York State Rifle & Pistol Association, Inc. v. Bruen. Furthermore, in most states obtaining the permit is required to bring a weapon into public, (e.g. shopping center). If the gun remains in one's vehicle but is not on said person's property, a permit is required in places like New Jersey.

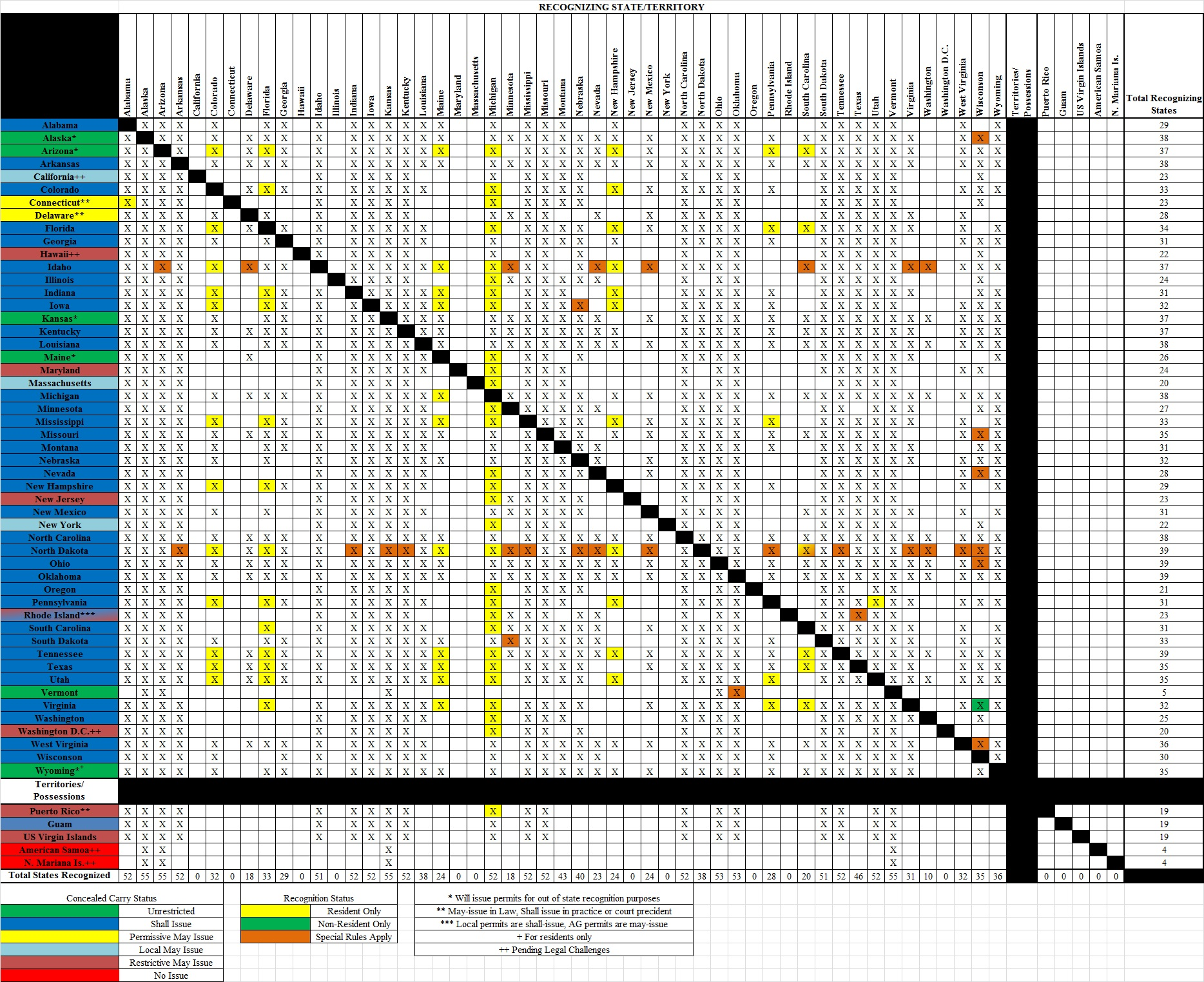
Concealed-carry recognition by state (2017)

Further complicating the status of concealed carry is recognition of state permits under the laws of other states. The Full Faith and Credit Clause of the US Constitution pertains to judgments and other legal pronouncements such as marriage and divorce rather than licenses and permits that authorize individuals to prospectively engage in activities. There are several popular combinations of resident and nonresident permits that allow carry in more states than the original issuing state; for example, a Utah nonresident permit is recognized for carry in 30 states. Some states, however, do not recognize permits issued by other states to nonresidents of the issuing state: Colorado, Florida, Maine, Michigan, New Hampshire, North Dakota and South Carolina. Some other states do not recognize any permit from another state: California, Connecticut, Hawaii, Illinois (recognizes permits while in vehicle), Maryland, Massachusetts, New Jersey, New York, Oregon, Rhode Island (recognizes permits while in vehicle) and the District of Columbia.

=== United Kingdom ===
Concealed or open carry of any weapon is generally prohibited in Great Britain (i.e. England, Wales, and Scotland), the Prevention of Crime Act 1953 prohibiting this in a public place. Permission exists only with lawful authority or reasonable excuse. As per Section 1(4) Prevention of Crime Act 1953, the definition of an offensive weapon is: "offensive weapon" means any article made or adapted for use for causing injury to the person, or intended by the person having it with him for such use by him or by some other person. Self defence is no longer considered a legitimate reason for the granting of a Firearms Certificate (FAC) in Great Britain.

Unlike Great Britain, Northern Ireland still allows the carry of concealed handguns for the purpose of self defence. An FAC for a personal protection weapon will only be authorised where the Police Service of Northern Ireland deems there is a "verifiable specific risk" to the life of an individual, and that the possession of a firearm is a reasonable, proportionate and necessary measure to protect their life. Permits for personal protection also allow the holder to carry their firearms concealed. In reality – aside from off-duty constables – the only individuals who will be granted a permit to carry will be those who are government officials or retirees, such as prison officers, military personnel, or politicians still considered to be at risk from paramilitary attack.

=== Canada ===
The practice of CCW is generally prohibited in Canada. Section 90 of the Criminal Code prohibits carrying a concealed weapon unless authorized for a lawful occupational purpose under the Firearms Act. Section 20 of the Firearms Act allows issuance of an Authorization to Carry (ATC) in limited circumstances. Concealment of the firearm is permitted only if it is specifically stipulated in the conditions of the ATC, as section 58(1) of the Firearms Act allows a CFO to attach conditions to an ATC.

Provincial chief firearm officers (CFOs) may only issue an authorization in accordance with the regulations. Specifically, SOR 98-207 section 2 requires, for an ATC for protection of life, for an individual to be in imminent danger and for police protection to be insufficient. As such, if the relevant police agency determines its protection is sufficient, the CFO would have difficulty in issuing the ATC over police objections.

For issuance of an ATC under 98-207(3) for lawful occupations, provision is made for armored car personnel under subsection a), for wildlife protection (while working) and trapping under subsections b) and c). Unless hunting or other activity is occupational, it would not be possible to issue an ATC under the section. As noted, a CFO can exercise some discretion but must follow the law in considering applications for an ATC.

=== Brazil ===
Concealed carry in Brazil is generally illegal, with special carry permits granted to police officers allowing them to carry firearms off duty, and in other rare cases. In May 2019, President Jair Bolsonaro signed a decree allowing several people to have license to carry a weapon based on the intrinsic risk of the profession, including lawyers, reporters and politicians.

=== Czech Republic ===
A gun in the Czech Republic is available to anybody subject to acquiring a shall-issue firearms license. Gun licenses may be obtained in a way similar to driving licenses – by passing a gun proficiency exam, medical examination and having a clean criminal record. Unlike in most other European countries, the Czech gun legislation also permits a citizen to carry a concealed weapon for self-defense – 246,715 out of some 303,936 legal gun owners have E category licenses which permit them to carry concealed firearms. The vast majority of Czech gun owners possess their firearms for protection, with hunting and sport shooting being less common.

Hunters who hold C category licenses may carry their hunting firearms openly on the way to and from hunting grounds.

Unlike state policemen, members of the municipal police are regarded as civilians and need to obtain D category licenses in order to be armed. Municipal policemen while on duty carry their municipality-issued firearms openly. D category license holders who work in private security services can carry their firearms only in a concealed manner.

All firearms licenses are shall-issue.

| License category | Age | Carrying |
|---|---|---|
| A - Firearm collection | 21 | No carry |
| B - Sport shooting | 18; 15 for members of a shooting club | Transport only (concealed, in a manner excluding immediate use) |
| C - Hunting | 18; 16 for pupils at schools with hunting curriculum | Transport only (open/concealed, in a manner excluding immediate use) |
| D - Exercise of profession | 21; 18 for pupils at schools conducting education on firearms or ammunition manufacturing | Concealed carry (up to 2 guns ready for immediate use); Open carry for members of municipal police, Czech National Bank's security while on duty |
| E - Self-defense | 21 | Concealed carry (up to 2 guns ready for immediate use) |

=== Mexico ===
In Mexico, the issuance of a private individual firearms license, despite being guaranteed as a right in Article 10 of the 1917 Constitution, is neither common nor easy to obtain. Article 10 of the Constitution quotes:

The inhabitants of the United Mexican States have the right to possess arms in their homes, for their security and legitimate defense, with the exception of federal law and those reserved for the exclusive use of the Army, Navy, Air Force and National Guard. Federal law shall determine the cases, conditions, requirements and places in which inhabitants may be authorized to carry weapons.

Even when a carrying permit is granted, it is usually limited to weapons permitted for civilians (also called "non-exclusive military use"). The carrying of arms in Mexico is limited to those detailed in Articles 8 and 9 of the Federal Law on Firearms and Explosives.2 which states

Weapons with the following characteristics may be possessed or carried, under the terms and with the limitations established by this Law:

I. I. Semi-automatic pistols of caliber no greater than .380" (9 mm), with the exception of .38" Super and .38" Comando calibers, and also in 9 mm calibers, Mauser, Luger, Parabellum and Comando, as well as similar models of the same caliber of the exempted ones, of other brands.

II. Revolvers in calibers not superior to .38" Special, being excepted the caliber .357" Magnum.

Ejidatarios, comuneros and rural workers, outside urban areas, may possess and carry with the only demonstration, one of the aforementioned weapons, or a .22" caliber rifle, or a shotgun of any caliber, except those with a barrel length of less than 635 mm. (25"), and those with a caliber greater than 12 (.729" or 18.5 mm.).

III. Those mentioned in Article 10 of this Law.

IV. Those that form part of collections of arms, in the terms of Articles 21 and 22.

The issuance of carrying licences in Mexico is similar to the United States "may-issue" model, in which the authorities responsible for issuing such licences (Secretariat of National Defense) reserve the right to issue them at their discretion.

=== Pakistan ===
Pakistan allows any citizen with a firearm licence to carry a concealed handgun, except in educational institutions, hostels or boarding and lodging houses, fairs, gatherings or processions of a political, religious, ceremonial or sectarian character, and on the premises of courts of law or public offices.

=== Philippines ===
Concealed carry in the Philippines requires a Permit To Carry (PTC), which may be issued to licensed firearms owners based on threats to their lives or because of the inherent risk of their profession. The Permit to Carry must be renewed annually.

During gun ban, which is the time of election or as declared by the president, no civilian can carry a gun outside residence even with PTC.

In some private learning institutions, CCW (Carrying Concealed Weapon) is permitted by the management of the institution. Here are the necessary scenarios for a student to request or have a CCW in the institution: When a student is a possible target of life, if the student has experienced sexual harassment, if the student is a VIP student, etc. The student/s may be restricted to 1 non lethal weapon. VIP students and endangered students are immune to the gun ban during all elections. Permit to Carry is signed by the institution for the student.

=== Poland ===
Polish firearm licences for handguns allow concealed carry, regardless of whether they are given for self defence or sporting reasons. Self defence licences are only for those the police consider at heightened risk of attack, and are rare. Sports shooting licences require active participation in competitions every year.

=== South Africa ===
In South Africa, it is legal to carry all licensed firearms and there is no additional permit required to carry firearms open or concealed, as long as it is a licensed firearm that is carried:

- in the case of a handgun, in a holster or similar holder designed, manufactured or adapted for the carrying of a handgun and attached to his or her person or in a rucksack or similar holder.
- in the case of any other firearm, in a holder designed, manufactured or adapted for the carrying of the firearm.

A firearm contemplated in subsection must be completely covered and the person carrying the firearm must be able to exercise effective control over the firearm (carrying firearms in public is allowed if it is done in that manner).

In South Africa, private guns are prohibited in educational institutions, churches, community centres, health facilities, NGOs, taverns, banks, corporate buildings, government buildings and some public spaces, such as sport stadiums.

=== Slovakia ===
Concealed carry in Slovakia is not common and subject to generally permissive may-issue license (depends on jurisdiction; some are essentially shall-issue, while others don't issue without bribe or verifiable proof to being in danger), only 2% of the population hold a licence allowing concealed carry.

== See also ==
- Defensive gun use
- Gun politics
- Open carry
- Self-defense
- Students for Concealed Carry
- Weapon possession (crime)
