= Canadian Firearms Registry =

Gun registry of Canada

- Registre canadien des armes à feu

Agency overview
- Formed: 1993
- Jurisdiction: Registration of prohibited and restricted firearms
- Headquarters: Ottawa, Ontario, Canada
- Minister responsible: Gary Anandasangaree, Minister of Public Safety
- Agency executive: Michael Duheme, Commissioner of Firearms
- Parent agency: Canadian Firearms Program

The Canadian Firearms Registry (French: Registre canadien des armes à feu) is the gun registry of Canada, requiring the registration of all restricted and prohibited firearms in the country. It is managed by the Canadian Firearms Program of the Royal Canadian Mounted Police (RCMP) as part of the RCMP's responsibilities under the Firearms Act.

The registry was introduced by the Liberal government of Prime Minister Jean Chrétien in 1993 and implemented by successive justice ministers Allan Rock and Anne McLellan. The net annual operating cost of the program was originally estimated to be $2 million.

Originally, the program required the registration of all non-restricted firearms but this requirement was dropped on April 6, 2012, by the coming into force of Bill C-19. Bill C-19 also mandated the destruction of the non-restricted records of the registry as soon as feasible. The province of Quebec immediately filed a request for an injunction to prevent the destruction of the data. A temporary injunction was granted by the Superior Court of Quebec on April 5, 2012 to prevent the data for Quebec residents from being destroyed until legal arguments could be heard. On March 27, 2015, the Supreme Court of Canada ruled in Quebec (AG) v Canada (AG) that the destruction of long-gun registry records was within the constitutional power of Parliament to make criminal law, denying the Government of Quebec's legal challenge and allowing for those records to be destroyed.

== History ==
Canada had a gun registry during the Second World War, when all people were compelled to register their firearms out of fear of enemy subversion. This registry in Canada was discontinued after the war; however, all handguns (restricted) have been subject to registration since 1934. In addition, fully automatic firearms have been prohibited (with grandfathering exemptions to existing, licensed collectors of full-automatic weapons and theatrical users) since 1977. A Firearms Acquisition Certificate (FAC) was required to purchase any firearm since its implementation in 1977, although additional restrictions applied for handguns (restricted - 1934) and fully automatic firearms (prohibited −1977). To obtain an FAC, no training was required until the Canadian Firearms Safety Course and Test program (non-restricted, restricted, or combined courses/tests) was created as a prerequisite in Bill C-17 in 1991. This formal training, once common in families and even schools, has been credited with the marked reduction of accidents involving the improper handling of firearms. Under bill C-17 (1991), and subsequent legislation and/or orders in council, short-barreled handguns and those firing .25 ACP and .32 ACP ammunition, and all handguns with a barrel length under 105mm (~4.1"), with the exception of certain guns typically used in shooting competitions, were added to the list of prohibited firearms. In addition, a large reclassification of firearms was made to place many firearms with certain cosmetic and functional characteristics into the category and registration of 'restricted' or 'prohibited' firearms. Some classes of these firearms have also been subject to grandfathering provisions of the law to owners and collectors, including some limited allowances of willing/gifting certain prohibited firearms to a family member to preserve them for historic value as pre-1945 collectors pieces.

The École Polytechnique massacre—a mass shooting incident on December 6, 1989, in which Marc Lépine used a Mini-14 rifle to shoot 28 people, including 14 women killed, before committing suicide—sparked a substantial rise in activism to tighten Canada's gun licensing and registry legislation. The first steps toward the Canadian long-gun registry began under the federal Progressive Conservative Party government of Prime Minister Kim Campbell. It was the child of former Conservative Senator Nathan Nurgitz, who wrote then Prime Minister Campbell requesting all guns be registered.

- May 1990 – Justice Minister Kim Campbell introduces Bill C-80, which improves the FAC screening process, defines safe storage, bans some military weapons and large-capacity magazines, but, notably, does not ban semi-automatic rifles such as the Ruger Mini-14, register non-restricted firearms, or control the sale of ammunition.
- November 1990 – In an almost unprecedented turn of events, because of opposition in Kim Campbell's own Conservative caucus, Bill C-80 fails second reading and is sent to a "Special Committee."
- November 1990 – February 1991 – The Special Committee on Bill C-80 conducts hearings.
- March 1991 – Parliament prorogues and Bill C-80 dies on the order paper.
- April 1991 – Student activists from l'École Polytechnique, along with family members of the victims of the massacre, police organizations, health care professionals, organized labor, and others banded together with the existing Canadians for Gun Control organization to form the Coalition for Gun Control. The Coalition holds its first national press conference in Ottawa with representatives from the Canadian Police Association, Canadian Association of Chiefs of Police, the Victims of Polytechnique, the Canadian Criminal Justice Association, and others calling on the Government to reintroduce gun-control legislation.
- May 1991 – Justice Minister Kim Campbell unveils Bill C-17, a revised version of Bill C-80. The first witness, the Minister of Justice, argues that the Standing Committee on Justice and the Solicitor General do not need to conduct extensive hearings but should send the bill back to the House of Commons for third reading. Gun organizations push for hearings in an effort to weaken the bill. Gun-control advocates push for hearings in order to strengthen the bill. The National Action Committee on the Status of Women storms the hearings, arguing that women have the right to be heard, and the bill is subsequently sent to the Standing Committee on Justice and the Solicitor General.
- May–September 1991 – The Legislative Committee hears witnesses on both sides. This time, the Coalition for Gun Control appears with support from health-care, crime-prevention and other experts. Its position is endorsed by over 50 groups and 5000 individuals. The Canadian Advisory Council on the Status of Women recommends improvements to the bill to counter problems with guns in domestic violence. Both the Canadian Police Association and Canadian Association of Chiefs of Police advocate registration of all firearms. In response to an advertising campaign by the gun lobby, the Coalition issues a joint statement in support of Bill C-17, with additional measures such as registration of all firearms. The statement is signed by hundreds of community leaders, chiefs of police, and violence-prevention organizations and issued to all MPs and Senators. A campaign by the Coalition lands over 300,000 postcards on MPs' desks, calling for amendments to strengthen the law. The Liberal and NDP parties support the position of the Coalition for Gun Control advocating licensing of firearm owners and registration of firearms.
- November 7, 1991 – The House of Commons passes Bill C-17. Members of all four political parties acknowledge the efforts of the Coalition for Gun Control.
- November–December 1991 – The Senate Committee on Legal and Constitutional Affairs reviews the legislation. Priscilla DeVilliers, whose daughter Nina was killed months earlier, and John Bickerstaff, whose son Lee was accidentally killed by a friend playing with his father's service revolver, testify.
- December 5, 1991 – Bill C-17 passes Senate. Legal and Constitutional Affairs Chair, Senator Nathan Nurgitz, writes to Justice Minister Kim Campbell advising her to look carefully at the regulations and to registration of all firearms.

=== Bill C-68 ===
The Firearms Act was created by Bill C-68, An Act Respecting Firearms and Other Weapons, which was introduced in 1993, and aimed at the licensing of all gun owners and registration of all firearms. The bill also classified replica firearms as prohibited devices, with those already owned being grandfathered. It was passed by Parliament and given Royal Assent in 1995. The Canadian Firearms Centre was established in 1996 to oversee the administration of its measures.

The registration portion of the Firearms Act was implemented in 1995 and the deadline for gun owners to register their non-restricted firearms was January 1, 2003. There is disagreement on the percentage of gun-owners who complied with the registry. The Law-Abiding Unregistered Firearms Association estimated that over 70% of all firearms in Canada were never registered. Meanwhile, the Coalition for Gun Control claimed that ninety per cent of all gun owners registered their firearms, representing ninety percent of guns.

== Debate on the registry ==
=== Initial opposition ===
Political opposition to the registry, particularly outside of Canada's major cities, was immediate. The provincial governments of Alberta, Ontario, Nova Scotia, New Brunswick and Newfoundland and Labrador also attacked the bill arguing it exceeded the federal government's mandate and arguing that it was too expensive; however the Supreme Court ruled in favour of the registry in Reference re Firearms Act.

The Conservative Party of Canada campaigned for many years to repeal portions of the registry related to non-restricted firearms and did so on April 5, 2012.

=== Cost overruns ===
The registry again became a political issue in the early 2000s when cost overruns were reported.

In early 2000, the Canadian Firearms Program released a report that showed that implementation costs were rising. Major backlogs in registration—largely as a result of firearm owners waiting until the last minute to apply—general increase in costs, fee waivers for early applications, and high error rates in applications submitted by firearm owners were all cited as contributing factors to the rising costs.

In December 2002, the Auditor General of Canada, Sheila Fraser, reported that the project was running vastly above initial cost estimates. The report showed that the implementation of the firearms registry program by the Department of Justice has had significant strategic and management problems throughout. Taxpayers were originally expected to pay only $2 million of the budget while registration fees would cover the rest. In 1995, the Department of Justice reported to Parliament that the system would cost $119 million to implement, and that the income generated from licensing fees would be $117 million. This gives a net cost of $2 million. At the time of the 2002 audit, however, the revised estimates from the Department of Justice were that the cost of the whole gun control program would be more than $1 billion by 2004-05 and that the income from licence fees in the same period would be $140 million.

Information technology expenditures were disproportionally high especially throughout the program’s early development. However, the program was not exceptional compared to other government-run programs with large IT projects. A 2006 report by the Auditor General regarding large IT Projects demonstrates that after more than a full decade of IT projects had passed within the government since its last IT audit, and whereby a TB Framework had been developed for IT, only two of the seven large IT projects assessed met all audit criteria for well-managed projects. When CFP was merged into the RCMP in 2006, IT comprised almost 50% of total program expenditures – the industry standard is 20-30%. By 2009, costs had stabilized to 21-27% of direct program expenditures and were expected to be reduced further within the existing RCMP IT architecture.

=== Allegations of improper lobbying ===
In January 2006, Tony Bernardo, director of the 12,000-member Canadian Shooting Sports Association, asked the RCMP to probe a Liberal Party consultant over a $380,000 contract that was awarded to lobby the federal government for funds for the ailing firearms registry. The five-month contract was awarded by the Justice Department in March 2003 to lobby the federal Solicitor General, Treasury Board and Privy Council, according to a detailed lobbyist report. No formal probe by the RCMP resulted. Bernardo asked rhetorically, "[isn't it] inappropriate for the Federal Government to hire a private lobbyist with taxpayers' dollars to lobby itself?"

=== Effects on public safety ===
There are conflicting views on the effectiveness of the Gun Registry from a public safety standpoint.

In a Canada Firearms Centre (CAFC) survey, 74% of general duty police officers stated that the registry "query results have proven beneficial during major operations.".

However, the Auditor General's report found that the program did not collect data to analyze the effectiveness of the gun registry in meeting its stated goal of improving public safety. The report states:

The performance report focuses on activities such as issuing licences and registering firearms. The Centre does not show how these activities help minimize risks to public safety with evidence-based outcomes such as reduced deaths, injuries and threats from firearms.

Former Ontario Provincial Police Commissioner Julian Fantino opposed the gun registry, stating in a press release in 2003:

We have an ongoing gun crisis including firearms-related homicides lately in Toronto, and a law registering firearms has neither deterred these crimes nor helped us solve any of them. None of the guns we know to have been used were registered, although we believe that more than half of them were smuggled into Canada from the United States. The firearms registry is long on philosophy and short on practical results considering the money could be more effectively used for security against terrorism as well as a host of other public safety initiatives."

However, in 2010, the OPP had representation on the Canadian Association of Chiefs of Police's (CACP) Special Subcommittee on Firearms, from January–August 2010, and voted in favour of retaining the long gun registry at the CACP AGM.

Meanwhile, Edgar MacLeod, former president of the CACP, states that "while the cost of the registry had become an embarrassment, the program works and provides a valuable service. In a typical domestic violence situation," he says, "investigating police officers rely on the registry to determine if guns are present. Onboard computers in police cruisers, or a call to central dispatch, alerts [sic] officers to any firearms registered to occupants of the house."

The CACP are strongly supportive of the gun registry, claiming that getting rid of the registry will make Canada less safe, and compromise the ability of law enforcement to deal effectively with gun violence. However, support for the registry among Chiefs of Police is not unanimous. There have also been questions raised regarding donations made to the CACP by CGI Group, the corporation behind the registry. These donations were partially responsible for the resignation of ethicist Dr. John Jones from the CACP's ethics committee. Furthermore, the Canadian Association of Chiefs of Police has been criticized for suppressing opposition to the registry among its own law enforcement officers. These allegations have been disputed.

There is also debate as to whether frontline police officers oppose the registry. Opponents of the registry cite an online straw poll to suggest 92% regular officers believe that the registry is ineffective and should be dismantled; that poll, conducted by Cst. Randy Kuntz of the Edmonton Police Service, was open to active police members only through an online forum in a popular police-related magazine where respondents were all confirmed Canadian police officers. In addition to this, Cst. Kuntz solicited input from members of police forces across Canada through various means of advertising to promote awareness of this poll. After approximately fourteen months, 2631 Canadian police officers (of about 69,000 total, or 3.8%) responded to this survey. Of the 2631 respondents, 2410 voted to scrap the registry. Meanwhile, an RCMP report shows 81% of police officers are in favour of the registry.

A survey in August 2010 revealed that 72 percent of Canadians believe the long-gun registry has done nothing to prevent crime. Organizations like the Canadian Taxpayers Federation have circulated petitions to end the registry and have collected tens of thousands of signatures supporting the elimination of the registry.

In April 2011, a survey was conducted by the Edmonton Police Association. Its members voted 81 percent in favour of scrapping the long-gun registry.

The coming into force of Bill C-19 removes the requirement to register 'non-restricted' firearms. All firearms classified as 'restricted' or 'prohibited' by law and orders in council in 1934, 1977, 1991, 1996, and subsequently would remain registered and unchanged. A Possession and Acquisition Licence (PAL), and the prerequisite course and exam, is mandatory to purchase or possess any firearm. Hunter education programs are a requirement of all hunters in Canada.

=== Privacy and security issues ===
The information contained in the firearms registry is available to police through the Canadian Police Information Centre (CPIC). This database is one of many applications which are protected under the National Police Service Network (NPSN).

In a 2001 Access to Information Request, the RCMP explained that they do not record statistics on which applications are targeted by hackers. As a result, they do not know how many times the Canadian Firearms Program (CFP) database has been breached. Chief Superintendent David Gork, Departmental Security Officer, is quoted as saying,

CPIC is but one of many applications that are protected on the NPSN (National Police Service Network) and attacks on the network cannot be broken down as to which application is the intent of the attack. In general, attacks are to gain access through the protective measures, and from there to 'look around' for opportunities as to where the attacker 'can go'. Therefore there are no stats that are collected that would indicate where any attacks are directed with the NPSN.

In his final response to the Access to Information request, the Information Commissioner concluded,

During the course of our investigation, my investigator met with officials from the RCMP and was provided with a detailed and comprehensive explanation regarding the department's security systems. They confirmed that CPIC is one of many applications protected within the National Police Service Network and there is no way of determining what application is being targeted, if an unauthorized access is being attempted.

John Hicks, an Orillia-area computer consultant, and webmaster for the Canada Firearms Centre, has said that anyone with a home computer could have easily accessed names, addresses and detailed shopping lists (including make, model and serial number) of registered guns belonging to licensed firearms owners. Hicks told the Ontario Federation of Anglers and Hunters (OFAH) that "During my tenure as the CFC webmaster I duly informed management that the website that interfaced to the firearms registry was flawed. It took some $15 million to develop and I broke inside into it within 30 minutes."

The Ontario Federation of Anglers and Hunters questioned the security of the gun registry after a home invasion that seemed to target a licensed gun collector. The OFAH argued that, in the wrong hands, a database detailing the whereabouts of every legally-owned firearm in Canada is a potential shopping list for criminals.

In response to these privacy and security claims, the Canadian Association of Chiefs of Police, the Canadian Police Association, and the Canadian Association of Police Boards released a joint statement claiming that, "The CFP's national database has never been breached by hackers. Information is safe and secure."

== Usage ==
The RCMP Canadian Firearms Program produces a quarterly report called Facts and Figures. The information most often quoted in the media is the total number of queries, in the section entitled Average Daily Queries to the CFRO (Canadian Firearms Registry On-line). This number is what is commonly used to determine how often the registry is accessed by police officers. Changes to the system and the level of automation have resulted in the total number of queries increasing dramatically since the RCMP began tracking these numbers in 2003.

- 2003 – 1,813;
- 2004 – 2,087;
- 2005 – 4,101;
- 2006 – 6,650;
- 2007 – 7,109;
- 2008 – 9,606;
- 2009 – 11,347;
- 2010 – 14,729;
- 2011 – 17,782;
- 2012 – 18,555

As of June 2010, the CFRO is reportedly accessed 14,012 times per day. Only 530 (3.7%) of those "hits" are specific to firearms registration (licence number, serial number and certificate number). The remaining 13,482 (96.3%) are automatically generated every time an address is checked or a licence plate is verified. Officers claim that these automatic checks are valuable to them since they now know if the person or address whom they are researching has registered firearms and where they are. Officers claim that they feel safer knowing about present firearms when addressing a call, specifically in rural regions with domestic violence calls.

While there is reliable information to suggest how many times per day police officers access the firearms registry, the mostly non-automatic inclusion of this information in vehicle and address reports, whereby police must specifically request the information, is considered by many to be a valuable policing tool.

== Current status ==
The Conservative minority government that was elected in both 2006 and 2008 had a platform calling for a repeal of portions of the registry, but did not successfully alter legislation on the registry. However, the government brought forward regulatory changes to bring in an amnesty for rifle and shotgun owners facing prosecution for failing to register their firearms. The government extended this one-year amnesty four times, with the most recent amnesty having expired on May 16, 2011.

In 2009, the Conservative government supported a Private Member's Bill (C-391) which proposed to repeal the portion of the requirement requiring the registration of non-restricted firearms, but would have continued the registration requirement for guns classified as restricted. Despite every other party leader in the House of Commons opposing the bill, Bill C-391 passed second reading in the House of Commons in November 2009 by a vote of 164 to 137 due to eight Liberal MPs, 12 New Democrats and one independent voting with the minority Conservative government.

In response to Liberal MPs breaking party ranks to support Bill C-391, Liberal Opposition Leader Michael Ignatieff announced on April 19, 2010, that Liberal MPs would be whipped to vote against C-391 and other proposals by the Conservative government to kill the long-gun (non-restricted) portion of the registry, with the condition that the party will instead support a reduction in the severity of penalties for those who fail to successfully register. The NDP did not enforce a party stance on parliamentary votes regarding the registry in relation to Bill C-391, as it was a Private Member's Bill. A third reading on September 22, 2010, failed to pass by a narrow margin (153 to 151). Six NDP MPs and the Conservative caucus favoured the bill, while the remaining NDP MPs, the Liberal Party and the Bloc Québécois opposed it.

The Conservatives won a majority in the 2011 election; during the campaign, party leader Stephen Harper reiterated his party's support for eliminating registration of non-restricted long guns.

On October 25, 2011, the government introduced Bill C-19, legislation to remove the requirement to register non-restricted firearms. The bill additionally mandated the destruction of all records pertaining to the registration of non-restricted firearms currently contained in the Canadian Firearms Registry and under the control of the chief firearms officers. The bill passed second reading in the House of Commons (156 to 123). On February 15, 2012, Bill C-19 was passed in the House of Commons (159 to 130) with support from the Conservatives and two NDP MPs. On April 4, 2012, Bill C-19 passed third reading in the Senate by a vote of 50–27 and received royal assent from the Governor General on April 5.

Upon passage of Bill C-19, the Province of Quebec moved for a motion to prevent the destruction of the Quebec portion of the records. A temporary injunction was granted on April 5, 2012 in order to leave enough time for proper legal arguments to be heard. On March 27, 2015, the Supreme Court ruled against Quebec, allowing the destruction of the long-gun registry records.

On September 8, 2014, an appeal by the Barbra Schlifer Clinic to the Ontario Superior Court of Justice to rule that the withdrawal of the non-restricted firearms registration requirement was unconstitutional was denied. The applicants sought to show that the removal of the registration requirement denied women their rights under the Charter of Rights and Freedoms to: "life, liberty and security of the person". In its judgment the court ruled that there was not sufficient evidence to conclude that the registration of non-restricted firearms had been of any measurable benefit to women and that statistically rates of firearms-related violence had been following a trend downward before the requirement was introduced and had not changed after the requirement had been withdrawn.

== See also ==
- Gun politics in Canada
- Possession and Acquisition Licence
- Dominion of Canada Rifle Association
