= Quebec (AG) v Canada (AG) =

- Supreme Court of Canada

Hearing: 8 October 2014 Judgment: 27 March 2015
- Full case name: Attorney General of Quebec v Attorney General of Canada, Commissioner of Firearms and Registrar of Firearms
- Citations: 2015 SCC 14
- Docket No.: 35448
- Prior history: APPEAL from Canada (Procureur général) v Québec (Procureur général), 2013 QCCA 1138
- Ruling: Appeal dismissed.

Court membership
- Chief Justice: Beverley McLachlin; Puisne Justices: Rosalie Abella, Marshall Rothstein, Thomas Cromwell, Michael Moldaver, Andromache Karakatsanis, Richard Wagner, Clément Gascon

Reasons given
- Majority: Cromwell and Karakatsanis JJ, joined by McLachlin CJ and Rothstein and Moldaver JJ
- Dissent: LeBel, Wagner and Gascon JJ, joined by Abella J

Quebec (AG) v Canada (AG), 2015 SCC 14 is a Canadian constitutional law case concerning the federal government's ability to destroy information related to the Canadian long-gun registry pursuant to the federal criminal law power.

== Background ==
In 1995, Parliament passed the Firearms Act, which required long gun owners to register their guns. The Supreme Court found that the Act was within the federal criminal law power. In 2012, Parliament repealed the requirement to register long guns through the Ending the Long-gun Registry Act (ELRA) and sought to delete the information in its registry. The province of Quebec, wishing to create and maintain its own long gun registry, requested that the federal government share the data it had collected about Quebec long gun owners. When the federal government declined to share the information, Quebec argued that section 29 of the ELRA, the provision disbanding the long gun registry, was beyond the powers of the federal government.

At trial in the Superior Court of Quebec, the trial judge found that section 29 was unconstitutional as it violated the principle of cooperative federalism given that Quebec had taken part in "gathering, analyzing, organizing, and modifying" the data in question. The trial judge required the federal government to share the information with Quebec.

Upon appeal to the Court of Appeal of Quebec, Hesler CJQ, writing for a unanimous court, allowed the appeal, holding that since the federal government had the power to create the firearm registry per the Reference re Firearms Act, they would also have the power to dismantle it.

== Reasons of the SCC ==
The Supreme Court was sharply divided on the matter. A five-justice majority found that section 29 of the ELRA was intra vires the federal government, while the four dissenting judges would have found it unconstitutional.

=== Majority ===
The majority, led by Cromwell and Karakatsanis JJ, held that cooperative federalism could not prevent the federal government from unilaterally destroying the registry, since cooperative federalism "cannot be seen as imposing limits on the otherwise valid exercise of legislative competence". Cromwell and Karakatsanis JJ pointed to the possibility that cooperative federalism might work against parliamentary sovereignty and might unduly complicate situations where one level of government's policy choices affect the other's.

Cromwell and Karakatsanis JJ held that Quebec "has not established a legal basis for its claim to the data", finding that Quebec's expectation of continued access to the federal government's database and that Quebec was statutorily limited to licensing data, not registration data.

Cromwell and Karakatsanis JJ then considered whether section 29 of the ELRA was ultra vires the federal government's criminal law power. They characterized section 29 as determining "what will happen to the data collected under the now repealed scheme, a scheme that the Court previously characterized as being in relation to public safety". They held that the fact that section 29 might hinder Quebec's efforts to create their own registry was insufficient to make out colourable legislation. They clarified the pith and substance analysis by specifying that a legislative provision repealing a criminal offence would fall within the scope of the criminal law power, even though it is not strictly a law applying a prohibition and penalty for a public purpose. Classifying the provision itself, Cromwell and Karakatsanis JJ found that it also fell within the federal criminal law power, since "The power to repeal a criminal law provision must logically be wide enough to give Parliament jurisdiction to destroy the data collected for the purpose of a criminal law provision".

=== Minority ===
The minority, composed of LeBel, Wagner, Abella, and Gascon JJ, found that section 29 of the ELRA was unconstitutional as it did not give Quebec, which the minority considered to be in a partnership with the federal government, the opportunity to gain access to the registry data. However, the minority did not order the government to transfer the data to Quebec.

The dissenting judges looked to the legislative history of the Firearms Act, including comments made in the House of Commons that noted the high degree of provincial involvement in the scheme. The dissenting judges considered three issues in order to determine whether section 29 of the ELRA was ultra vires the federal government:

1. the constitutionality of the Firearms Act was upheld by the Supreme Court in the Reference re Firearms Act since it did not "upset the balance of federalism";
2. the data in the registry was interrelated, meaning that the "issuance of registration certificates... depends directly on the work done by Quebec". Thus the dissenting judges found that Quebec and the federal government had formed a partnership with respect to the gun registry due to that interrelation, even though Quebec did not directly enter all the information into the database. Further, Quebec used the registry information for valid provincial legislative purposes;
3. the pith and substance analysis and the ancillary doctrine allow for overlapping powers which "enable the goal of federalism to be realized", and the ELRA, which ends the registry partnership between Quebec and Canada, must comply with those principles:

[154] In other words, a co-operative scheme from which both the federal and provincial governments benefit cannot be dismantled unilaterally by one of the parties without taking the effect of such a decision on its partner’s heads of power into account. To conclude otherwise would be to accept a one-way form of co-operative federalism. That would upset the balance between, on the one hand, the principle of co-operative federalism—which permits a government at one level to pass laws that affect the powers of the other level—and, on the other hand, the doctrine of interjurisdictional immunity—which is inherent in the principle of federalism.

The dissenting judges found that the pith and substance of the impugned provision was to hinder any provincial attempt to use the long-gun registry data, which falls primarily into the provincial property and civil rights power. The dissenting judges undertook an ancillary doctrine analysis, finding that section 29 of the ELRA encroached significantly on provincial powers, since it "compromise[s] the creation and the usefulness of a future Quebec firearms registry", and that such an encroachment was not necessary or integral to the overall legislative scheme. The dissenting judges thus would have found section 29 of the ELRA unconstitutional, since it amounted to unilateral federal destruction of the registry data without first offering it to the provinces, and would have declared it invalid.

However, the dissenting judges noted that "[t]he absence of a legal barrier to the transfer of the data does not necessarily mean that Quebec has proven that it is entitled to obtain them through the courts" and held that Quebec had not proven that it was entitled to the data. The dissenting judges would have allowed the federal and Quebec governments to instead negotiate their own agreement as to data destruction and termination of the partnership.

== Impact ==
Reactions to the Supreme Court's decision in Quebec (AG) v Canada (AG) were mixed. Constitutional law professor Jean Leclair, writing for La Presse, argued that the majority's decision "weakens the principle of cooperative federalism". Sean Fine of The Globe and Mail noted that, out of the four dissenting judges, three: LeBel, Wagner and Gascon JJ, were all from Quebec, pointing to a "divide between the Conservative government and many Quebeckers".

In the wake of the Supreme Court's decision, Quebec public security minister Lise Thériault announced that Quebec would nonetheless create its own gun registry.
