= Authorization to transport =

Canadian firearms transportation permit

An authorization to transport (ATT) is a permit issued by the Royal Canadian Mounted Police (RCMP) under the Canadian Firearms Program allowing transportation of restricted or prohibited firearms in Canada. ATT permits are granted by a chief firearms officer (CFO), who represents the Canadian Firearms Program provincially. Individuals who bear a possession and acquisition licence (PAL) do not need an ATT for the transportation of non-restricted firearms. However, an ATT is required for transporting restricted or prohibited firearms to locations other than an approved shooting range, a gunsmith, a gun show, or a port of entry.

In order to transport a restricted or prohibited firearm it must be unloaded. It also must have a functional trigger lock and be kept in a locked opaque case. Ammunition may be carried with the firearm or separately stored, provided it is not loaded in the gun (i.e., magazines may contain ammunition, but may not be loaded in the firearm).

== Storage conditions ==
The transportation regulations are broken down into two divisions: those for non-restricted firearms and those for restricted or prohibited firearms. These rules are laid out by the Department of Justice. A non-restricted firearm may be transported so long as it is unloaded. Such a firearm does not need to be encased or trigger locked.

A restricted or prohibited-class firearm must be disabled by use of a trigger, cable, or other locking device and locked in an opaque case. An unattended non-restricted firearm left in a vehicle must be locked in the trunk or other compartment, if one is available.

== Non-resident firearms declaration ==
Non-residents of Canada do not require a ATT to import or transfer a non-restricted firearm into Canada; however, all firearms must be declared at a port of entry to the Canada Border Services Agency. Non-residents of Canada are also required to fill out non-resident firearms declaration form, which can be procured at the port of entry. Non-residents of Canada who possess a restricted or prohibited firearm are required to possess an ATT permit before arriving at a port of entry.

== See also ==
- Authorization to carry
