= Canadian Firearms Program =

Canadian government program

- Programme canadien des armes à feu (French)
- Heraldic badge of the RCMP

Agency overview
- Formed: 2008
- Preceding agency: Canada Firearms Centre
- Jurisdiction: Firearm Registration and Licensing
- Headquarters: Ottawa, Ontario, Canada
- Annual budget: $84 million
- Minister responsible: Gary Anandasangaree, Minister of Public Safety
- Agency executives: Michael Duheme, Commissioner of Firearms; Bryan Larkin, Deputy Commissioner, Specialized Policing Services
- Parent agency: Royal Canadian Mounted Police
- Website: Canadian Firearms Program

Canadian Firearms Program (CFP; French: Programme canadien des armes à feu), formerly Canada Firearms Centre is a Canadian government program within the Royal Canadian Mounted Police Policing Support Services, responsible for licensing and regulating firearms in Canada.

As of December 31, 2024, the Canadian Firearms Program recorded a total of 2,412,122 valid firearms licences, which is roughly 5.8% of the Canadian population. The four provinces with the highest number of issued licences are, in order, Ontario, Quebec, Alberta and British Columbia. The provinces and territories with the highest rate of licensing are Yukon (18.8%), Newfoundland and Labrador (13.9%), Northwest Territories (13.3%) and Saskatchewan (9.8%).

== History ==
Bill C-68: An Act Respecting Firearms and Other Weapons was assented in 1995, two years after the bill was introduced by the government to the House of Commons in targeting firearms licensing and registration. CFC was officially created and began operation in 1996 to oversee the administration of the Firearms Act and the Canadian Firearms Program.

On May 17, 2006, responsibility for the Canadian Firearms Program was transferred from the Ministry of Public Safety to the RCMP.

On September 4, 2008, the Canada Firearms Centre and the Firearms Support Services Directorate of RCMP was merged to create the Canadian Firearms Program.

CFP celebrated the 10th anniversary of the opening of the Central Processing Site in Miramichi, New Brunswick, in 2008.

== Organization ==
Under the Constitution of Canada, the federal government has the power to regulate firearm ownership under the criminal law power (See Supreme Court of Canada, Reference re Firearms Act). Despite this, each province is free to opt in to operate the program and its regulations – Ontario, Quebec, Prince Edward Island, New Brunswick and Nova Scotia have chosen to opt in and British Columbia is contemplating the idea. However, the CFP continues to be the central data-processing site and is responsible for the physical issuance of possession and acquisition licences in all cases. Those who chose to opt in would have all the administrative fees reimbursed by the federal government per section 95 of the Firearms Act.

=== Federal ===
CFP is a program within the Royal Canadian Mounted Police. The chain of command is as follows:

The Commissioner of the RCMP serves as the Commissioner of Firearms, the chief executive of the program. The Commissioner is assisted by Deputy Commissioner, Specialized Policing Services. They are responsible to the Minister of Public Safety Canada and thus accountable to the Parliament of Canada.

An RCMP officer of assistant commissioner rank is appointed as the Director General to oversee the day-to-day administration of the CFP.

A Registrar of Firearms is appointed to issue and revoke firearms registration certificates and carriers' licences and maintain the records on Canadian Firearms Registry. The Registrar is also responsible for administering the Public Agents Firearms Regulations.

There are four major areas within the CFP, which are managed by the Deputy Commissioner, Policing Support Services:

- Firearms Administration Centre (for licensing, registration, customer service and operations);
- Firearms Investigative and Enforcement Services Directorate (who assist police in countering illegal movement and criminal use of firearms);
- Strategic Integration and Program Management Services (program support policy, research and planning, business management);
- Partnership and Outreach (communications, client/partner and stakeholder relationship)

The CFP offers a wide variety of investigative support services to police:

- Firearms Reference Table (FRT), a comprehensive firearms database with over 130,000 entries, which establishes a systematic, standard method of identifying, describing and classifying firearms.
- Firearms Identification, for questionable firearms
- Firearms Analysis, for potential evidence in crimes
- Tracing of illicit firearms, the CNFTC (Canadian National Firearm Tracing Centre) assists police in tracing illegal firearms
- Investigational support and assistance, helps police in preparing, obtaining and executing search warrants, location search and seizure, exhibit identification and organisation and court preparation
- Expert firearms advice and witness, provides firearm-related guidance for testimony and court preparation, and act as liaison with partner agencies that can provide these services
- Firearm Case Law Database, firearm-related cases can be researched, and are distributed to investigators
- Crown Attorney Program, working with crown attorney offices, a network that specializes in firearms investigations
- Firearms Operations and Enforcement Support (FOES), intelligence support to firearm investigators and research that identifies trends and patterns in the criminal use of firearms in Canada.
- Pricing of illicit firearms, a record of firearm "street prices" is maintained and the information is made available to investigators
- Access to specialized firearms information databases, Canadian Firearm Information System (CFIS), Canadian Integrated Ballistic Identification Network (CIBIN) and the Suspect Gun Database
- Training, lectures, conferences, outreach and learning material available across Canada are available on a broad range of topics involving firearms
- Firearms registration information, querying records contained within the Canadian Firearms Registry Online (CFRO)
- Public Agent Firearms Reporting assistance, helping public agents use the Public Agency Web Services (PWS) to report agency and protected firearms and assisting public agents understand their obligations under the (Public Agents Firearms Regulations)

=== Provincial/Territorial ===
Each province has its own chief firearms officer (CFO), appointed either by the government of Canada or by the executive council of the province. Alberta, Saskatchewan, Ontario, Quebec, New Brunswick and Nova Scotia opted to appoint their own provincial chief firearms officer. Two of the three territories share a CFO with another province (British Columbia with Yukon and Manitoba with Nunavut). Northwest Territories have its own CFO since Alberta decided to appoint their own provincial CFO. They are responsible for making decisions (grant, deny, revoke or put conditions) on licensing (i.e. possession and acquisition licence), authorization to transport, authorization to carry and transfer of firearms along with all of its administrative work.

Each province also appoints firearms officers (generally speaking, police officers or RCMP civilian members) to inspect and ensure compliance within the definition of the Firearms Act. They may apply to court for a preventive prohibition order if it is in the public's interest that a person should not be in possession of any weapons regulated under the Firearms Act. In carrying out their duties, they can demand firearms be presented to them and samples to be taken. Failure to comply is a summary offence which may lead to complications when one is up to renew his or her firearms licence for previous contravention of the Firearms Act.

== See also ==
- Dominion of Canada Rifle Association
- Firearms regulation in Canada
