= Gun registry =

Government record of firearms and owners

A gun registry is a government record of firearms and their owners. Not all jurisdictions require gun registration.

== United States ==
In the United States, there is currently no national gun registry, though there is a National Instant Criminal Background Check System (NICS) that prevents firearm sales to people prohibited under the Brady Handgun Violence Prevention Act. Some states such as Hawaii, have provided the federal government with information on gun owners, and states such as California require a person to register a gun if it falls under a certain class, such as an assault weapon. At the federal level, legislation has been introduced to criminalize creation of a gun registry.

== Canada ==
Firearms classified as restricted (most handguns) and prohibited are required to be registered with the Canadian Firearms Program, and the individual requires a restricted (RPAL) and/or prohibited class firearms licence to own and transfer the firearm.

== Australia ==
Under gun laws of Australia, a person is required to have a firearm licence to possess or use a firearm. Licence holders must demonstrate a "genuine reason" (which does not include self-defence) for holding a firearm licence and must not be a "prohibited person". All firearms must be registered by serial number to the owner, who must also hold a firearms licence.

== New Zealand ==
New Zealand started its Firearms Registry on 24 June 2023. It is administered by Te Tari Pūreke Firearms Safety Authority, a branch of New Zealand Police.
