= Dominion of Canada Rifle Association =

Organization founded to promote and encourage marksmanship training throughout Canada

- Dominion of Canada Rifle Association Logo
- Formation: April 1, 1868
- Type: Shooting organization
- Headquarters: Ottawa, Ontario
- Official language: English
- Affiliations: International Confederation of Fullbore Rifle Associations (ICFRA)
- Website: www.dcra.ca

The Dominion of Canada Rifle Association (DCRA; French: Association de Tir Dominion du Canada) is a Canadian shooting sports organization governing fullbore target rifle disciplines. The Association was founded in 1868 and incorporated by an Act of Parliament 63-64 Victoria Chapter 99, assented to July 7, 1900, to promote and encourage the training of marksmanship throughout Canada.

The DCRA is a member of the International Confederation of Fullbore Rifle Associations and sends teams to World Championships every four years. As of 2022, DCRA teams had won the Palma Trophy four times for Canada - in 1901; 1967; 1972 and 1982.

== History ==
On April 1, 1868, Adjutant General of the Militia General MacDougall called a meeting in Ottawa, where it was decided to form the Dominion of Canada Rifle Association, bringing together thirty three disparate associations. The Association was Patronised by Sir John Young, the Governor General of Canada, and Casimir Gzowski served as the first President.

The first Annual Prize Meeting was held just outside Montreal. In excess of 900 competitors turned up to compete for $5,500 in prize money (equivalent to nearly $200,000 in 2022). The DCRA has continued to hold prize meetings every year since, except during the two World Wars. The Rideau Range near Ottawa served as the national range until 1897. In 1898 the Meeting moved to Rockcliffe, which permitted shooting from 200 to 1000 yards with room for extension back to 2000.

The DCRA erected a plaque in 1906 at St. Andrew's Presbyterian Church in Ottawa which is dedicated to Lt Colonel John MacPherson (1830-1906), who served as its treasurer for 36 years. In 1921, the Association moved again to Connaught Ranges, which they were granted the use of in perpetuity. The DCRA erected a memorial plaque at the DCRA building at the Connaught Ranges (Shirley's Bay) which is dedicated in memory of the members of the DCRA who gave their lives in World War II.

=== Macdonald Stewart Pavilion ===
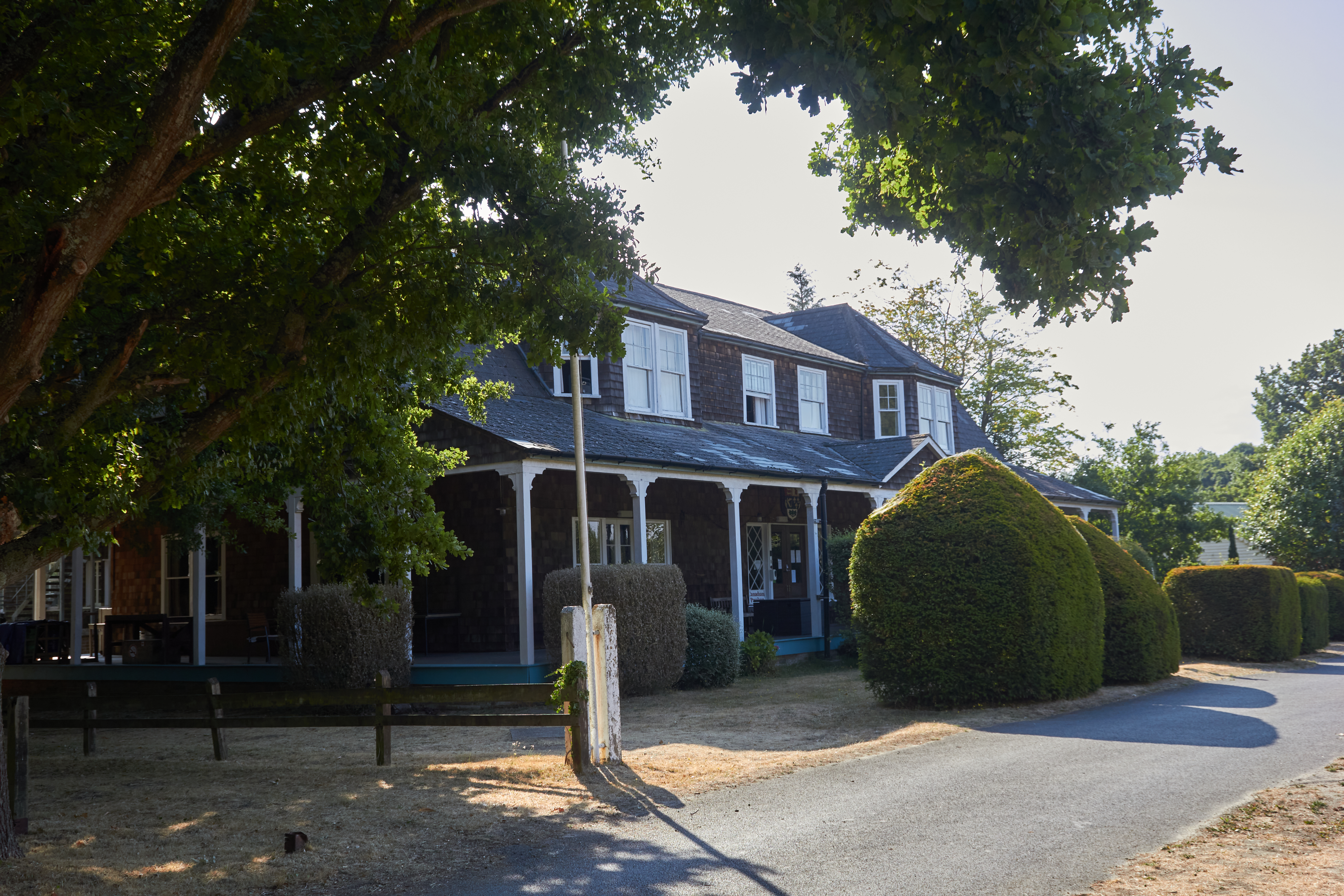
Canada House, National Shooting Centre, England

In 1896, the DCRA ran a competition for the construction of a pavilion on Bisley Camp. This was to serve as a residence for the Canadian national team when competing at the UK National Rifle Association's annual Imperial Meeting, to which the DCRA have sent teams since at least 1871 The contract was awarded to the firm of C J Saxe and R M Rodden of Montreal, who completed "the Macdonald Stewart Pavilion" in 1897 (more often known at Bisley as "Canada House"). Aside from providing a comfortable accommodation for the team, the specification called for extensive use of Canadian woods, demonstrating the versatility of the materials to all visitors. In 2003 the building became Grade-II listed by Historic England and has since been used as a filming location for Netflix series The Crown, as a stand-in for period locations in North America.

== Provincial rifle associations ==
The provincial rifle associations are:

- Alberta Rifle Association
- British Columbia Rifle Association
- Manitoba Provincial Rifle Association
- Nova Scotia Rifle Association
- Ontario Rifle Association
- Prince Edward Island Rifle Association
- Province of Quebec Rifle Association
- Royal New Brunswick Rifle Association
- Saskatchewan Rifle Association
- National Capital Region Rifle Association

== See also ==
Canada

- Canadian Firearms Program
- Canadian Firearms Registry
- Gun politics in Canada
- Possession and Acquisition Licence

International

- International Confederation of Fullbore Rifle Associations
- United States: National Rifle Association of America
- Australia: National Rifle Association of Australia
- New Zealand: National Rifle Association of New Zealand
- United Kingdom: National Rifle Association
