= Firearms regulation in Canada =

Laws regarding firearms in Canada

Firearms are federally regulated in Canada through the Firearms Act, the Criminal Code, and the Canadian Firearms Program, a program operated within the Royal Canadian Mounted Police. Regulation is largely about licensing and registration of firearms, including air guns with a muzzle velocity of more than 500 ft/s or 150 m/s and muzzle energy greater than 4.2 ft⋅lb or 5.7 J.

Civilian ownership and use is legal after obtaining a possession and acquisition licence (PAL) or a restricted possession and acquisition licence (RPAL) issued by the RCMP. An RPAL is required for handguns and short-barrelled semi-automatic rifles. For PALs there are generally no justification requirements beyond not posing a risk to public safety; RPALs require either gun club membership, demonstration of sufficient firearms knowledge, or a professional carry authorization. However, firearms and licence holders are subject to heavy regulations, and there are many types of firearms that are classed as prohibited.

Concealed carry is prohibited outside of a lawful profession (e.g. security and trapping). Open carry of non-restricted rifles is federally permitted when adhering to transport regulations. Hunting with a restricted firearm (which includes handguns) is prohibited.

Handgun registration became law in 1934, and automatic firearms registration was added in 1951. In 1969, laws classified firearms as "non-restricted", "restricted", and "prohibited". Starting in 1979, people who wished to acquire firearms were required to obtain a firearms acquisition certificate (FAC) from their local police agency. From 1995 to present, all firearms owners are required to possess a firearms licence—either a PAL, a possession-only licence (POL), an FAC, or a minor's licence. In April 2012, the Parliament of Canada enacted the Ending the Long-gun Registry Act to eliminate the requirement to register non-restricted firearms that had existed from 2001 to 2012.

A 1996 study showed that Canada was in the mid-range of firearm ownership when compared with eight other western nations. Nearly 22% of Canadian households had at least one firearm, including 2.3% of households possessing a handgun. In 2005, almost 3% of households in Canada possessed handguns, compared to 18% of U.S. households that possessed handguns. Also in 2005, almost 16% of households in Canada possessed firearms of some kind. As of September 2010, the Canadian Firearms Program recorded a total of 1,831,327 valid firearm licences, which is roughly 5.4% of the Canadian population. The four most licensed provinces are Ontario, Quebec, Alberta, and British Columbia.

On May 1, 2020, in the wake of a mass killing in Nova Scotia, Prime Minister Justin Trudeau announced an immediate prohibition on around 1,500 models of "military-grade assault-style weapons", mostly semi-automatic rifles, via an order in council under the authority of the Criminal Code. This list was expanded in December 2024, adding over 300 more models as prohibited. On October 21, 2022, the Government of Canada implemented a freeze on the sale and transfer of handguns with plans to introduce a gun buyback program. As of January 2025, the buyback program has not yet started, reportedly due to Canada Post having concerns about employee security.

== History of firearm laws ==
In Canada, controls on civilian use of firearms date from the early days of Confederation, when justices of the peace could impose penalties for carrying a handgun without reasonable cause. Amendments to the Criminal Code between the 1890s and the 1970s introduced a series of controls on firearms, including registration of handguns, and later, registration of fully automatic firearms. In the late 1970s, additional controls were introduced, followed by additional increases in controls in the mid-1990s.

The following is a summary of the history of gun control laws in Canada:

=== 1885–1968 ===
- The Parliament instituted a system of gun control in the North-West Territories in 1885 to hinder the North-West Rebellion. Permission in writing from the territorial government was needed to possess any firearm (other than a smooth-bore shotgun), and also ammunition. Possession of a firearm or ammunition without the necessary permit was an offence, and could lead to the forfeiture of the firearm and ammunition. These gun control provisions applied to all of what is now Alberta, Saskatchewan, parts of Manitoba, the current Northwest Territories, Yukon, and Nunavut.
- The Criminal Code, enacted in 1892, required individuals to have a permit to carry a pistol unless the owner had cause to fear assault or injury. Not until 1935 was it considered an offence to sell a pistol to anyone under 16. Vendors who sold handguns had to keep records, including purchaser's name, the date of sale and a description of the gun.
- In the 1920s, permits became necessary for all firearms newly acquired by foreigners.
- Legislation in 1934 required the registration of handguns with records identifying the owner, the owner's address and the firearm. Registration certificates were issued and records kept by the commissioner of the Royal Canadian Mounted Police (RCMP) or by other police forces designated by provincial attorneys general.
- In 1947, the definition of murder in the Criminal Code was expanded to include situations where an individual committed certain offences such as rape, robbery, burglary, or arson while armed with a weapon, and death ensued, whether or not the accused intended to cause death. This offence was struck down as unconstitutional by the Supreme Court in 1987 in the case of R. v. Vaillancourt.
- Automatic firearms were added to the category of firearms that had to be registered in 1951. The registry system was centralized under the commissioner of the RCMP.

=== 1969–2000 ===
- In 1969, Bill C-150 created categories of "non-restricted", "restricted" and "prohibited" firearms. Police were also given preventive powers of search and seizure by judicial warrant if they had grounds to believe that firearms that belonged to an individual endangered the safety of society.
- In 1977, Bill C-51 required firearms acquisition certificates (FACs) to purchase any firearm, and introduced controls on the selling of ammunition. Applicants were required to pass a basic criminal record check before receiving the FAC. Fully automatic firearms were reclassified from restricted to prohibited-class, with an exception for current owners (grandfathering).
- The 1989 École Polytechnique massacre spurred a movement for stronger gun control in Canada, led by PolySeSouvient.
- In 1991, Bill C-17 was introduced, coming into force between 1992 and 1994. It required FAC applicants to pass a safety course in addition to a thorough background check, and to wait a minimum of 28 days after applying before an FAC could be issued. It also created new Criminal Code offences, new definitions for prohibited and restricted weapons, and new regulations for firearms dealers. It increased penalties for firearm-related crimes. It clearly outlined regulations for firearms storage, handling and transportation.
- A major focus of C-17 was the control of military and paramilitary firearms. It created orders prohibiting or restricting most paramilitary rifles and some types of non-sporting ammunition. It prohibited firearms that had been converted to avoid a 1978 prohibition (exempting existing owners), and it prohibited high-capacity magazines for automatic and semi-automatic firearms. (It limited handguns to ten rounds and most semi-automatic centre-fire rifles to five rounds.)
- In 1995, Bill C-68 enacted the Firearms Act, with related amendments to the Criminal Code. It implemented a new central licensing system to replace the FAC system. It also required registration of all firearms and firearm licence holders; banned short-barrelled handguns under 105 mm in length, in addition to banning .25 and .32-calibre handguns with "grandfathering" for previous owners; and required a licence to buy ammunition. Most of the bill's provisions came into force in 1998, and the registration of long guns became mandatory in 2003.
- The legislation was upheld by the Supreme Court in Reference re Firearms Act (2000). The FAC system was replaced with possession-only licences (POLs) and possession and acquisition licences (PALs).

=== 2001–2019 ===
- In 2001, the registration portion of Bill C-68 was implemented. The government asked for all firearms, including long guns (rifles and shotguns), to be registered.
- In 2003, the registration of long guns became mandatory. Failure to register a firearm resulted in criminal charges.
- In 2006, although legislation was still in place, the government no longer asked long gun owners for a registration fee and an amnesty (until May 16, 2011) temporarily protected licensed owners of non-restricted firearms (or those whose licences had expired since January 1, 2004) from prosecution for the possession of unregistered long guns.
- In November 2009, Bill C-391 passed second reading in the House of Commons by a vote of 164 to 137. If passed through the entire parliamentary process by the House and Senate, the bill would have abolished the requirement to register non-restricted long guns. While the proposed legislation was a private member's bill, it had the support of the Conservative government. The bill was referred to the House of Commons Committee on Public Safety for further action. However, after several months of hearings, the Opposition majority on the committee recommended that no further action be taken to advance the bill. In September 2010, Bill C-391 failed to pass a third reading.
- On October 25, 2011, Public Safety Minister Vic Toews introduced a bill to amend the Criminal Code and the Firearms Act, to abolish the long gun registry and destroy all records.
- On February 15, 2012, Bill C-19 passed third reading in the House of Commons; the motion to abolish the long gun registry passed 159 to 130 and Bill C-19 became law.
- In October 2014, Public Safety Minister Stephen Blaney and the Conservatives introduced another bill, Bill C-42, also known as the Common Sense Firearms Licensing Act. This legislation reduced required paperwork for the transportation of restricted firearms, held by licensed firearms owners, for certain lawful activities (such as transportation to a shooting range and to gunsmiths or gun shows). It lifted the ban on the Swiss Arms Classic Green Carbine, introduced a six-month "grace period" for firearms licence renewals before an individual might otherwise face criminal charges and abolished the possession-only licence, permitting holders of such licences to enjoy the same full acquisition privileges as a PAL holders. The legislation also implemented mandatory training for all first-time firearms licence applicants. This legislation was passed and enacted in 2015, but the new Liberal government, formed in November 2015, pledged to reverse some of its provisions.
- On June 21, 2019, Bill C-71, An Act to Amend certain Acts and Regulations in relation to firearms received Royal Assent. The new legislation extended background checks from five years to a lifetime, implemented a point-of-sale registration by business, required authorization to transport restricted and prohibited firearms to locations other than the range (e.g. gunsmiths, gun shows, etc.) through strengthened transportation requirements; and, safeguard the impartial classification of firearms by putting the responsibility in the hands of technical experts, who make these determinations based on the Criminal Code, among others.

=== 2020–present ===
Prime Minister Justin Trudeau's remarks announcing a ban on "assault-style" firearms

- In the wake of the 2020 Nova Scotia attacks, Prime Minister Justin Trudeau announced on May 1, 2020, that 1,500 models of a newly coined category called "assault-style" weapons, largely semi-automatic long guns, would be classified as prohibited effective immediately. However, the term assault style is not defined in Canadian law, and is based on RCMP classification opinions. The law granted a two-year amnesty period and provided owners with various methods to dispose, register or participate in a buyback scheme. Six weeks before the amnesty order was to come into effect the deadline was extended until October 30, 2023, so that officials could plan the buyback program, and allow owners and businesses to remain in compliance with the law.
- On October 21, 2022, a national freeze on the sale of handguns was put in effect via an order-in-council. New handguns could no longer be bought. Existing ones could continue to be used but could not be transferred. The freeze was later codified into the Firearms Act as part of Bill C-21, which received royal assent in 2023.
- On December 1, 2024, over 300 firearms were reclassified as prohibited. This was implemented on the anniversary of the École Polytechnique massacre. The reclassification included amnesty for existing owners until at least November 2025.
- In autumn 2025 a pilot buyback program was conducted on Cape Breton Island, Nova Scotia. Over 3500 licensed owners of eligible firearms were informed of the program. Instead of receiving the expected 200 firearms, 16 individuals brought in 25 firearms.
- On January 17, 2026, the Minister of Public Safety announced the timeline for owners to declare their firearms which may be eligible for compensation. An internet portal would take information and owners would receive further instructions. The last day in a series of amnesty extensions will be October 31, 2026. As of the date of the announcement only Quebec had agreed to contribute police resources. All other provinces and territories, including major police forces, had declined to join the program.

== Licensing of firearms owners ==
Individual firearms licences, 2019
Jurisdiction	Possession and acquisition licences	Population, 2019	Licences per 100 people
Canada	2,219,344	37,811,399	5.87
Alberta	326,519	4,384,982	7.45
British Columbia	310,193	5,130,251	6.05
Manitoba	93,425	1,374,081	6.80
New Brunswick	70,958	780,631	9.09
Newfoundland and Labrador	77,116	523,847	14.72
Northwest Territories	6,022	45,189	13.33
Nova Scotia	77,017	976,495	7.89
Nunavut	3,859	38,625	9.99
Ontario	628,714	14,638,247	4.29
Prince Edward Island	6,530	158,778	4.11
Quebec	497,862	8,542,198	5.83
Saskatchewan	113,143	1,176,427	9.62
Yukon	7,986	41,648	19.17

All licensing and registration is managed by the RCMP's Canadian Firearms Program (CFP), under the Deputy Commissioner Policing Support Services (PSS). There are three classes of firearms and firearm licences: non-restricted, restricted, and prohibited. Prohibited firearms are not forbidden outright, as the name might imply, but their legal possession and acquisition are dependent upon their registration history and an individual's firearm licence. As of December 1, 1998, the prohibited clause must be grandfathered to acquire or possess prohibited firearms. See Classification of firearms below for complete details on prohibited, restricted and non-restricted firearms.

Individuals who wish to possess or acquire firearms in Canada must have a valid possession-acquisition, or possession-only, licence (PAL/POL); either of these licences allows the licensee to purchase ammunition. The PAL is distributed exclusively by the RCMP and is generally obtained in the following three steps:

1. Safety training: To be eligible to receive a PAL, all applicants must successfully complete the Canadian Firearms Safety Course (CFSC) for a non-restricted licence, and the Canadian Restricted Firearms Safety Course (CRFSC) for a restricted licence (RPAL); the non-restricted class is a prerequisite to the restricted licence. An individual must score 80% or higher to pass the courses. Each province/territory's chief firearms officer publishes information on the locations and availability of these courses.
2. Applying for a licence: Only two types of licences are available to new applicants: the possession-acquisition licence (PAL) and the restricted-class possession-acquisition licence (RPAL). People can request a PAL/RPAL by filling out Form CAFC 921.
3. Security screening: enhanced background check and interviews with current and former conjugal partners, as well as interviews with two references are performed. All applicants are screened, and a mandatory 28-day waiting period is imposed on first-time applicants, but final approval time may be longer.

Licences are typically valid for five years and must be renewed prior to expiry to maintain all classes. Once licensed for restricted firearms (RPAL), an individual can request a firearm transfer for the restricted firearm; and an authorization to transport (ATT) for restricted firearms. People may hunt with firearms in Canada only with non-restricted firearms, and this requires an additional "Hunting with Firearms" course.

== Laws and regulations ==
=== Registration ===
Between January 1, 2001 and April 5, 2012, all firearms in Canada were required to be registered with the Canadian Firearms Registry. Unlike restricted-class firearms, in order to legally own a fully automatic firearm in Canada the prohibited-class firearm needs to not only have a current registration but must also have been registered prior to 1978.

The repeal of the long-gun registry had been a long-standing campaign promise of the Conservative Party. In early 2006, the Conservative Party became the largest party in the House of Commons, and the new government announced an amnesty period of one year (later extended by a further year) in which licensed or previously licensed long-gun owners would not be punished for not registering their long guns. The legal requirement to register as set forth by law was not revoked; legislation to revoke the requirement to register long guns was introduced by the government during the 39th Parliament but was not brought to a vote. It was opposed by the Opposition parties who together had a majority of seats in the House of Commons. Similar legislation was again brought forward in the form of private member's Bill C-391 during the 40th Parliament but was narrowly defeated on September 22, 2010. During the 41st Parliament the newly formed Conservative majority government again introduced legislation to repeal the requirement to register non-restricted firearms and to destroy the registry database. Bill C-19, known as the Ending the Long-gun Registry Act, passed both the House and Senate and received royal assent on April 5, 2012. Following the 2012 changes to the law, Canadians were no longer required to register non-restricted firearms. Further, existing public records kept by the Canadian Firearms Registry with regards to owners of non-restricted firearms were purportedly expunged. The requirement for all firearms owners to possess a valid firearms licence remained law.

Though the Ending the Long-gun Registry Act applied across Canada, implementation of the law was temporarily delayed in Quebec, after the provincial government challenged the repeal in the courts. In 2015, the Supreme Court of Canada ruled against Quebec, entirely eliminating non-restricted registry records. However, the government of Quebec received a partial copy of the deleted federal firearms registry, and created a provincial firearms registry. The government of Quebec gave residents until January 29, 2019, to register non-restricted firearms within the province with the Quebec Firearms Registration Service (SIAF).

Following the 2020 Nova Scotia attacks, the minority Liberal government under Justin Trudeau, announced a nationwide ban on "military style weapons" and "assault-style weapons". Neither of these two classifications had existed previously under Canadian law, but the policy effectively moved around 1500 types of firearms from the restricted and non-restricted categories to the prohibited column alongside automatic long-guns. Though a buyback program is being formulated for these types of weapons, it is not currently expected to be mandatory.

=== Age restrictions and minor's licence ===
By law, a potential customer must be 18 years of age or older to purchase a firearm (non-restricted or restricted) or legally maintain possession of one. Minors 12-17 may procure a minor's licence, which does not allow them to purchase a firearm but allows them to borrow a non-restricted firearm unsupervised and purchase ammunition. Children under the age of 12 that are found to need a non-restricted firearm to hunt or trap may also be awarded the minor's licence. This is generally reserved for children in remote locations, primarily aboriginal communities that engage in subsistence hunting.

=== Legality of self-defence ===
The issue of the legality of self-defence with a firearm in Canada has been the subject of controversy. While self-defence is legal, it is very restricted. Use of force with a firearm is legal as long as a life is in danger and the force used is not excessive. The framework for determining if an act of self-defence is legally justified is laid out in Sections 34 and 35 of the Criminal Code.

Obtaining a PAL for self-defence is possible, as there is no legal justification requirement for obtaining one (provided that the applicant does not pose a risk to themselves or others). However, self-defence being the primary reason for obtaining a PAL is generally discouraged and may arouse suspicion if discovered during the application process. RPALs are issued for self-defence only to those with valid authorization to carry (ATC), which in turn is almost impossible to obtain.

Authorization to carry can be issued for self-defence only if there is credible proof that a person's life is being actively targeted in a way which police cannot provide sufficient protection. This situation is extremely rare: the public RCMP ATC application refers only to protection of life during employment that involves handling of valuable goods or dangerous wildlife.

=== Prohibited devices ===
- Replica firearms (i.e., "any device that is designed or intended to exactly resemble, or to resemble with near precision, a firearm, and that itself is not a firearm, but does not include any such device that is designed or intended to exactly resemble, or to resemble with near precision, an antique firearm")
  - Due to how firearms are defined in statute, airsoft replicas can be legally obtained without a licence if they have a muzzle velocity of greater than 366 ft/s (112 m/s) but less than 500 ft/s (150 m/s), any replicas under 366 ft/s would be considered prohibited unless it is obviously a toy (e.g. made out of clear plastic or at a drastically different scale). A brightly-coloured tip (or the absence of such) has no bearing on its legality. Some provinces restrict the purchase of airsoft replicas to those who are at least 18 years of age.
- Suppressors (i.e., "a device or contrivance designed or intended to reduce the perceived loudness of firearm, typically between 17-24 dB of the initial report (Murphy et.al, 2013)")
- Handgun barrels that are 105 millimetres (4.1 in) and under (excluding barrels of pistols used in international sporting competitions governed by the rules of the International Shooting Union)
- Electrical or mechanical devices designed or adapted to render the trigger mechanism of a semi-automatic firearm to discharge in a fully-automatic fashion
- "Any rifle, shotgun or carbine stock of the type known as the 'bull-pup' design, being a stock that, when combined with a firearm, reduces the overall length of the firearm such that a substantial part of the reloading action or the magazine-well is located behind the trigger of the firearm when it is held in the normal firing position" (i.e., only removable stocks are prohibited by this regulation; fixed-stock firearms such as the FN PS90, Norinco Type 97 and IWI Tavor are excluded).

=== Prohibited ammunition ===
- Handgun ammunition designed to penetrate body armour; for example: KTW and THV round, 5.7 × 28 mm (excluding sporting rounds such as SS196SR and SS197SR).
- Incendiary or explosive ammunition designed for use in or in conjunction with a cartridge and does not exceed 15 mm in diameter.
- Flechette rounds

=== Magazine capacity ===
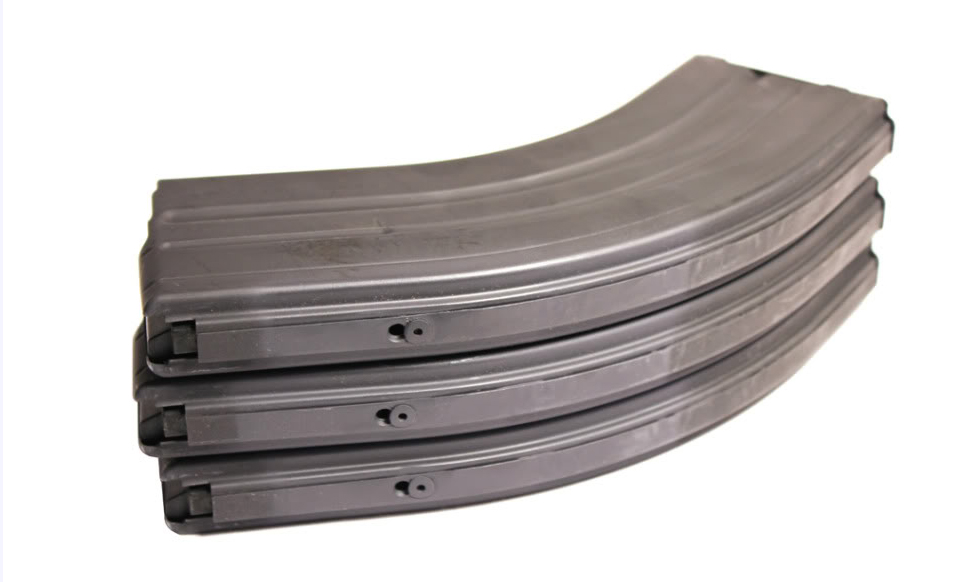
Common AR-15 30 round magazines that have been pinned to 5 rounds

Magazines designed to contain centre-fire cartridges and designed or manufactured for use in a semiautomatic handgun are limited to 10 cartridges. Magazines designed to contain centre-fire cartridges and designed or manufactured for use in a semiautomatic rifle are limited to 5 cartridges. The capacity is measured by the kind of cartridge the magazine was designed to contain. In some cases the magazine is capable of containing more than 10 rounds of a different calibre; however, that is not relevant in the determination of the maximum permitted capacity.

The maximum permitted capacity of a magazine is determined by the kind of firearm it is designed or manufactured for and not the kind of firearm that might actually use it. As a consequence, the maximum permitted capacity remains the same regardless of which firearm it might be used in. Example: The Marlin Camp carbine chambered for .45 ACP uses magazines designed and manufactured for the M1911 pistol, therefore the seven- and eight-round capacities are permitted. A similar example is the 10-round capacity magazine for the Rock River Arms LAR-15 pistol, regardless of the kind of firearm it is actually used in.

Many common magazines are manufactured to hold more rounds than law allows in Canada. These magazines must be permanently altered so they no longer hold more than the number of rounds (5 for semi-auto rifles, 10 for pistols) allowed by law. Acceptable ways to alter a magazine are set out in the Criminal Code regulations.

== Classifications ==
In Canada, firearms are classified into prohibited, restricted and non-restricted categories, as defined by Part III of the Criminal Code. The correct licence is required to acquire and possess the category of firearm (i.e, PAL for non-restricted, RPAL for restricted, Prohib 12.x for prohibited).

=== Prohibited ===
A prohibited firearm requires a prohibited-class (grandfathered) possession and acquisition licence to acquire and possess at a minimum. The licences will indicate which categories the individual or business has been grandfathered into. (12.2, 12.3, 12.4, 12.5, 12.6, 12.7)

- Handguns (12.6)
  - with a barrel length less than 105 millimetres (4.1 in), or;
  - that are designed to discharge .25 or .32 calibre ammunition (subject to exception for international sport competitions);
- Rifles and shotguns that have been altered by sawing, cutting or any other means, so that:
  - the barrel length is less than 457 millimetres (18.0 in) (regardless of overall length), or;
  - the overall length is less than 660 millimetres (26 in)
- Firearms which have fully automatic fire capability (12.2), or "converted automatics" (12.3) (i.e.: firearms which were originally fully automatic, but have been modified to discharge ammunition in a semi-automatic fashion)
- Firearms prescribed as prohibited by the Regulations Prescribing Certain Firearms and other Weapons, Components and Parts of Weapons, Accessories, Cartridge Magazines, Ammunition and Projectiles as Prohibited or Restricted (SOR/98-462):
  - Firearm capable of discharging dart or other object carrying electric current or substance, including Taser Public Defender and any variant or modified version of it
  - Firearm known as SSS-1 Stinger and any similar firearm designed or of a size to fit in the palm of the hand
  - Hundreds of other firearms listed by name, including any variants or modified versions. The list includes shotguns, carbines, rifles, pistols, and submachine guns. This includes all versions (even semi-automatic) of certain military weapons such as the AK-47 and the FN FAL.
- Firearms prescribed as prohibited by the Regulations Amending the Regulations Prescribing Certain Firearms and Other Weapons, Components and Parts of Weapons, Accessories, Cartridge Magazines, Ammunition and Projectiles as Prohibited, Restricted or Non-Restricted (SOR/2020-96)
  - Rifles of the designs commonly known as ArmaLite AR-10, ArmaLite AR-15, M16, M14, Robinson Armament XCR, and SIG SG 550 (including any variants or modified versions)
  - Carbines of the designs commonly known as Beretta Cx4 Storm, CZ Scorpion Evo 3, M4 and SIG SG 551 (including any variants or modified versions)
  - Pistols of the design commonly known as CZ Scorpion EVO 3
  - Firearms with bore diameters of 20 mm or more (despite concerns expressed by some, this does not include 10 gauge and 12 gauge shotguns with removable chokes)
  - Firearms that produce 10,000 joules of energy or more (including .50 BMG calibre rifles)
- A firearm that is not a handgun and that
  - discharges centre-fire ammunition in a semi-automatic manner;
  - was originally designed with a detachable cartridge magazine with a capacity of six cartridges or more; and
  - is designed and manufactured on or after December 15, 2023

=== Restricted ===
Requires a restricted possession and acquisition licence (RPAL) to acquire and possess at a minimum. RPALs may be issued to applicants who meet one or more of the following:

- Being a member of a registered gun club
- Being able to demonstrate sufficient technical, historical or scientific knowledge of firearms one plans on owning as part of a collection
- Having a valid Authorization to Carry:
  - to use a firearm as part of one's lawful profession; or
  - in exceedingly rare cases where one's life is being actively targeted to an extent where police protection is insufficient, and there is credible documentation on such

Canada's federal laws severely restrict the ability of civilians to transport restricted or prohibited (grandfathered) firearms in public. Section 17 of the Firearms Act makes it an offence to possess prohibited or restricted firearms other than at a dwelling-house or authorized location, but there are two exceptions to this prohibition found in sections 19 and 20 of the act. Section 19 allows for persons to be issued an authorization to transport (ATT), authorizing the transport of a firearm outside the home for certain purposes, such as for its transfer to a new owner, going to and from a range, a training course, repair shop or gun show, or when the owner wishes to change the address where the firearm is stored. Such firearms must be transported unloaded, equipped with a trigger lock and stored in secure, locked containers. In rarer cases, section 20 of the act allows individuals to receive an authorization to carry, or ATC, granting permission to carry loaded restricted firearms or (section 12(6)) prohibited handguns on their persons for certain reasons specified in the act. These reasons are as follows: if the person is a licensed trapper and carries the firearm while trapping, if the person is in a remote wilderness area and needs the firearm for protection against wildlife, if the person's work involves guarding or handling money or other items of substantial value, or if the person's life is in imminent danger and police protection is inadequate to protect the person. This is extremely rare, data from FOI requests reveals that only around one or two permits for protection of life are ever active at any given time. The vast majority of ATCs issued are to employees of armoured car companies to allow carry of a company owned firearm only while working. Restrictions are as follows:

- All handguns are restricted firearms at a minimum; some handguns are prohibited firearms (see above).
- Any firearm that is:
  - not prohibited
  - that has a barrel length less than 470 millimetres (18.5 in), and
  - is capable of discharging centre-fire ammunition in a semi-automatic manner.
- Any firearm that can be fired when the overall length has been reduced by folding, telescoping, or other means to less than 660 millimetres (26 in)
- Firearms prescribed as restricted by the Regulations Prescribing Certain Firearms and other Weapons, Components and Parts of Weapons, Accessories, Cartridge Magazines, Ammunition and Projectiles as Prohibited or Restricted (SOR/98-462):
  - The firearms of the designs commonly known as the High Standard Model 10, Series A shotgun and the High Standard Model 10, Series B shotgun, and any variants or modified versions of them.

=== Non-restricted ===
- Firearms, other than those referred to above. Generally, this includes (unless otherwise prescribed by law):
  - Rimfire rifles (manual or semi-automatic)
  - Shotguns (manual, break-action and most self-loading models)
  - Manual centrefire rifles
  - Long-barreled, semi-automatic centrefire rifles which use a non-detactable magazine of five rounds or less (and are not a variant of a prohibited model)
  - Some long-barreled, semi-automatic centrefire rifles which use a detachable magazine (and are not a variant of a prohibited model)
    - Any firearm of this type is automatically classed as prohibited if it uses a detectable box magazine of six or more rounds and is designed after December 15, 2023
    - Most common semi-automatic models of this type are currently prescribed as prohibited by regulation or statute; however, it is still technically possible for a firearm of this type to be non-restricted

=== Antique ===
A category that includes several different categories of firearm designed before 1898, although not all firearms built before this cutoff date are eligible for antique classification. Guns considered antiques are not legally considered firearms, and can be purchased and owned without a PAL. The following types of firearm are classified as antiques if they were both designed and manufactured before 1898:

- All cartridge-firing long arms and handguns chambered in mostly obscure large-calibre rimfire cartridges, such as .32 Rimfire and .44 Henry. Handguns chambered for the former cartridge are considered non-restricted antiques even though .32 is otherwise a prohibited bore for pistols.
- All single-shot cartridge-firing centrefire rifles chambered in calibres of over 8.6 millimetres (0.34 in), and all smoothbore shotgun conversions of such rifles regardless of calibre.
- Rimfire smoothbore shotguns in calibres other than .22.
- Centrefire cartridge handguns chambered in calibres that are no longer widely available, such as .45 Schofield.
- All muzzleloading (black powder) handguns and cap-and-ball revolvers.

The following guns are considered antiques if they were designed before 1898, regardless of manufacture date, making modern replicas free to possess:

- Non-cartridge-firing long guns which use flintlock, wheellock or matchlock ignition mechanisms.

=== Handguns ===
As of 2022, a national freeze was placed on the sale and transfer of handguns. However, this did not change the classification of handguns. Those who owned handguns prior to the freeze may continue to possess and use them in accordance with the law, however they cannot acquire new ones or transfer their existing ones to someone else. One may lawfully export them to another country, but they cannot be imported back in afterwards. Exceptions to the freeze include those who are authorized to carry a handgun, and those who are involved with shooting competitions organized by the International Olympic Committee or the International Paralympic Committee.

== Statistics ==
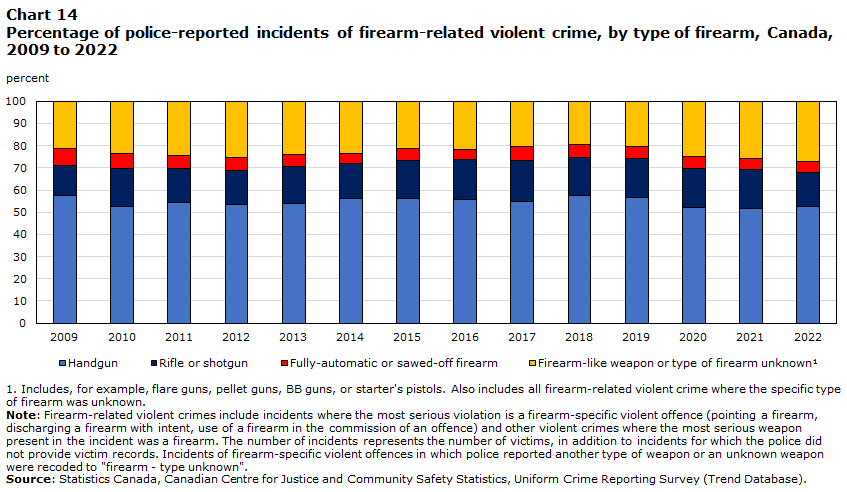

The rate of firearm-related violent crime has significantly increased in the past decade, mainly due to specific violent offences involving firearms such as discharging a firearm with intent and pointing a firearm. This rate more than doubled since 2013, reaching 12.2 incidents per 100,000 people in 2022. All provinces and territories have seen growth in these crimes, with the largest increases noted in the Northwest Territories (+303%), Saskatchewan (+165%), Yukon (+149%), and New Brunswick (+126%).

Saskatchewan had the highest rate of firearm-related violent crime in 2022 at 109.6 incidents per 100,000, while Prince Edward Island had the lowest at 10.0. Regina recorded the highest percentage of such crimes among census metropolitan areas at 83.0 incidents per 100,000.

The increase was particularly prominent in the territories (+139%) and rural areas (+141%). Handguns and unidentified firearm-like weapons saw the largest increases since 2013. In 2022, firearms were involved in 1.7% of injuries from violent crimes, with a higher percentage in severe cases. Most victims of firearm-related crimes were men (66%), and most accused individuals were also men (89%), although the rate of accused women rose significantly. Organized crime accounted for a higher proportion of firearm-related incidents compared to general violent crimes. The firearm-related homicide rate reached its highest since 1991 at 0.88 incidents per 100,000, primarily due to handguns.

=== Violent crime, suicide, and accidents ===
In the years immediately following the introduction of firearms licensing in Canada in 1976, the overall homicide rate did not significantly decline. Increases were seen in the proportion of murders committed by methods other than shooting; but these homicides were less likely to involve multiple victims. From 1977 to 2003, Canada firearm homicide has declined from 1.15 to 0.5 per 100,000, while other mechanisms declined from 1.85 to 1.23 per 100,000.

A comprehensive review of firearm control legislation found that studies on the effects of the 1977 bill C-51 and bill C-68 from 1995 on firearm homicide rates came to differing conclusions, but generally found that bill C-17 from 1991 was not associated with an overall reduction of firearm homicide. A 2011 study found no significant associations between gun laws passed and firearm homicide rates in Canada from 1974 to 2008. A 2020 study examining laws passed from 1981-2016 found no significant changes in overall homicide or suicide rates following changes in legislation. In addition, it also found that firearm ownership by province was not correlated to overall suicide rates by province.

As of 2010, shooting and stabbing represented the two most common mechanisms for homicide in Canada, each accounting for approximately one-third of murders.

Overall suicide in Canada peaked in 1978 at 14.5 per 100,000, declining by 22% (11.3 per 100,000) by 2004. Several studies have found that the 1977 bill C-51 was linked to lower suicide and firearm suicide rates in Canada. Several studies examining the effect of bill C-17 (primarily using data from Quebec) found that it was associated with a decline in firearm suicides, but that the rate of overall suicides did not change, largely because of a rise in suicides due to hanging, suggesting a substitution of suicide methods.

Accidental death, of any kind, claimed 27.9 people per 100,000 in 2000. Of these, firearms accidents accounted for 0.3% (0.1 per 100,000), ranking below the 37% for transportation (10.2 per 100,000), 28% for unspecified (7.7 per 100,000), 18% for falls (5.1 per 100,000), and 11% for poisoning (3.1 per 100,000). Two studies by Leenaars and Lester using national data from 1969 to 1985 find that bill C-51 was associated with a reduced accidental death rate from firearms.

== See also ==
- Canadian Firearms Program
- Dominion of Canada Rifle Association
- Gun politics
- Gun safe
- Index of gun politics articles
- List of mass shootings in Canada
- List of school shootings in Canada
- Possession and Acquisition Licence
