= Reference re Firearms Act =

Reference Re Firearms Act
- Supreme Court of Canada

Hearing: February 21, 22, 2000 Judgment: June 15, 2000
- Citations: 2000 SCC 31, [2000] 1 SCR 783
- Prior history: none (Reference question)

Holding
- The regulation of firearms is a matter of public safety and so is in the authority of the federal government under the criminal law power.

Court membership
- Chief Justice: Beverley McLachlin; Puisne Justices: Claire L'Heureux-Dubé, Charles Gonthier, Frank Iacobucci, John C. Major, Michel Bastarache, Ian Binnie, Louise Arbour, Louis LeBel

Reasons given
- Unanimous reasons by: The Court

Laws applied
- Constitution Act, 1867.

Reference Re Firearms Act is a leading constitutional decision of the Supreme Court of Canada on the division of powers regarding firearms legislation and the Canadian Firearms Registry. A unanimous Court held that the federal Firearms Act was constitutionally valid under the federal criminal law power.

== Background ==
In 1995, the Parliament of Canada passed the Firearms Act, which required owners of rifles and shotguns to register them, and to obtain possession licences for them. (Handgun registration was already required by federal law.)

The government stated that the law was passed under the authority of the federal government's criminal law power. The Firearms Act was closely integrated with the federal Criminal Code, so that failures to comply with the requirements of the former could in some cases be prosecuted as offences under the latter.

=== Alberta Court of Appeal reference ===
On September 26, 1996, the government of Alberta under Premier Ralph Klein submitted a reference question to the Alberta Court of Appeal under section 27 of the Judiciary Act. The Court was asked to determine whether the Firearms Act was in relation to matters under the jurisdiction of the federal government. (Note: Reference Re Firearms Act, 1998 ABCA 305 (CanLII), paras 6–7.) The government posed four questions to the Court:

1. Do the licensing provisions, insofar as they relate to an ordinary firearm, constitute an infringement of the jurisdiction of the Legislature of Alberta with respect to the regulation of property and civil rights pursuant to section 92(13) of the Constitution Act, 1867?
2. If the answer to the question posed in subsection (1) is “yes”, are the licensing provisions ultra vires the Parliament of Canada insofar as they regulate the possession or ownership of an ordinary firearm?
3. Do the registration provisions, as they relate to an ordinary firearm, constitute an infringement of the jurisdiction of the Legislature of Alberta with respect to the regulation of property and civil rights pursuant to section 92(13) of the Constitution Act, 1867?
4. If the answer to the question posed in subsection (1) is “yes”, are the registration provisions ultra vires the Parliament of Canada insofar as they require registration of an ordinary firearm? (Note: Reference Re Firearms Act, 1998 ABCA 305 (CanLII), para 7.)

The governments of Saskatchewan, Manitoba, the Northwest Territories, Yukon, and national pro gun organizations intervened arguing the provisions were ultra vires of Parliament. The government of Ontario intervened arguing only the registration was ultra vires of Parliament. Two organizations, the Alberta Council of Women's Shelters and the Coalition for Gun Control intervened in support of the Firearms Act.

The Alberta Court of Appeal upheld the constitutional validity of the Firearms Act, with Chief Justice Catherine Fraser, Justice Mary M. Hetherington and Justice Ronald Berger writing three separate reasons approving the legislation. Justices Carole Conrad and Howard Lawrence Irving wrote separate dissents.

The government of Alberta argued the law was in relation to personal property and thus was a matter in the jurisdiction of the province. However, the federal government argued the law was in the realm of criminal law, which is under federal jurisdiction.

== Opinion of the Court ==
The unanimous Court held that the pith and substance of the Act was in relation to "public safety" which was a matter within the criminal law power of the federal government. The Court cited the Margarine Reference for the requirements of criminal law and noted the danger of firearms, even if in some cases they could be used beneficially. Indeed, the regulations were judged to promote responsible firearm ownership, and the Court went on to argue that there would be a moral danger if firearms are used irresponsibly (morality is an element in criminal law, as established in the Margarine Reference), although the Court said that it was not just a matter of morality that gave Parliament the authority to pass this legislation.

The Court also noted that firearms have been subject to federal regulation for years and that the government of Alberta could not reasonably challenge many of the earlier laws.

Finally, the Court rejected all arguments that the law was too expensive or disadvantageous to rural regions, as these were matters for Parliament to consider rather than legal issues liable to judicial review.

== See also ==
- Quebec (AG) v Canada (AG): a follow-up case
- Gun politics in Canada
- List of Supreme Court of Canada cases (McLachlin Court)
