= Shooting sports in Canada =

Recreational and competitive-level shooting in Canada

Shooting sports in Canada are practiced across the country at recreational and competitive levels, including internationally and at the Olympics. Each province has its own organizations that govern the various disciplines. Many of the disciplines are connected nationally and some are part of larger international organizations.

== History of shooting sports in Canada ==
Shooting sports in Canada have a distinguished history, largely shaped by the Dominion of Canada Rifle Association (DCRA), founded on April 1, 1868. The DCRA unified various rifle associations to promote marksmanship nationwide. Its first Annual Prize Meeting in Montreal drew over 900 competitors.

Canadian shooters have competed in England since 1870, with the DCRA team’s first appearance at Wimbledon in 1872. The DCRA established the Canadian Pavilion at Bisley Camp in 1897, providing a base for Canadian marksmen at the Imperial Meeting3.

The DCRA’s National Range was initially at Rockcliffe, moving to the Connaught Ranges in 1921. These ranges have hosted the Annual Prize Meeting almost every year, except during the World Wars.

Today, the DCRA continues to foster rifle shooting in Canada, conducting Service Rifle matches and a Winter Postal Programme for Cadets. Support from the Government of Canada has been instrumental in the DCRA’s ongoing mission to advance the sport of shooting.

== National shooting organizations ==
The Canadian Shooting Sports Association, Canadian Coalition for Firearm Rights, and the National Firearms Association are Canada's main firearm advocacy associations. They work at the national level to promote and protect the shooting sports. These organizations were created in reaction to increasing laws and regulations governing ownership and use of firearms in Canadian society. They are independent of one another, but share the common goals of promoting firearm culture, education, and safety.

=== Canadian Shooting Sports Association ===
The Canadian Shooting Sports Association (CSSA) was formed by the merger of the Ontario Handgun Association (OHA) and the Ontario Smallbore Federation (OSF). The CSSA is a national organization with representation and membership in every province and claims over 30,000 members. The CSSA supports, promotes, and sponsors all shooting sports and is politically active at the provincial and federal levels of government.

=== National Firearms Association ===
The National Firearms Association (NFA) is a non-profit dedicated to the promotion of marksmanship and firearm safety and the protection of rights related to hunting, self-defence, and property rights. They operate at the national level to ensure shooting sports and related activities. The NFA also provides legal information and assistance concerning firearm and property rights legislation. They publish the Canadian Firearms Journal.

=== Canadian Coalition for Firearm Rights ===
The Canadian Coalition for Firearm Rights (CCFR) is a volunteer firearms rights organization formed in 2015 as a splinter off of the National Firearms Association (NFA). The CCFR's vision is to maintain, protect and promote private firearm ownership.

=== Dominion of Canada Rifle Association ===
The Dominion of Canada Rifle Association (DCRA) is the national governing body for fullbore target shooting. Established on April 1, 1868, it is one of the oldest sport shooting organizations in the world. The DCRA was incorporated by an Act of Parliament 63-64 Victoria Chapter 99, assented to July 7, 1900.

The DCRA was formed by bringing together thirty-three disparate associations. The first Annual Prize Meeting was held just outside Montreal, with over 900 competitors vying for $5,500 in prize money. The DCRA has continued to hold prize meetings every year since, except during the two World Wars.

The DCRA has had several headquarters over the years. The Rideau Range near Ottawa served as the national range until 1897. In 1898, the Meeting moved to Rockcliffe, which permitted shooting from 200 to 1000 yards with room for extension back to 2000. In 1921, the Association moved again to Connaught Ranges, which they were granted the use of in perpetuity.

DCRA is affiliated to the International Confederation of Fullbore Rifle Associations and sends teams to World Championships every four years. As of 2022, DCRA teams had won the Palma Trophy four times for Canada - in 1901; 1967; 1972 and 1982.

Since 1872, the DCRA has sent teams to compete in the Imperial Meeting, hosted by the National Rifle Association on the historic Bisley Camp in England. This annual event is a significant part of the DCRA's history, marking over 150 years of participation. During the event, the team stays at the Canadian Pavilion, a unique and historic accommodation built almost entirely from materials shipped from Canada. The Pavilion, commissioned and constructed by the DCRA in 1897. Most of the funding for its construction was provided by the Government of Canada.

=== Shooting Federation of Canada ===
The Shooting Federation of Canada (SFC) (French: Federation de Tir Canada; (FTC)) is the national sport organization for target shooting sports in Canada. The SFC is responsible for the promotion, development and governing of organized, recreational and competitive target shooting in Canada. It is part of the Canadian Olympic Committee and represents Canada within the International Shooting Sport Federation. The SFC began in 1932 as the Canadian Small Bore Rifle Association. After the Second World War, the CSBA changed its name to the Canadian Civilian Association of Marksmen. It used this name until December 2, 1964. Since then it has been known as The Shooting Federation of Canada. The SFC issues multiple awards every year to Canadian athletes that distinguish themselves in their shooting sport. The SFC similarly hosts the annual National Championships for the disciplines falling under pistol, rifle, skeet and trap shooting.

=== Canadian University Shooting Federation ===
The Canadian University Shooting Federation (CUSF) is a national non-profit organization established in January 2018, which promotes amateur sport shooting for post-secondary students in Canada.

Programs include Smallbore Rifle, Trap and Skeet. To administer these leagues the CUSF works with sporting organizations such as the SFC, NSSA, and ATA, among others. In 2020 there was 19 affiliated clubs at schools across Canada. The organization is apolitical, open to all, and promotes safe and responsible firearms use.

The Canadian University Shooting Federation has an active application for Registered Canadian Amateur Athletic Association (RCAAA) charitable status.

=== International Practical Shooting Confederation Canada ===
The International Practical Shooting Confederation Canada (IPSC Canada) is the Canadian affiliate of the International Practical Shooting Confederation.
