= Airport Security Police (Bermuda) =

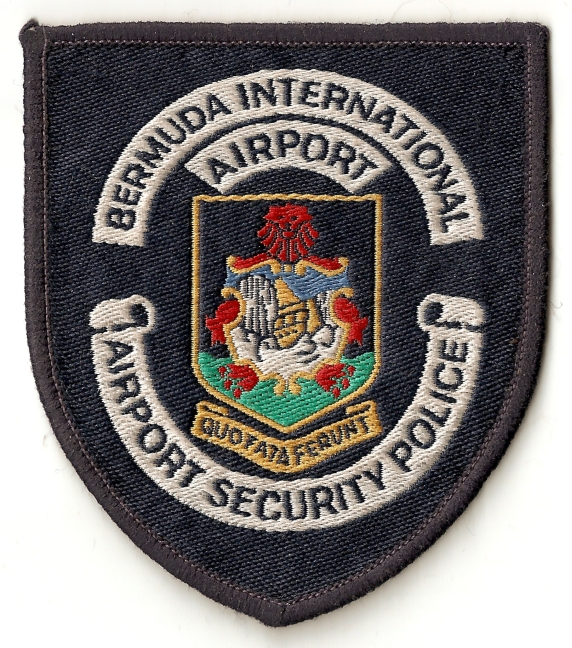
- Bermuda Airport Security Police patch

- Flag of Bermuda

Agency overview
- Formed: 1995

Jurisdictional structure
- Operations jurisdiction: Bermuda International Airport, British Overseas Territories
- Area: 536 acres (2.17 km^{2})
- Population: No residential population
- General nature: Civilian police

Operational structure
- Headquarters: Bermuda International Airport
- Sworn members: 20

Facilities
- Stations: 1

The Airport Security Police is the police force of the Bermuda International Airport.

== History of the Bermuda International Airport ==
Prior to 1995, the airfield was a US Naval Air Station, NAS Bermuda. Following an ABC News investigative report by Sam Donaldson, which scandalised it as the 'Club Med of the US Navy', NAS Bermuda, and the other US Naval facilities in Bermuda, were slated for rapid closure. The northern end of the airfield had originally been operated by RAF Transport Command (although the first aircraft to be based on the field were Royal Navy Fleet Air Arm target tugs that relocated from Royal Naval Air Station Bermuda in 1943), during the Second World War.

Following the War, all of the RAF establishment in Bermuda had been withdrawn, but the senior local RAF officer, Wing Commander Edward Maurice "Mo" Ware, DFC, remained on loan to the local government (eventually becoming the civilian Director of the Department of Civil Aviation), and oversaw the conversion of the RAF facilities into a Civil Air Terminal (the rest of the airfield, Kindley Field, was, at that time, operated by the US Army Air Forces). By 1945, flying boats were rapidly being replaced as airliners by landplanes, and civil airlines began using the US Army's runway to access the Bermuda Government's terminal. In 1948, the US Army Air Forces became the independent US Air Force, the airbase became Kindley Air Force Base, and the civil flying boat airport on Darrell's Island closed completely. The United States Navy has built its Naval Operating Base Bermuda at the same time that the United States Army had constructed Kindley Field, and had used it as a base for maritime patrol flying boats until 1965, when these were replaced with landplanes and the US Navy's air operations at Bermuda were moved to Kindley Air Force Base. In 1970, by when the United States Air Force had little need of a trans-Atlantic staging post due to the increased range of its bombers and transport aircraft, the airfield was transferred to the US Navy. When the US Navy withdrew from Bermuda in 1995, operation of the entire airfield was handed over to the Bermuda Government, and it was renamed the Bermuda International Airport (with the Civil Air Terminal no longer distinguished within it).

== Airport policing prior to 1995 ==
As a US Naval Air Station, policing of most of the airfield had been a US Naval responsibility, carried out by US NAS Bermuda Police, and by US Navy Security Detachments (for a time, there had also been a US Marine Corps detachment).

The area used by the Bermuda Government, comprising the Civil Air Terminal, and what are now labelled Aprons One and Two, with that part of the taxiways and former runway (currently Taxiway Bravo) which lay between, were policed by the Bermuda Police Service (BPS). The Bermuda Police Service maintained a small station in the Civil Air Terminal, controlled the access points to airside used by workers and vehicles, drove vehicle patrols, and kept watch on the tarmac (with no jetways, passengers at the airport are able to mingle with apron workers). The Bermuda Police Service was responsible for all policing duties on the airside of the Civil Air Terminal, including arresting and removing passengers from aircraft, and responding to emergencies. The Airport Police Station had no jail facilities, but also served to hold people detained by other agencies (Bermuda Immigration, HM Customs, US Customs, Immigration and Agriculture) 'til they could be transferred to the St. George's Police Station. The duties facing the service at the airport were considered unarduous, and it was long used as the first posting for newly-trained constables.

== Creation of the Airport Security Police ==
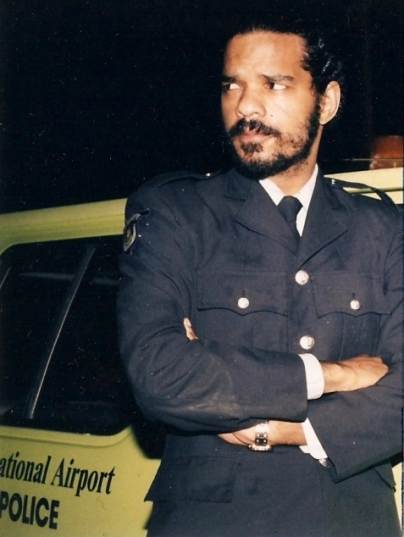
An AS Policeman

In 1995, with the withdrawal of the US Navy, the Bermuda government took on responsibility for policing the entire airfield. Unfortunately, Bermuda was still feeling the effects of the recession of the early 1990s, and this had led to a reduction in the manpower of the Bermuda Police Service. At the same time, the new Police Commissioner, Colin Coxall , was determined to modernise the Bermuda Police Service by returning it to its roots . It was felt that the service had lost familiarity with the community it was policing, with constables waiting in police stations to react to situations, rather than walking the beat, anticipating, and preventing them. As the Bermuda Police Service attempted to redirect its efforts to more traditional 'community policing', which required a greater manpower, it found itself short of constabulary. Many non-policing roles within the service were reassigned to civilians in order to place more police officers on the street, but it was ultimately decided to withdraw the detachment from the airport in order to make-up the shortfall elsewhere.

The Bermuda Government was still responsible for the policing of the airfield, which responsibility fell to the Ministry of Transport's (MOT) Department of Air Operations (DAO). Rather than organise a new police force itself, the DAO contracted a private company (Island Wide Security Services – now Bermuda Security Group) to organise, recruit, train, and operate the force on its behalf. Recruiting was primarily of ex-service personnel. This included former members of the Bermuda Police Service, the Bermuda Reserve Constabulary, The Royal Bermuda Regiment (which trains in Internal security as a potential back-up to the civil police), the Royal Navy and Royal Marines. Former US Naval personnel resident in Bermuda have also been recruited.

The new Airport Security Police took over all airside duties from the Bermuda Police Service (and the US Naval Security Detachments) in 1995. Those parts of the US Naval Base not necessary for the operation of the airfield were fenced off, and were guarded, til the area was redeveloped, by Baselands Security, security guards (who lacked police powers) recruited and controlled by the Bermuda Police Service.

== Organisation of the Airport Security Police ==
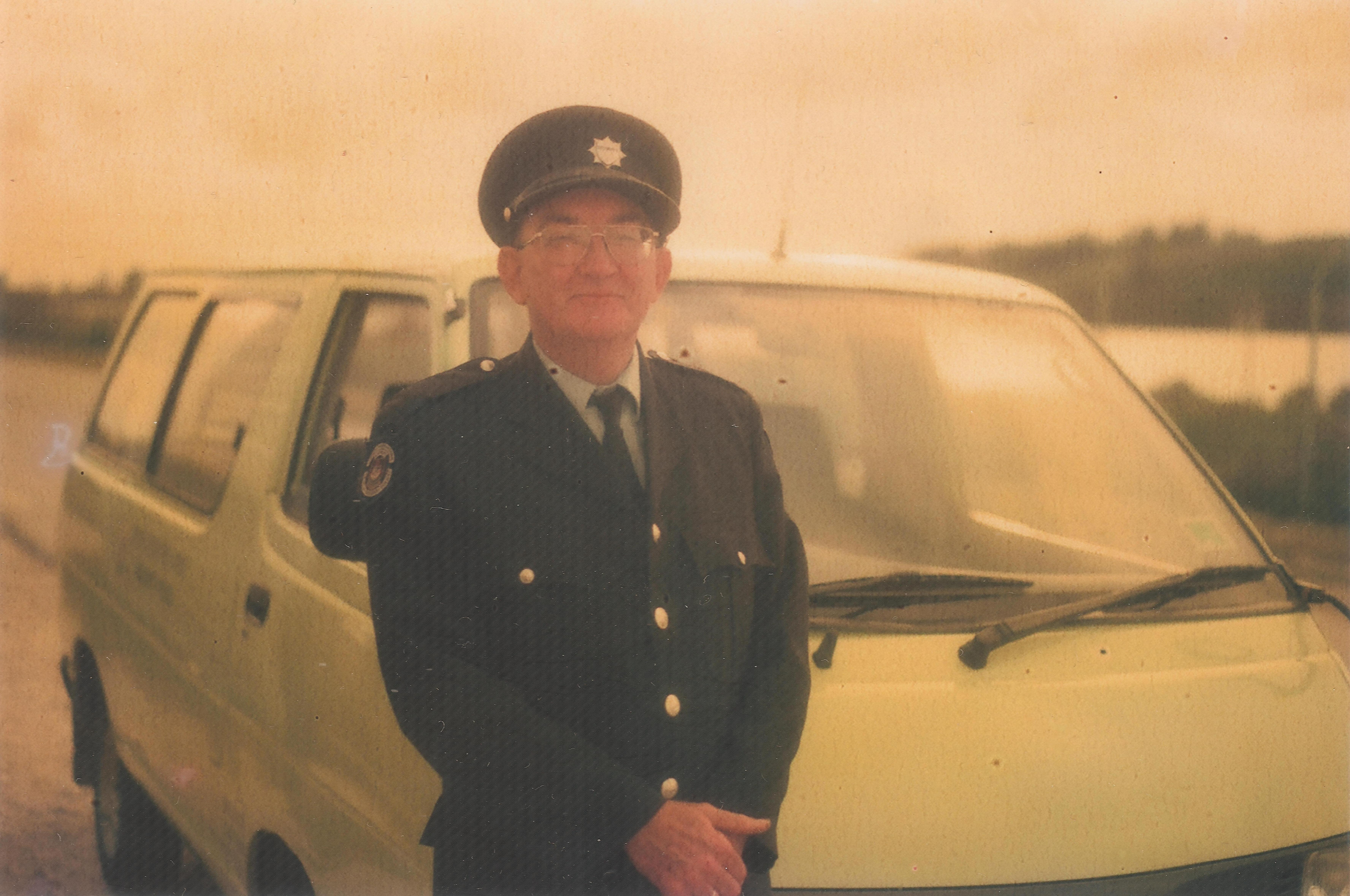
A Policeman of the Airport Security Police

The unit has a strength of about twenty, under the control of a uniformed manager, a former senior officer of the Bermuda Police Service.

The Bermuda Police Service vets recruits, who are trained with the assistance of the Bermuda Police Training School. The Airport Security Police operates under the instruction of the DAO's Aviation Security Officer. Its powers, including its powers of arrest, are all drawn from the Air Transport Act.

As a British Overseas Territory, security of the airfield, and of aviation in Bermuda, is ultimately the responsibility of the UK Government. The National Aviation Security Plan (NASP) of the UK Government's Department for Transport, Local Government and the Regions (DTLR) (now the Department for Transport (DfT)), also determined the content of the Bermudian NASP, which describes the roles, responsibilities and procedures relating to security of the Bermuda International Airport.

Consequently, the ASP also act under the oversight of the UK Department for Transport's (DfT) Regional Aviation Security Officer, responsible for Bermuda and for other British Overseas Territories in the Atlantic and the West Indies, based in the United States. Additionally, as the airspace around Bermuda has, by an agreement between the UK and US Governments, been placed under US control, and as passengers flying directly to the United States from Bermuda pre-clear US Immigration and Customs in Bermuda before entering the departure lounge, the duties of the Airport Security Police are also shaped by activities in the US and necessarily have the effect of assisting with the security of the US border.

== See also ==
- Bermuda Police Service
- Military of Bermuda
- L.F. Wade International Airport
