= Border security in the United States =

In the United States, border security includes the protection of ports, airports, and the country's 3,017-mile (4,855 km) land border with Canada and 1,933-mile (3,111 km) border with Mexico.

Central to U.S. national security, border security incorporates responses to issues such as terrorism, illegal immigration, smuggling, and human trafficking. The Department of Homeland Security (DHS), established after the September 11 attacks, is the primary institution responsible for adapting border security measures to counter perceived threats effectively.

The U.S. approach to border security has evolved in response to incidents like the 9/11 terrorist attacks, which triggered extensive policy reforms to increase the resources provided for homeland protection. These reforms also included the tightening of visa issuance procedures and stricter border controls, accompanied by ongoing debate over the balance between open borders and national security, especially on the politically sensitive US-Mexico border.

== Historical context ==
Immediately after the events of September 11, 2001, the Federal Government placed a higher priority on homeland security, such as intelligence reform. Following 9/11, the border security apparatus was heavily scrutinized and became the target of public criticism. Moreover, border security issues drew additional criticism from the public and from senior officials in the government after it emerged that the 9/11 hijackers held temporary U.S. tourist visas, which allowed legal entry into the US. Following the 2001 attacks, various measures have been implemented to increase border security, including the creation of the Department of Homeland Security (DHS) in 2002, as well as a number of other new policies and procedures.

== Threats of terrorism ==
=== Land borders ===
The sheer sizes of both the Canada–US and Mexico–US borders present the federal government's security forces with challenges with regard to their ability to protect the homeland. According to a 2004 report from the Congressional Research Service, there are "great difficulties in securing the many points through which people and goods may enter legally, and the thousands of miles of ‘lines’, thinly guarded stretches of coasts and land borders which entry is illegal."

Given the phenomenon of undocumented migration at the U.S.-Mexico border, some government officials and political candidates have made public statements referring to the threat of terrorists crossing the Southwest border. The Washington Office on Latin America Border Fact Check blog has pointed out that the Mexico section of the State Department's 2012 Country Reports on Terrorism notes that "No known international terrorist organization had an operational presence in Mexico and no terrorist group targeted U.S. citizens in or from Mexican territory". In 2011, the DHS affirmed that it did not have "any credible information on terrorist groups operating along the Southwest border".

=== Ports ===
The Federal Government faces threats to national security through its many ports. As part of her testimony at a Congressional Hearing on container security, JayEtta Hecker, Director for Physical Infrastructure Issues at the Government Accountability Office, said "drugs and illegal aliens are routinely smuggled into this country, not only in small boats but also hidden among otherwise legitimate cargoes on large commercial ships. These same pathways are available for exploitation by a terrorist organization or any nation or person wishing to attack us surreptitiously." Ms. Hecker's testimony also touched on the fact that the sheer number of cargo containers that enter the United States augments this threat. According to the March 2008 edition of Scientific American, more than 42 million 20-foot (6.1 m) containers enter U.S. ports each year.

=== Airports ===
More than 87 million people enter the U.S. every year through airports, which makes them a primary point of entry for potential terrorists. For example, in May 2012, the Central Intelligence Agency (CIA) revealed that it uncovered a plot to bring down a commercial plane using explosive devices. According to the CIA, these plans belonged to members of Al-Qaeda.

== Current policies and security mechanisms ==
=== Land borders ===
In a 2008 article for the Manhattan Institute, Rudolph Giuliani argued that border security was one of the most critical issues facing the United States, and should by monitored by a single organization that embraced CompStat, the organizational philosophy of the New York City Police Department. A myriad of agencies guard U.S. land borders, including the United States Border Patrol, U.S. Immigration and Customs Enforcement (ICE), the DHS, and the National Guard.

The DHS has completed nearly 700 miles of fencing along the borders, and, as of 2011, 20,700 border patrol agents were employed to guard the border. In addition, the Border Patrol now has more than 18,300 agents deployed on both the southern and northern border. The DHS uses technology along the border such as unattended ground sensors, truck-mounted mobile surveillance systems, remote video surveillance systems, unmanned aerial systems, fixed- and rotary-wing aircraft, and the Augmented Integrated Surveillance Intelligence System (ISIS).

=== Ports ===
From 2001 to 2006, the Federal Government increased funding for port security by 700%. This increase in funding allowed the DHS to implement a defense in depth against external threats. U.S. Customs and Border Protection, the U.S. Coast Guard, Terminal Operator, and the Port Authority shared responsibility for providing security at U.S. ports. In 2006, those agencies screened all cargo entering the country. U.S. Customs and Border Protection utilized X-ray, gamma ray machines, and radiation detection devices to screen cargo, operating over 680 radiation portal monitors and over 170 large scale non-intrusive inspection devices. In addition, there were more than 600 canine teams that could "identify narcotics, bulk currency, human beings, explosives, agricultural pests, and chemical weapons" working U.S. ports of entry.

=== Airports ===
Due to the massive numbers of travelers, and the consequent pressure for airport security mechanisms to be quick, efficient, and effective, the DHS has implemented the Automated Targeting System, a data mining program. The Automated Targeting System works by collecting information from airlines such as passport data, credit card numbers, and identity information. That information is then run against a list of known terrorists, phone numbers connected to terrorist cells, and other pertinent intelligence data.

On November 19, 2001, the United States passed the Aviation and Transportation Security Act, creating the Transportation Security Administration (TSA), and requiring airlines to pass information on all U.S. bound travelers to the DHS. This data is fed into the Automated Targeting System, and helps TSA, FBI, CIA, and other organizations to create the Selectee and No Fly List.

In addition to the ATS, another mechanism to deter terrorists is utilized in case they are not detected by the flagging protocols. Federal Air Marshals are the law enforcement branch of the Transportation Security Administration. They fly either in uniform or incognito and act as the law enforcement while on board to protect passengers and crew members from criminals and terrorists.

The Secondary Security Screening Selection system flags passengers for extra surveillance while in the airport but does not prohibit them from flying. These individuals, often referred to as "selectees", are pulled aside at security checkpoints and searched thoroughly. Their luggage may be hand searched. Individuals are added to the lists through airport screening processes. Individuals are potentially flagged if they have purchased a ticket in cash, purchased a ticket within the previous 24 hours, purchased a one-way ticket, or arrived with no baggage.

Starting in March 2010, the TSA begin a wide-scale deployment of full body scanners, in addition to metal detectors, to physically screen airline passengers.

=== No Fly List ===
The No Fly List, a comprehensive list of individuals prohibited from flying into or out of the United States, has exponentially grown in size. The List existed before 9/11 but only contained the names of 16 people and now lists over one million names. The List includes high-profile individuals such as the Bolivian President and other foreign dignitaries. The List still contains 14 out of the 19 September 11 hijackers and several other deceased individuals.

The system occasionally leads to a "false positive" which is the accidental flagging of individuals that have similar names to suspected terrorists or are on the List for illegitimate reason. In some cases, children under the age of five have been flagged as suspects. It contains many common names such as Gary Smith or Robert Johnson which makes traveling very difficult for all individuals with that name. Several U.S. congressmen have name matches on the list including Senator Ted Kennedy, who has subsequently been stopped at airports. The List does not include the names of individuals involved in the liquid explosive terrorist attack attempt. TSA also reported that some of the names of the most dangerous terrorists are not on the list in case the List is leaked. Daniel Brown, a U.S. Marine returning from Iraq, was denied entry into the United States because his name matched one on the list. He later found out that he had been flagged on a previous flight for having gunpowder residue on his boots which was likely acquired during an earlier tour of duty in Iraq.

== Impact of US-Mexico border security policies ==
Between 2010 and 2012, the DHS seized almost 75% more money, over a third more narcotics, and nearly double the weapons seized between 2006 and 2008 along the south-west border. In the same period, south-west border states have experienced an average 40% drop in violent crime rates, and the four major cities with the lowest crime rates in the US are all in border states.

== See also ==
- Advance Passenger Information System
- American entry into Canada by land
- Airport Security Police (Bermuda)
