= Possession and acquisition licence =

Primary firearms licence under Canadian firearms laws

- Sample of a Possession and Acquisition Licence (PAL)
- Type: Firearms licence
- Issued by: Canadian Firearms Program
- First issued: 1995
- Purpose: Possession and acquisition of firearms
- Valid in: Canada
- Eligibility: Safety training course completion, enhanced background check
- Expiration: 5 years
- Cost: Varies by classification

The possession and acquisition licence (PAL; French: permis de possession et d'acquisition) is the firearms licence in Canada that permits eligible individuals to acquire and possess firearms in Canada. Applicants for a PAL must be 18 years of age or older. Minors 12–17 can apply for a minor's licence to borrow non-restricted firearms only.

All PAL applicants need to undergo a series of background checks, security screenings, and complete the Canadian Firearms Safety Course (CFSC). RPAL holders who possess registered handguns are not given unconditional rights to carry firearms in a public setting, and need to possess a valid authorization to transport or authorization to carry permit issued by their province's respective chief firearms officer.

In Canada, firearms are classified into prohibited, restricted and non-restricted categories. The correct classification is required on the licence to acquire and possess the classification of firearm (i.e, PAL for non-restricted, RPAL for restricted, Prohib 12.x for prohibited).

== History ==
PALs were introduced in Canada in 1995 as part of Bill C-68 as a replacement for the FAC (firearms acquisition certificate) system. Whereas the FAC was only required to acquire a firearm, a PAL is required to both acquire and possess firearms and to acquire ammunition. A PAL for non-restricted firearms allows its holders to acquire and possess any non-restricted firearm, while an RPAL for restricted firearms allows the holder to acquire and possess restricted firearms. Only those who are grandfathered into the prohibited-class of firearms (12.2, 12.3 etc.) are able to acquire and possess prohibited firearms.

When first implemented, the PAL also allowed the holder to acquire a crossbow, although no licence was required to possess one. There is no longer a licensing requirement for purchasing crossbows.

Since December 15, 2023, a PAL is required to acquire cartridge magazines, the same as for acquiring ammunition.

== Obtaining/applying ==
All licensing of firearms in Canada is managed by the Canadian Firearms Program of the Royal Canadian Mounted Police. In the Canadian system, there are three classes of firearms and firearm licences: non-restricted, restricted and prohibited.

A possession and acquisition licence allows individuals in Canada to possess and acquire firearms and ammunition. Licences are valid for five years and must be renewed prior to expiry to maintain the licensed classes. If a person possessing a PAL is convicted of certain offences, the PAL can be revoked. If a person does not renew their PAL prior to its expiration date or if they have their PAL revoked, they must legally dispose of any firearms in their possession. A licence for prohibited firearms can be issued to qualifying businesses, and very rarely to individuals (firearms they own, as the gun laws changed over time.) Previous convictions for serious violent, drug or weapons offences almost invariably result in the denial of the application.

A PAL is generally obtained in the following steps:

Formal application
Submit completed application (with supporting documents and guarantor-signed photo), and course report.
Security screening
Enhanced background check and investigations are performed, including contacting current/former conjugal partner and references. There is a minimum 28-day waiting period for all applicants who do not presently hold a valid firearms licence.
Mental and physical health screening
The screening process might request medical information to prove the applicant's mental health status.
Safety training
All PAL applicants must successfully complete the Canadian Firearms Safety Course (CFSC) for a non-restricted licence, and the Canadian Restricted Firearms Safety Course (CRFSC) for a restricted licence. The examinations contain both a written and practical component, and must be passed with 80% or higher on both. Information on the locations and availability of these courses can be found online or at the RCMP website.

== Other firearms licences ==
Other firearm licences for individuals include:

- Minor's licence (12–17) permits borrowing a non-restricted firearm. Usually applicant must be at least 12, although exceptions can be made if one can demonstrate "need". (Requirements, including courses, are substantially the same as PAL.)
- Possession-only licence (POL), which no longer exist. All POLs were converted to PALs. The POL was a grandfathered class of licence that permitted possession of firearms and acquisition of ammunition, but not acquisition of firearms.
- Non-resident temporary borrowing licence for non-restricted firearms
- Non-resident temporary possession licence for minors (non-restricted firearms)
- Executor of will. While not technically a licence, the executor of a will, in many cases, can temporarily have custody of firearms as part of an estate, without themselves having a firearms licence.

NOTE: While issued licences read either "Possession • Acquisition" or "Possession Only", the Firearms Act and regulations refer to either "possession and acquisition licence" or "possession licence", without the word only.

== Licences by province or territory ==
Individual firearms licences, 2023
Province or territory	Valid licences	Minor's licences	Population, 2019	Licences per 100 people
Total	2,352,504	12,222	37,811,399	5.87
Alberta	361,699	2,734	4,384,982	7.45
British Columbia	355,690	1,363	5,130,251	6.05
Manitoba	100,175	806	1,374,081	6.80
New Brunswick	74,380	199	780,631	9.09
Newfoundland and Labrador	75,564	492	523,847	14.72
Northwest Territories	5,926	29	45,189	13.33
Nova Scotia	78,299	583	976,495	7.89
Nunavut	3,245	30	38,625	9.99
Ontario	667,726	5,212	14,638,247	4.29
Prince Edward Island	6,941	32	158,778	4.11
Quebec	494,557	167	8,542,198	5.83
Saskatchewan	119,681	506	1,176,427	9.62
Yukon	8,621	69	41,648	19.17

== See also ==
- Canadian Firearms Registry
- Dominion of Canada Rifle Association
- Firearms regulation in Canada
