= Gunshow (disambiguation) =

In the United States, a gunshow is an event where promoters generally rent large public venues and then rent tables for display areas for dealers of guns and related items, and charge admission for buyers.

Gunshow or Gun show may also refer to:

- Gunshow (webcomic), 2008 American webcomic
- "Gunshow" (Law & Order), episode of NBC's legal drama Law & Order
- "The Gun Show", 2010 song by American band In This Moment
