= Authorization to carry =

An authorization to carry (ATC) is a permit issued by the Royal Canadian Mounted Police (RCMP) under the Canadian Firearms Program permitting bearers of a possession and acquisition licence (PAL) to carry firearms in a public setting. Those seeking a ATC must provide a rationale to their chief firearms officer and a detailed explanation for the purpose of carry (i.e, professional, occupational, hunting, or personal protection needs).

== See also ==
- Firearms regulation in Canada
- Hunting license
