= Chief firearms officer =

The chief firearms officer (CFO) is a Canadian official responsible for possession and acquisition licences, authorizations to transport, authorizations to carry, transfers of firearms, and gun show sponsorship approvals.

Each CFO oversees a designated province/region, specifically:

- Alberta — office in Edmonton
- British Columbia and Yukon — office in Surrey, BC
- Manitoba and Nunavut — office in Winnipeg, MB
- New Brunswick — office in Fredericton
- Newfoundland and Labrador — office in St. John's
- Northwest Territories — office in Edmonton, AB
- Nova Scotia — office in Halifax
- Ontario — office in Orillia
- Prince Edward Island — office in Charlottetown
- Quebec — office in Montreal
- Saskatchewan — office in Saskatoon
