= Firearms Act (Canada) =

Canadian law regulation gun possession

Parliament of Canada
- Long title: An Act respecting firearms and other weapons
- Citation: S.C. 1995, c. 39
- Enacted by: 35th Canadian Parliament
- Assented to: December 12, 1995
- Bill citation: Bill C-68, 35th Parliament, 1st session

The Firearms Act (French: Loi sur les armes à feu) is the law in Canada that regulates firearms possession, means of transportation, and offenses. It was passed after the École Polytechnique massacre.

== Purpose ==
According to the Purpose section of the Act, its purpose under law is to regulate the licensing of firearms, authorizing the manufacture of firearms, and authorizing the transfer of, including importation, etc. of firearms. The Act does not apply to the Canadian Armed Forces.

More specifically, under the Act, the Government of Canada (the federal government) regulates licenses and authorizations for firearms, including prohibited or restricted firearms; the possession of prohibited or restricted weapons and any prohibited devices or ammunition; and licenses for the sale or transfer of cross-bows. The Act also authorizes the federal government to regulate the manufacturing of prohibited or restricted weapons, firearms, devices and ammunition; the transfer of such items; and the importation of those items and items related to automatic firearms.

== See also ==
- Firearms regulation in Canada
- Possession and Acquisition Licence

=== Similar international legislation ===
- Firearms (Amendment) (No. 2) Act 1997
- Arms Act 1983
