= Joy Laking =

Canadian artist (born 1950)

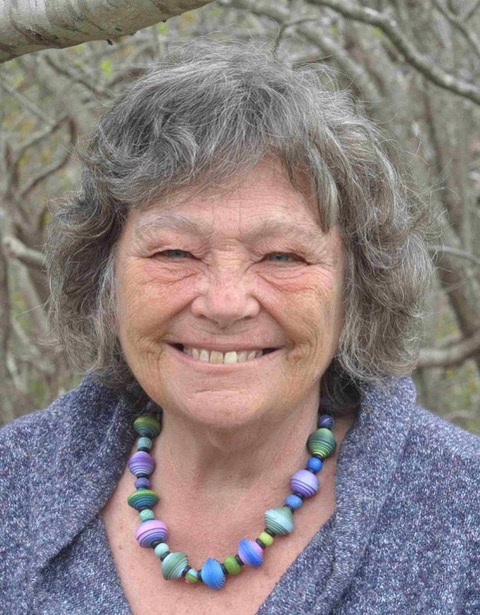
- Born: 1950 (age 75–76); Owen Sound, Ontario, Canada
- Education: Bachelor of Arts
- Alma mater: University of Guelph
- Known for: Painting
- Style: Realism
- Children: 3
- Awards: Queen Elizabeth II Diamond Jubilee Medal
- Website: www.joylakinggallery.com

Joy Snihur Wyatt Laking (born 1950) is a Canadian visual artist and author based in Nova Scotia, especially known for her watercolour depictions of Nova Scotian scenes. Born to an artistic family in Ontario, Laking painted with her mother at a young age before earning a Bachelor of Arts in 1972, subsequently moving to Nova Scotia where she went on to earn a national reputation. Laking opened a gallery in 1988 at her Portapique home to display her work, which remains open by appointment as of 2025.

Laking's paintings are characterized by representational realism, and have been displayed in Nova Scotia, New Brunswick, Ontario, and Quebec – including exhibitions at the Art Gallery of Nova Scotia and the Royal Botanical Gardens in Burlington. Her writings include Invisible Prisons, a play performed in Nova Scotia and New York; and the books Colours in Winter and The Painted Province, published in 2019 and 2020, respectively. Laking's work has earned her awards such as the Lifetime Achievement Award from the Cobequid Arts Council and the Queen Elizabeth II Diamond Jubilee Medal.

== Early life and education ==
Laking was born in 1950 in Owen Sound, Ontario, to an artistic family. Her mother was a professional painter, and her father crafted marionettes and toy trains. As a child, Laking frequently accompanied her mother on trips to the Georgian Bay to paint the scenery of the area. While enjoying these trips, she initially felt inadequate due to the difference in quality between her artwork and her mother's. Laking attended secondary school at Owen Sound Collegiate and Vocational Institute until graduating in 1969, predicting in a Grade 8 writing assignment that she would be making a living as an artist within ten years. She graduated from the University of Guelph with a Bachelor of Arts in 1972, marrying the same year, and subsequently moving to Nova Scotia with her husband. Around the time she graduated, her mother died of breast cancer, which would have a profound impact on her artistic career as her mother inspired her to become an artist.

Between 1980 and 1985, Laking and her husband had three children: Kelsey, Danica, and Yolande.

== Career ==
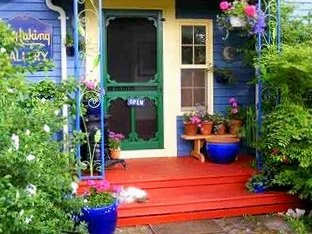

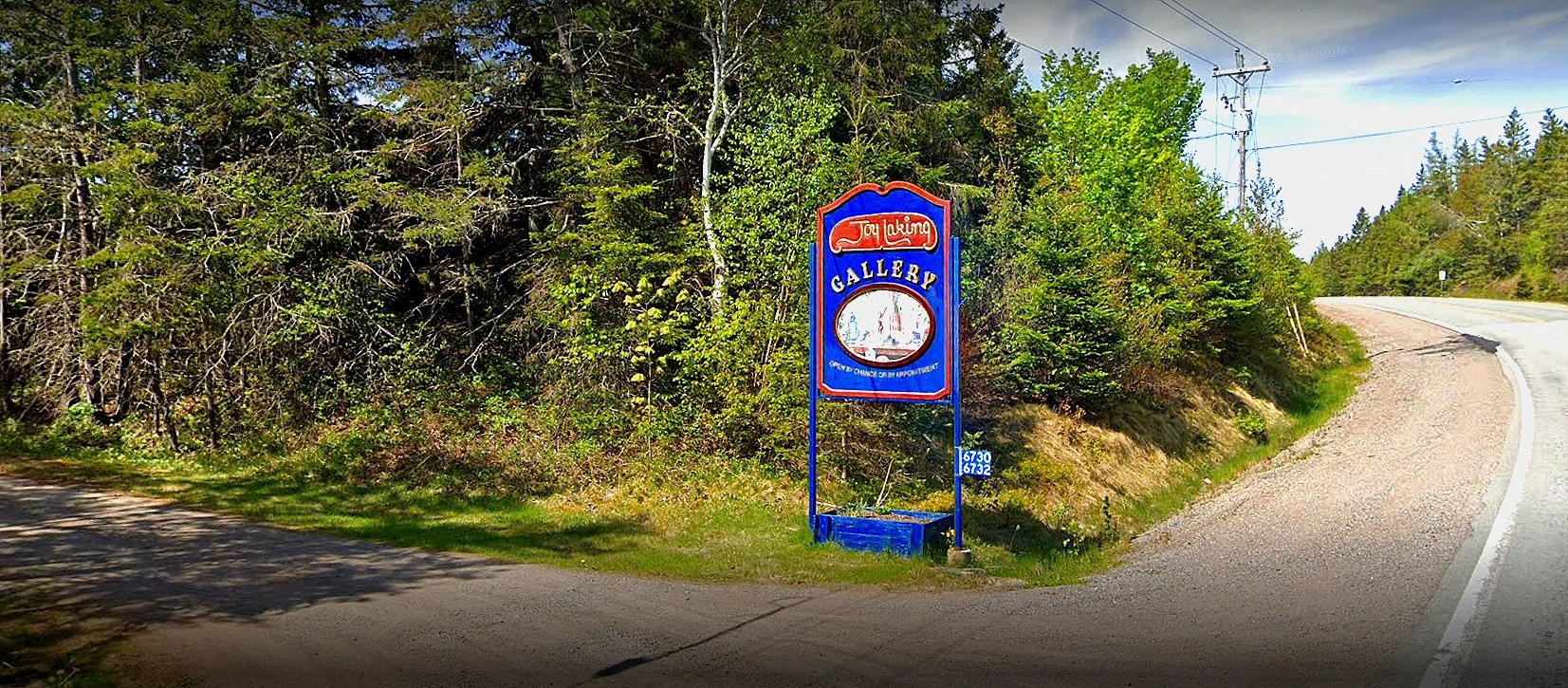
The Joy Laking Gallery opened in the late 1980s in Portapique

Following her move to Nova Scotia in 1972, Laking settled in Bass River and began her art career. In the early 1980s, she illustrated two children's books: The Brook and the Woodcutter and The Man Who Couldn't Stop Sneezing by Gary Saunders. While she enjoyed the illustration work, she considered the payment to be inadequate, and had to seek other opportunities. She subsequently released a set of calendars featuring her paintings. Laking went on to hold her first solo exhibition titled Flowers of Nova Scotia at the Mount Saint Vincent Art Gallery in 1982 and she began to earn a national reputation. In 1984, her work was chosen to be featured on the cover of the MTT provincial phone book, and 50 of her watercolour paintings were put on display at the Royal Botanical Gardens in Burlington, Ontario. In 1985, Laking held her first New Brunswick solo exhibition at the Owens Art Gallery at Mount Allison University. In the late 1980s, Laking and her husband built the Joy Laking Gallery at their Portapique home to display her work, opening the gallery in 1988. Her paintings have also been sold at private galleries in Halifax and Hamilton, Ontario. Between 1982 and 1992, Laking participated in six group exhibitions and held nine solo exhibitions, including a 40-piece watercolour exhibition at the Art Gallery of Nova Scotia in 1989, followed by a regional tour until May 1990. A collection of her paintings featuring summer and winter scenes was displayed at the Royal Botanical Gardens in 1990.

In 2006, a painting of a pink grapefruit by Laking was chosen to be featured on a postage stamp, as part of a campaign to raise funds for the Jewish General Hospital in Montreal. In 2007, after overcoming a serious health issue and inspired by travelling, Laking underwent what she referred to as an "explosion of creativity", branching out into other mediums such as photography, rug hooking, and wool dyeing. Laking held a dual exhibition with Laurie Gunn in Truro in January 2007 consisting entirely of photography.

In 2013, Laking was the community artist at the White Rabbit Arts Festival in Upper Economy and celebrated 25 years of annual open houses in autumn at the Joy Laking Gallery. In 2016, Laking was named artist-in-residence at the Port Bickerton Lighthouse. In 2017, Laking travelled throughout Europe and was given the opportunity to paint in the gardens of Claude Monet. In 2021, Laking's work was featured in two exhibitions at the Fraser Art Gallery in Tatamagouche.

In April 2020, Laking was deeply affected by the 2020 Nova Scotia attacks, a mass shooting that began close to her home in Portapique. The attacks claimed the lives of 22 people, including three of her friends. The impact of the shootings would affect Laking's career for some time, with her telling Global News in 2021: "After the tragedy, I couldn't see beauty anywhere. (I couldn't paint.) I didn't want to go out in the woods and sit". The COVID-19 pandemic exacerbated these stressors. She later began spending five hours per day in her studio as a method of coping. On 2 April 2022, nearly two years following the attacks, Laking published a poem on her Facebook page titled Our Portaupique, (Note: CTV News reports the title of the poem as Our Portpique. The text of the Facebook post refers to the poem as Our Portaupique.) further reflecting on the changes to the community in the wake of the attacks.

== Style ==
Laking's work is characterized by representational realism, with a focus on plein air paintings which capture the landscapes of Nova Scotia, particularly in the Bay of Fundy region. She is self-taught in watercolour painting, and is primarily known as a watercolourist; she also uses oils and acrylics. Laking's style is influenced by her travels to countries such as India, Ghana, Italy, and Portugal, informing her distinctive portrayals of Nova Scotian scenes. She names Emily Carr as inspiration for her work.

== Writings ==
=== Invisible Prisons ===
Invisible Prisons, a play by Laking, premiered on 8 March 2013 at the Marigold Cultural Centre in Truro. The play originated from a project in which Laking interviewed 35 victims of domestic abuse, creating 14 monologues. The monologues were well-received at a Women's Motivational Luncheon and Laking created the play as a method of further sharing the project. On 17 January 2013, Laking made a presentation to the Colchester County Municipal Council requesting financial support in the production of the play. Council voted unanimously to grant her request. The premiere of Invisible Prisons was produced by Lenore Zann with a cast from the Truro Theatre Society, with Bryden MacDonald revising the script and directing the cast. The play has also been performed by the Amherst Comedy Troupe Theatre Group in Amherst in 2014 and the Osler Society Medicine in Theatre Group at the Zucker School of Medicine in 2020.

=== Colours in Winter ===
In 2019, Laking published her first children's fiction book, Colours in Winter. The book was written and illustrated by Laking over 35 years prior to publishing. After sending a copy of the book to Pottersfield Press, a Nova Scotia-based publisher, they agreed to publish it following some alterations to the original work. The 36-page book follows a young girl who expresses disappointment in the lack of colour in the wintertime, wishing for other seasons to come. Colourful snowflakes begin to fall, at first to the delight of the girl, before she begins to feel there is now an overabundance of colour. When the snowflakes return to normal, the girl begins to notice the various colours in nature around her, such as rose hips, birds, and evergreens.

=== The Painted Province ===
External audio
- The Painted Province, an interview with Joy Snihur Wyatt Laking (27:25 min; 1 May 2022), from Archibald Studio, retrieved 19 April 2025 – via Audacy

In 2020, Laking published The Painted Province, a book featuring 200 of her paintings from 40 locations in Nova Scotia. In an interview with Fran Zell of Splash Magazines, Laking explained her intentions with the book, stating: "I didn't want it to be a coffee table book, so I made it so it would fit in a glove compartment and included GPS coordinates for each location. I thought, if families kept it in their glove compartment, they could say to their kids, 'Joy painted here. Let's go see the spot.'" The book was received positively by Lana Shupe of The Miramichi Reader, and Elissa Barnard of Billie.

=== Selected works ===
- Laking, Joy (2019). Colours in Winter. Pottersfield Press. ISBN 978-1-9882-8694-5. OCLC 1099800876.
- — (2020). The Painted Province. Pottersfield Press. ISBN 978-1-9897-2525-2. OCLC 1159035105.
- — (2025). Capturing Beauty: My Life in Oils, Watercolours and Words. MeisterWorks Publishing. ISBN 978-1-7779-4433-9.

== Honours and awards ==
Laking was awarded the Queen Elizabeth II Diamond Jubilee Medal in 2012, receiving the Lifetime Achievement Award from the Cobequid Arts Council the same year.

== See also ==
- Canadian art
- List of Canadian painters
- List of writers from Nova Scotia
