= Bass River, Nova Scotia =

Human settlement in Nova Scotia, Canada

Bass River
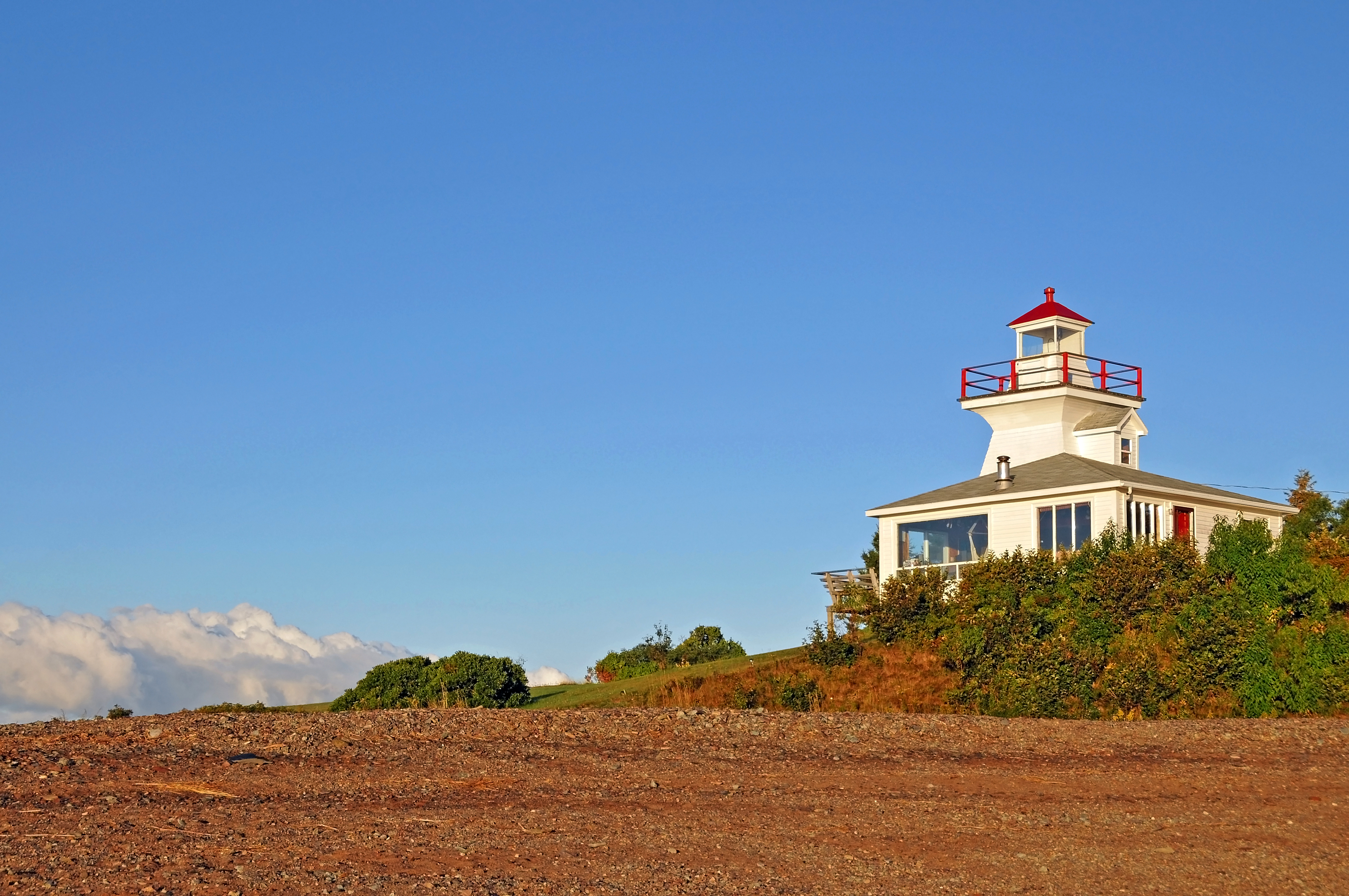
- Bass River Lighthouse

- Location within Nova Scotia
- Coordinates: 45°24′53″N 63°46′46″W
- Country: Canada
- Province: Nova Scotia
- Municipality: Colchester
- Time zone: UTC-4 (AST)
  - Summer (DST): UTC-3 (ADT)
- Postal code: B0M 1B0
- Area code: 902
- GNBC Code: CABYG

Bass River is an unincorporated community in the Canadian province of Nova Scotia, located in Colchester County. The community shares its name with the river that flows through it into the Cobequid Bay.

== History ==
Bass River was founded by members of the Ulster emigrant "Judge" James Fulton's family, who himself in c.1767 was the first to settle the area (at King's Rest) a decade after the tragic expulsion of Acadians from the region. Those who settled Bass River and its neighbouring communities were largely of direct Ulster-Scottish descent. Many of these settlers' descendants have remained in the community as is evident from a list of surnames prevalent in the area today. Ulster-Scottish Campbells, Creelmans, Davisons/Davidsons, Fishers, Fultons, McLellans, Starratts/Starritts, Vances, and Wilsons settled the area, as did Lewis's from Scotland.

Other common surnames of the area include Burns, Cameron, Carde, Carr, Cooke, Corbett, Dickie, Faulkner, Fletcher, Gamble, Gilbert, Grue, Jordan, Lawson, McIntosh, Rushton, Rutherford, Smith, Taggart, Taylor, Thompson, and Welch. Most of these names have Ulster-Scottish or Scottish origins, as much of Colchester County was settled by Ulster Scots.

Settlement took place in what was then merely an unnamed parcel of the Township of Londonderry, an area centred on the present-day community of Londonderry. Prior to British settlement, it is believed that Acadian families lived in what are now the neighbouring communities of Economy and Portapique (or Portaupique), places whose names were most likely derived from Acadian French language. Mi'kmaq Indigenous Peoples / First Nations peoples are thought to have hunted and gathered in Colchester County for several hundred years prior to British control and settlement.

Bass River was once known for its wooden furniture manufacturing, wooden ship-building, and timber exports. The furniture manufacturer, Dominion Chair Company, employed 40 to 70 workers at any one time from the late 19th century to February 1989, when fire destroyed most of the company's operating facilities. Shipbuilding took place in two locales. At Saint's Rest, site of the former village lighthouse, the brig 'Jos. Howe' was constructed in 1867. Between 1884 and 1918, a further seven wooden ships (Hemeon, 1987) were built in Little Bass River. Bass River timber was famously also used to build staging used in construction of the Empire State Building.

Other former industry included grist mill operations, shad fishing, and silica mining. In the early 20th century, there was a bank and a hotel located in the village. The population then was two or three times what it is now.

== Geography ==
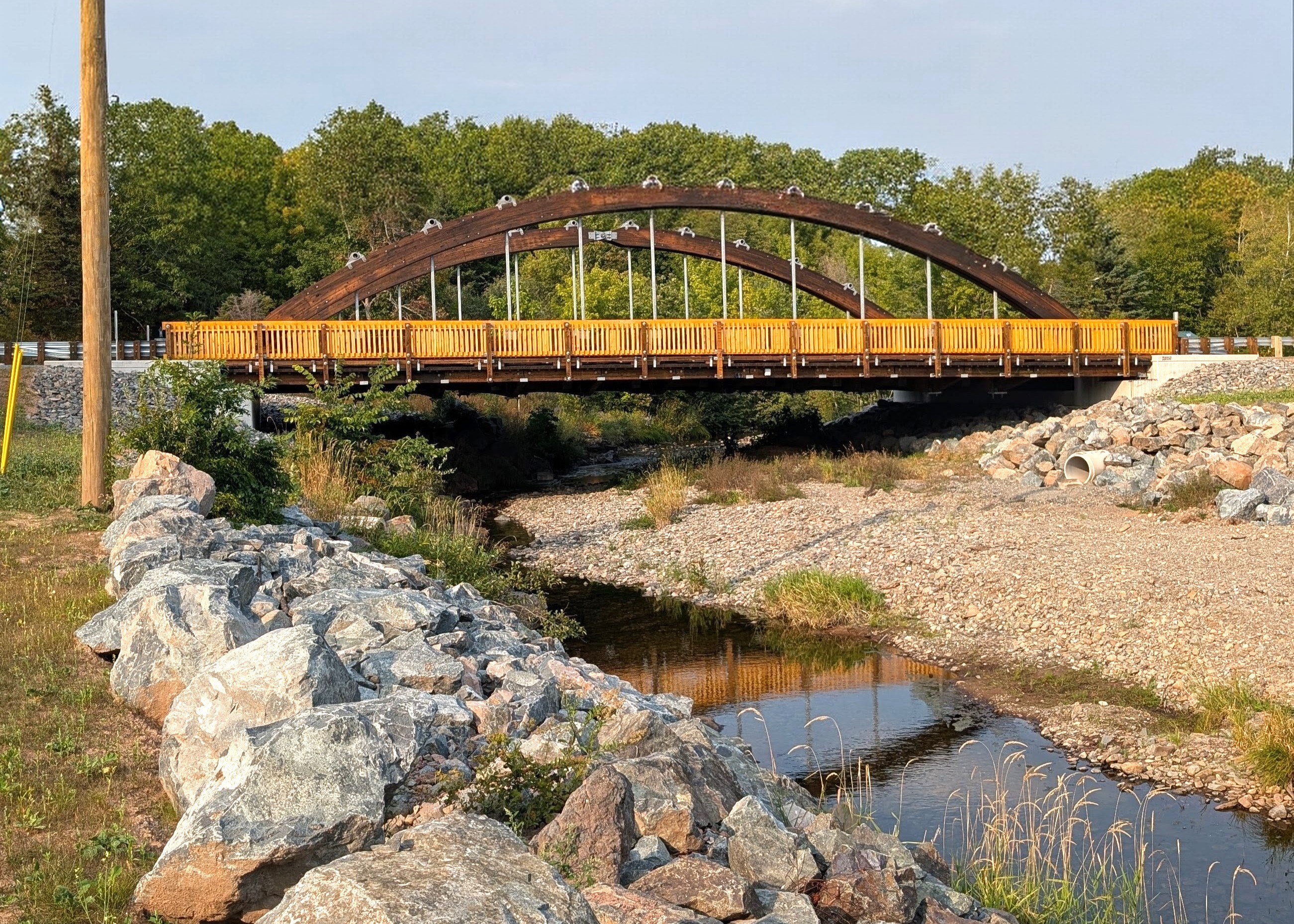
All-wood bridge carrying Trunk 2 over the Bass River, Bass River, Nova Scotia

Bass River is located along an approximate 4-kilometre (2.5 mi) stretch of Cobequid Bay north shoreline, from the bordering communities of Upper Economy to the west, Porta(u)pique to the east, and Castlereagh in the Cobequid Hills to the north. The community is centred at approximately 45°24' North, 63°46' West. Most of its residents live along or just off of the Trunk 2, the Glooscap Trail. Bass River's jurisdiction is thought locally to extend north from the bay approximately 5 km to include Upper Bass River and Hoeg(')s Corner, east to incorporate Little Bass River (which includes the areas Edgewood and Saint's Rest), and south to include Birch Hill and King's Rest.

=== Demographics ===
Bass River has a population of approximately 300 permanent residents. The number of residents increases in summertime by 20 to 40 percent with the influx of those with cottages in the area.

The region suffers from out-migration. More than half of those who grow up in Bass River leave the area to live, with Halifax, Ontario, Alberta and its petroleum products industry, British Columbia, and the Canadian Forces being common destinations.

== Economy ==
Present-day economic activity includes a few commercial farms (cultivated strawberries, dairy, and sheep), pulp wood, fire wood, and timber harvesting, lowbush blueberry and Christmas tree production, and clam mollusc harvesting (i.e. "clam digging").

Most present-day residents however commute to assorted work done outside the community. Most commuters go to Truro and its surrounding area.

== Education ==
West Colchester Consolidated is located on Maple Avenue in Bass River, and teaches grades primary to 9. A Chignecto-Central Regional School Board proposal to close the Bass River Elementary school was acted upon in 2013. Prior to this, West Colchester Consolidated students in grades primary to 4 attended Bass River Elementary, located on the same road.
