= Creelman =

Creelman is a surname of Scottish Lowlands and later Ulster-Scottish origin.

== Origin of name ==
Creelman is thought to have originated from an occupational name, derived from creel, which refers to a wicker basket used for putting fish inside.

== Distribution of name ==
=== United Kingdom ===
==== Scotland ====
In the mid-19th century, concentrations of people bearing the name Creelman were living in Scottish Lowland counties of Ayrshire, Lanarkshire, Midlothian, and Roxburghshire. The 1841 Census reports 54 people bearing the surname with 29 hailing from Ayrshire, 7 from Lanarkshire, 7 from Midlothian, and 5 from Roxburghshire. The 1851 census has 34 Creelmans living in Ayrshire, 11 in Roxburghshire, 8 in Lanarkshire, 5 in Fife, and 4 in Orkney. 1861 sees 24 Creelmans in Lanarkshire, 12 in Ayrshire, 9 in Orkney, 7 in Renfrewshire, just 2 in Roxburghshire, and 1 each in Fife and Midlothian.

By the turn of the 20th-century however, most Scots with the surname Creelman lived in Dunbartonshire, Lanarkshire, Renfrewshire, and in the far north in Orkney. The 1871 Scottish Census reported a total of 62 Creelmans - 30 in Lanarkshire, 10 in Orkney, 9 in Ayrshire, 5 in Selkirkshire, and 4 in Midlothian. 1881 saw 15 Creelmans in Renfrewshire, 13 in Lanarkshire, 10 in Orkney, 9 in Ayrshire, 4 in Argyll, 3 in Selkirkshire, 3 in Midlothian, and 2 in Dunbartonshire. The 1891 census lists 60 Creelmans - 21 living in Renfrewshire, 16 in Lanarkshire, 13 in Orkney, 4 in Dunbartonshire, 3 in West Lothian, 2 in Argyll, 1 in Midlothian, and none in Ayrshire. Finally, the 1901 Scottish Census lists 105 Creelmans, with 33 living in Renfrewshire, 32 in Lanarkshire, 15 Dunbartonshire, 15 Orkney, 8 in West Lothian, 1 in Midlothian, and 1 in Argyll.

==== Ulster ====
Ayrshire Creelmans migrated to Ulster during the 17th century. A concentration settled in the Coleraine and Limavady area of County Londonderry. Large numbers live in County Antrim as well.

==== England ====
Information gathered by Ancestry.co.uk on English Census reports has a "Robt Creelman" of Suffolk as the only Creelman to be recorded in the 1841 English census. The 1851 census recorded three Creelmans in Northumberland bordering Scotland and one in Northamptonshire. The 1861 census records but one Creelman again, an "H. Creelman" in Lancashire. The 1871 English census however records 15 Creelmans, with more 9 living in Warwickshire. Similarly, the 1881 census lists 12 Creelmans in total and 10 in Warwickshire. The 1891 Census lists 25 Creelmans in England with concentrations in Warwickshire, London, and Yorkshire. Finally, the 1901 census lists 39 English Creelmans living mostly in Warwickshire and London, but with none in Yorkshire.

=== North America ===
==== Canada ====
In 1756 three brothers Samuel, Matthew and Francis Creelman emigrated from Coleraine, County Londonderry, modern day Northern Ireland to Nova Scotia. Samuel settled in Upper Stewiacke, Cobequid District, and the other two elsewhere. All three grew prosperous

A concentration of Creelmans lived in Grey County, Ontario in the mid-19th century according to the 1851 Census report of Canada West.

==== United States ====
The first Creelman to appear on a United States Federal Census was "Wm Creelman" in 1820. The 1830 census reported 4 Creelmans, 2 in Fayette County, Indiana, 1 in Essex, Massachusetts, and 1 in Buncombe County, North Carolina. By 1840, 5 Creelmans officially resided in the U.S., 2 in Monroe, Michigan, 1 in Essex still, 1 in Monroe, New York, and 1 in Allegheny, Pennsylvania.

The 1850 U.S. Federal Census lists 42 Creelmans - 11 in "Monroe" (either Michigan or New York), 9 in Allegheny, 8 in Philadelphia, 7 in Essex, 2 in "Randolph", 1 in Hamilton County, Ohio and 1 in Wayne County, Michigan. 1860 reports 58 Creelmans with concentrations in Allegheny, "Suffolk", Washtenaw County, Michigan, "Pierce", Philadelphia, Monroe, Hamilton, and "Lee".

By 1920 there were 298 Creelmans reported in the federal census with the following concentrations: 29 in Philadelphia, 19 in Hamilton, Ohio, 18 in Middlesex, Massachusetts, 17 in Hartford, Connecticut, 17 in San Diego, 14 in New York, New York including 6 in Queens, 14 in Hennepin County, Minnesota, 9 in Providence, Rhode Island, 7 in Kings County, California, 6 in Monroe, New York, 6 in Mahoning County, Ohio, 6 in Allegheny, 6 in Skagit County, Washington, and 6 in Campbell County, Kentucky.

The 1930 Census shows concentrations of the 373 Creelmans listed in the same locales as well as 20 in Cook County, Illinois, 13 in Hudson County, New Jersey, and 11 in Essex County, New Jersey

== People with the surname ==
- Alice Creelman (1858–1952), American artist and art dealer
- Debra-Jean Creelman, musician, Mother Mother
- James Creelman, Canadian-born American journalist
- James Ashmore Creelman, Hollywood screenwriter, son of James and Alice
- Lyle Creelman, Chief Nursing Officer of the World Health Organization
- Samuel Creelman, Canadian politician from Nova Scotia
- Sharon Creelman, Canadian field hockey player and coach
- William J. Creelman, American Medal of Honor recipient

== People descended from Creelmans ==
- Angus Creelman Ree, Canadian politician

== Places named after a Creelman ==
- Creelman, Saskatchewan, named after a CPR surveyor named Creelman who surveyed the area
- Creelman Township, in the Ontario Nickel Belt
- Creelman Drive, in Dartmouth, Nova Scotia
- Creelman Street, at the campus of Mississippi State University in Starkville
- Creelman Avenue in Vancouver, British Columbia
- Creelman Hall at the University of Guelph, Ontario named after George Creelman above
