= Little Bass River, Nova Scotia =

Community in Nova Scotia, Canada

Coordinates: 45.400°N 63.808°W

Location of Little Bass River, Nova Scotia in Nova Scotia

Little Bass River is a sub-community in Colchester County, Nova Scotia, Canada. It forms the western portion the community of Bass River.

"Little Bass" as it is known locally, stretches along Trunk 2 from "Chipman's Hollow" in Bass River west to the neighbouring jurisdiction of Upper Economy, and north until it reaches the former community of Pleasant Hills. It takes its name from the river that meanders down from the Cobequid Hills, near Pleasant Hills Road, and empties into the Cobequid Bay between Starratt Road and Minas King Drive.

== Little Bass today ==
The year-round population of approximately 60 residents doubles in amount in the summer months when seasonal cottages are occupied.

The local economy employs residents in agriculture, landscaping, retail, auto repair, forestry, and blueberry production. Little Bass River is home to a growing population of retirees.

== History ==
The economy was traditionally focused on forestry, including harvesting various species of coniferous trees such as black spruce, red spruce, white spruce, balsam fir, and juniper, as well as several hardwood species such as poplar, silver maple, paper birch, and speckled alder.

During the height of industrial activity at the turn of the 20th century, Little Bass had an active timber harvest feeding a busy saw mill, as well as a shipping wharf for exporting timber and a general store.

Local shipbuilders constructed wood sailing ships, of which 8 vessels measured 100–300 feet in length, these being:

- Goldstream in 1874 (schooner)
- Compier in 1874 (half brig)
- Cashier in 1876 (double decker)
- Depositor in 1884 (double decker)
- Florence L.
- M.J. Kenny
- Modoc
- Minas King in 1918 (schooner)

The first inhabitants were nearly entirely of Ulster Scottish origins; their surnames included Creelman, Fulton, Lewis, O'Brien, Starratt or Starrit, and Wilson.
