= 22 Murders =

2022 non-fiction book by Paul Palango

- Author: Paul Palango
- Publisher: Random House Canada
- Publication date: 12 April 2022
- ISBN: 9781039001275

22 Murders: Investigating the Massacre, Cover-up, and Obstacles to Justice in Nova Scotia is a 2022 non-fiction book by Canadian writer Paul Palango. The book documents the 2020 Nova Scotia attacks and critiques the police response to the two day incident.

== Production ==
The book is written by Nova Scotia-based writer and former journalist and editor Paul Palango. Palango has written three previous books critical of the Royal Canadian Mounted Police (RCMP) and prior to publishing 22 Murders, he wrote several articles on the attacks, that were published in Maclean's, Halifax Examiner, and Frank.

The book was written following Palango's receipt of information from a concerned Orangeville resident who had been listening to the police communication via a radio scanner at the time of the attacks.

The book was published by Random House on April 12, 2022.

== Synopsis ==
The book documents the police response to Gabriel Wortman killing 22 people on the 18th and 19th April 2020, in Portapique. Palango presents the actions of authorities in a critical light, highlighting his perceptions of their failures. He is critical of both the immediate response to the killings and the subsequent investigation, which he describes as a "cover up". Criticism is levied at the RCMP for using Twitter rather than the phone-based Alert Ready system to warn nearby communities. Palango is also critical of the RCMP for not setting up roadblocks, and for their choice to seek assistance from a neighbouring provincial police force some hours away rather than the most proximate municipal police forces.

== Critical reception ==
The book was the third most popular non-fiction Canadian book in May 2022. Lawyer and writer Douglas J. Johnston, writing in the Winnipeg Free Press, praises Palango's research and analysis but also notes that the criticisms of the police are "largely circumstantial and conjectural".

== See also ==
- Literature of Nova Scotia
