= Five Islands, Nova Scotia =

Community in Nova Scotia, Canada

Coordinates: 45°24′43″N 64°02′13″W

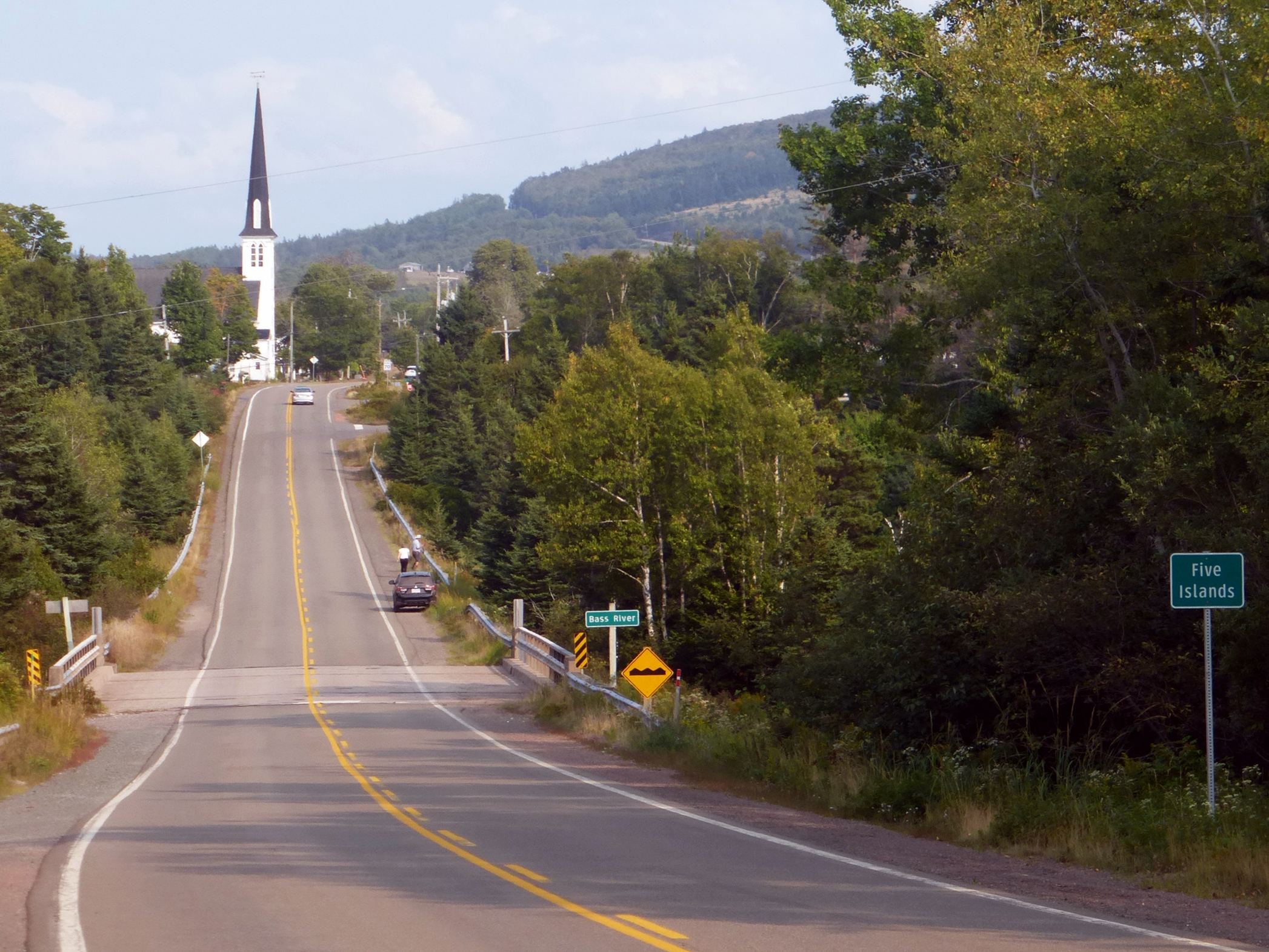
Five Islands NS, as seen from Trunk 2. The tall spire belongs to Peniel United Church.

Five Islands in upper central Nova Scotia

Five Islands is a rural community in Colchester County, Nova Scotia, Canada with a population of 316 located on the north shore of Minas Basin, home of the highest tides in the world. It is named after five small islands – Moose, Diamond, Long, Egg, and Pinnacle – located just off the coast. The islands are an exposed part of the North Mountain Basalt. Moose Island is in Colchester County. The remaining islands are in Cumberland County. Beyond Pinnacle Island is a seastack called Pinnacle Rock. Situated on Trunk 2, it is the largest community between Parrsboro to the east and Economy to the east.

The Five Islands Provincial Park includes Moose and Diamond Islands. Five Islands had a lighthouse in operation from 1914 to 1999. It was moved several times due to erosion. The lighthouse has since been preserved by a community group.

Native Mi'kmaq legend has it that the Five Islands were created when their god Glooscap threw the mud, sticks and stones at the giant beaver who dammed his medicine garden in Advocate. The mud, sticks and stones that formed the islands are said to have trapped the beaver in one of the islands and turned it into gold.

== Economy ==
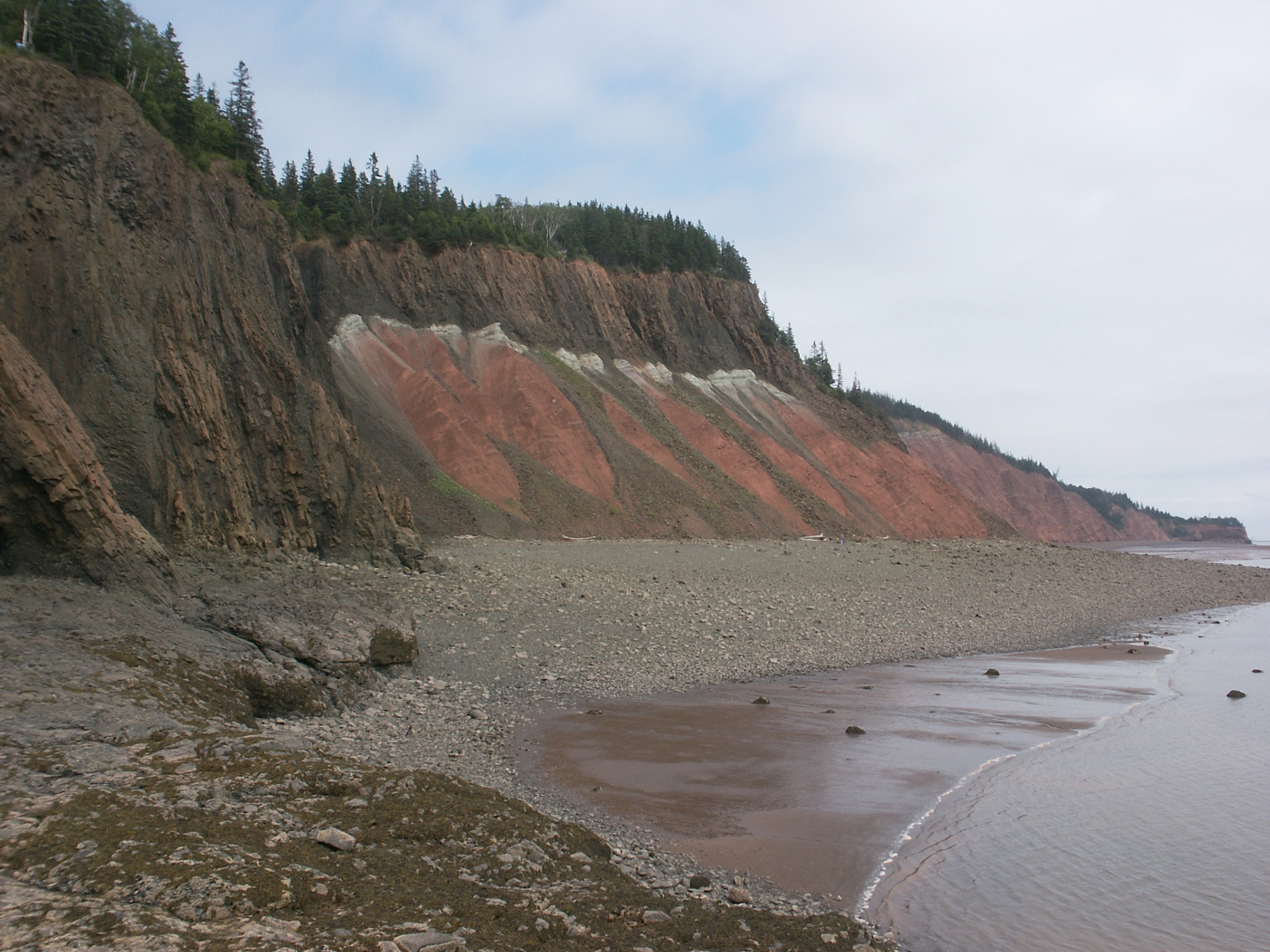
View from Old Wife Point, Five Islands Provincial Park, to the southeast, down the southwestern foot of Economy Mountain.

The main sources of income in Five Islands are from natural resources including blueberries, fishing, and clam harvesting and processing. Tourism is also important, with several restaurants and campgrounds in the area.

In the late 1800s there was a large barite mine, (called "barytes" at the time by the locals) on the Bass River called the Duncan/Eureka Mine. The barite was used in the Henderson & Potts (later Brandram-Henderson) Paint Factory, located in Lower Five Islands. Later, barite was shipped to Halifax and the United States for its use in paint manufacturing.

== The five islands ==
The islands and the park are composed of basalt resting on top of Triassic age sandstone. The boundary between the two formations runs through the islands. Moose and Pinnacle show both sandstone and basalt, Diamond and Long are all basalt, and Egg is all sandstone. The basalts contain minerals that are interesting to rockhounds including agate, zeolites such as stilbite and gmelinite, and calcite.

On the mainland, slightly inland from the community, the land rises quickly. This is the Cobequid Fault. Barite and calcite are found in some of the ravines.

=== Moose Island ===
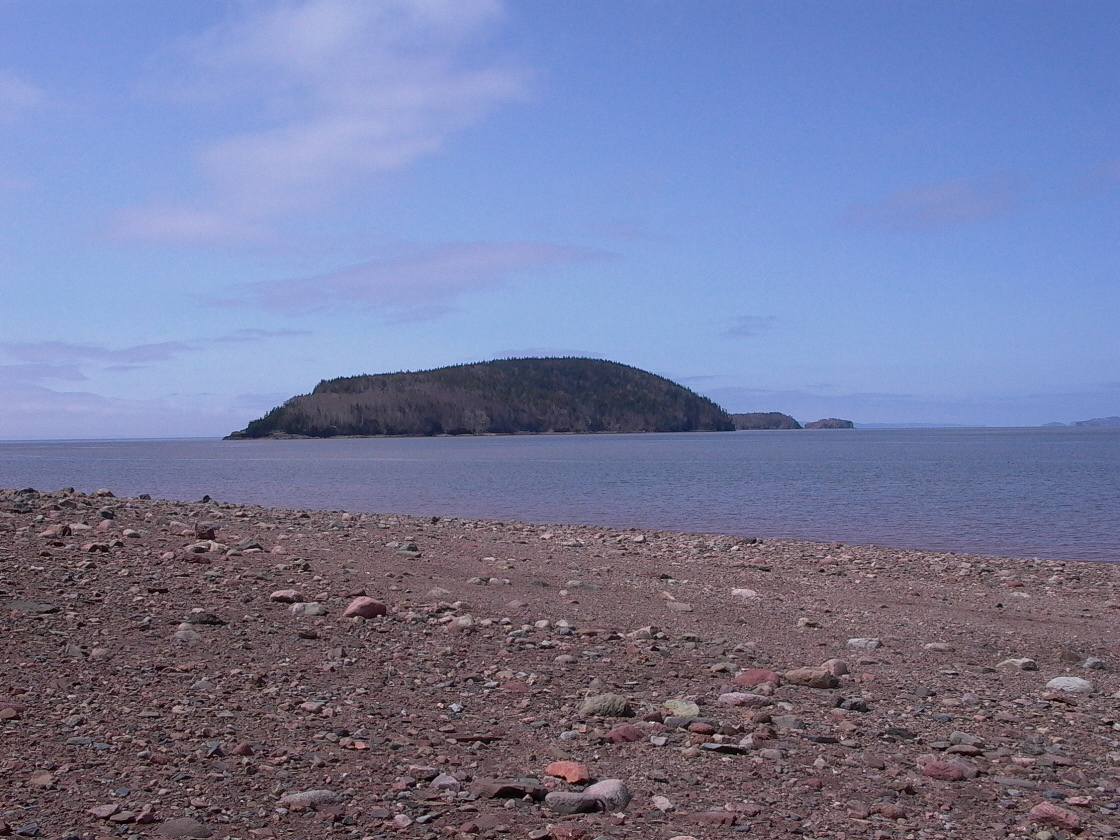
Moose Island as seen from Five Islands provincial park

Seniors living in the community recall youthful memories of Moose Island deriving its name from stories of the island having supported a moose herd until shortly after settlers inhabited the surrounding areas. There are other legends relating to this island as well but this seems to be the most laudable to many who have lived there many years ago.

Moose Island was the only one of the five ever to be inhabited and carries with it the most tangible tale of intrigue. Early in the 1800s, John Ruff, a Scotsman, settled this outpost with his family. He cleared much of the forest and established a modest mixed farm, supplying the coastal village with produce, wood and charcoal. He was reputed to be a hard, cruel person, and rumors circulated that he abused his wife and children. When he died a violent death, suspicions arose that he had been murdered by his son. A controversial trial led to acquittal, and afterwards the family moved to the mainland, carrying the unresolved mystery with them. Legend has John Ruff's spirit stalking the long overgrown fields during misty, moonless nights in search of vengeance. On a dark night on the beach, some people have said that they could see a light that walks the shore of the island.

=== Long Island ===
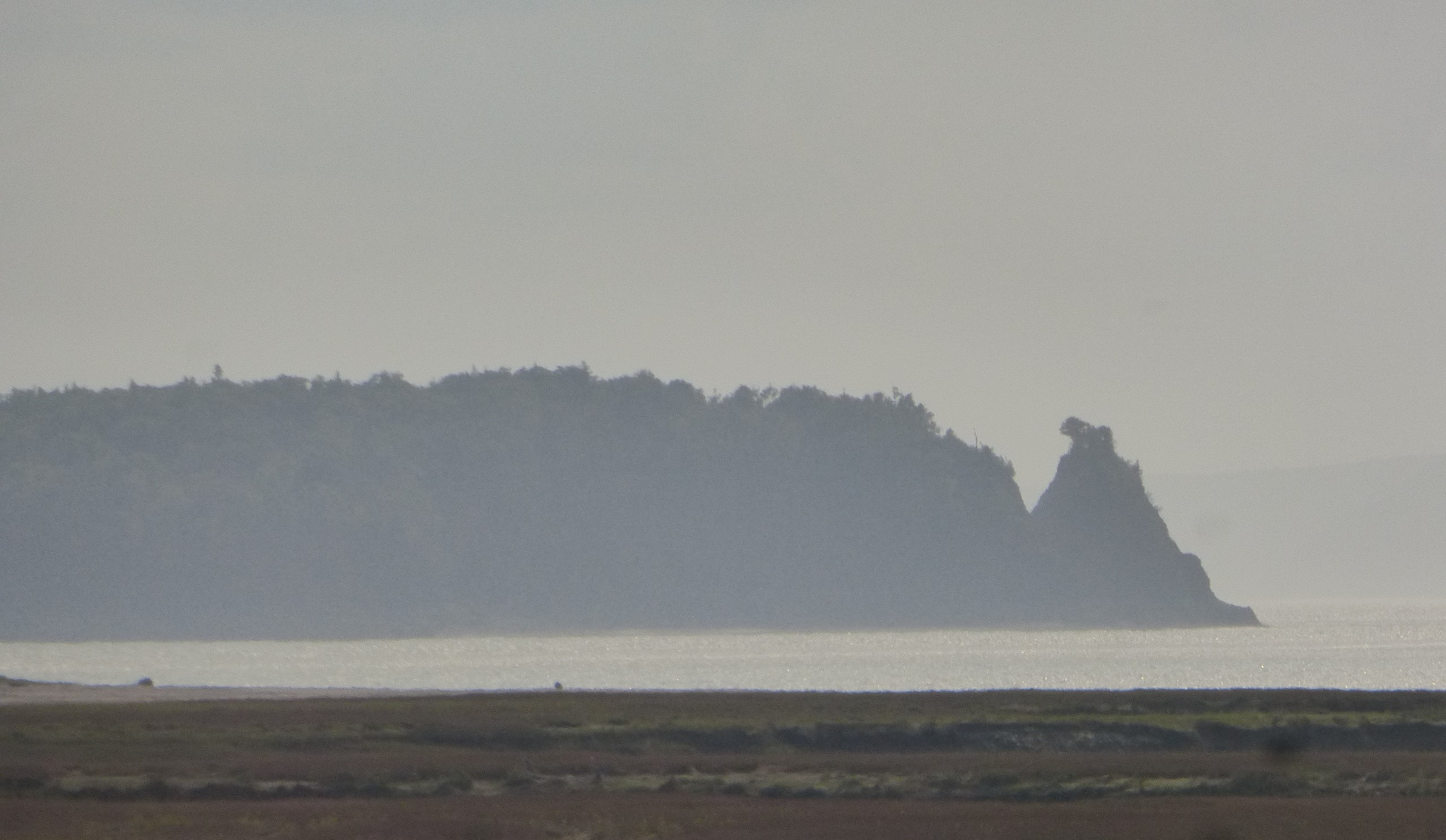
Long Island, one of the Five Islands

In 2003 Long Island was purchased by Dick Lemon, who wanted to build on its top, 200 ft (60 m) above the sea bed, a retreat for artists, writers, musicians and academics. The cliffs prohibited access except by a rope assisted scramble up a muddy draw. The sea, being in the Bay of Fundy's tide reach, is 30 to 50 ft (9 to 20 m) deep at high tide and empty at low tide, so boat access to the island is limited each day to a four-hour window, namely the high tide during daylight. When the tide is low, people on Long Island can walk or run on the sea bed for miles. Taking advantage of the extreme tides, Lemon in 2007 began a charity event called Not Since Moses, a 5K and 10K run from Long and Moose Islands through the sea bed to shore. Meanwhile, beginning in 2004, local workers began creating a retreat on Long Island. A helicopter carried heavy equipment including a tent for workers to live in during the construction (since they could not practically travel daily to and from the island). Then, to begin, locals hung from the cliffs and pounded in supports for 194 steps rising from the sea to the island's top. A lift was designed by Dennis Ross, the project manager, who had retired as a corrections officer at the nearby prison in Springhill. The locally built lift ultimately hauled 25 tons of gravel, about 40,000 board feet (94 m^{3}) of lumber, and another 20 tons of furniture and furnishings and all else needed for a three bedroom two bath main house plus four sleeping cabins. These include a miniature lighthouse, a cabin built in the shape of a river boat edged over a cliff, a perch cabin on a promontory and a caretakers cabin. Ross oversaw the construction, the drilling with a specialty rig of two wells and the installation of a solar and generator power system for the main house which enjoys all the comforts of a modern home including full kitchen. The retreat is used May through October by users such as the Nova Scotia College of Arts and Design, Ships Company Theatre, St. Mary's University and various groups which have included private tourists.

During the night of 19 October 2015, the hole that had been in Long Island collapsed.

=== Pinnacle Island ===
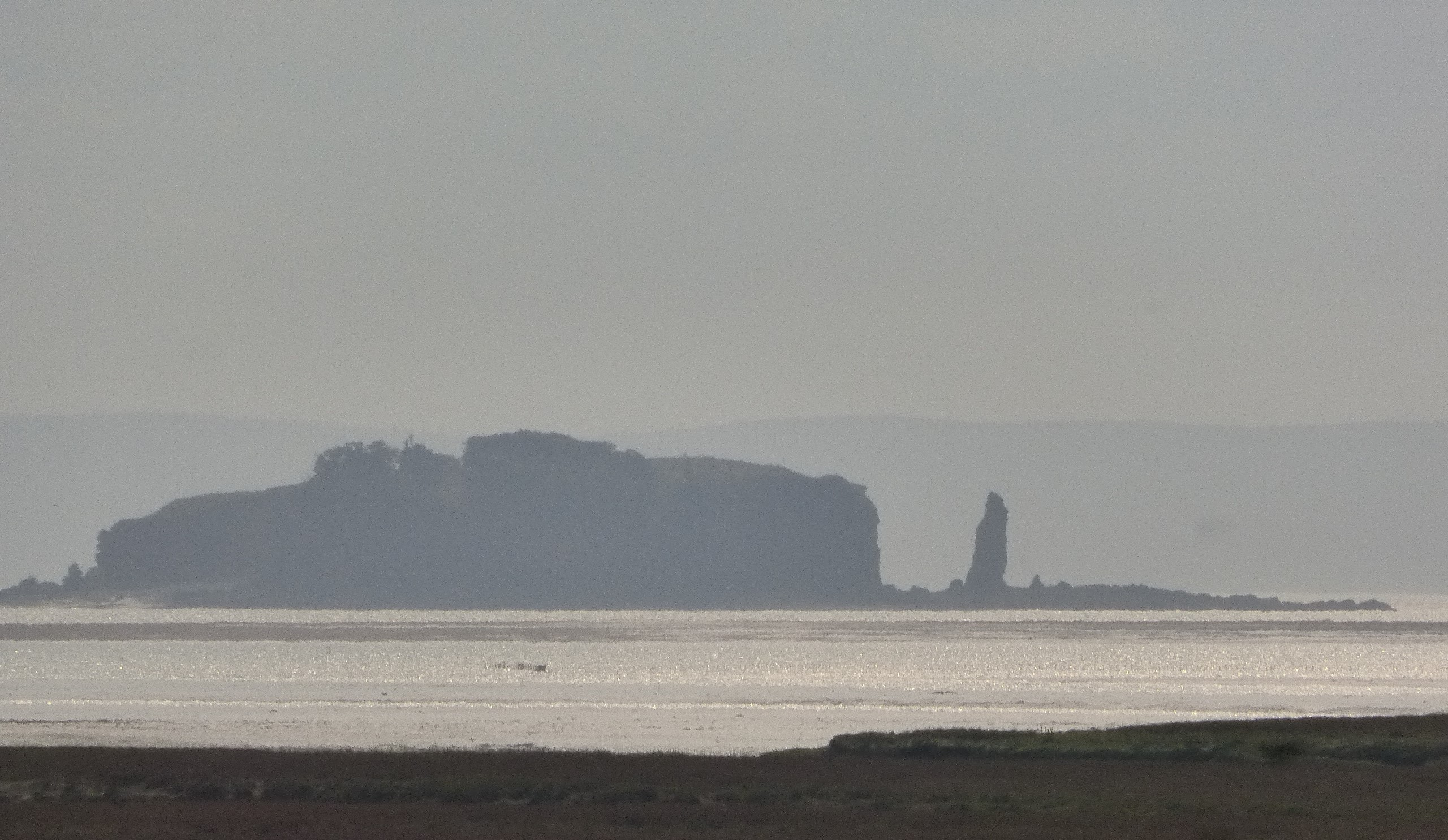
Pinnacle Island, one of the Five Islands on Minas Basin NS

Pinnacle Island is home to a colony of gulls.

=== Diamond Island ===
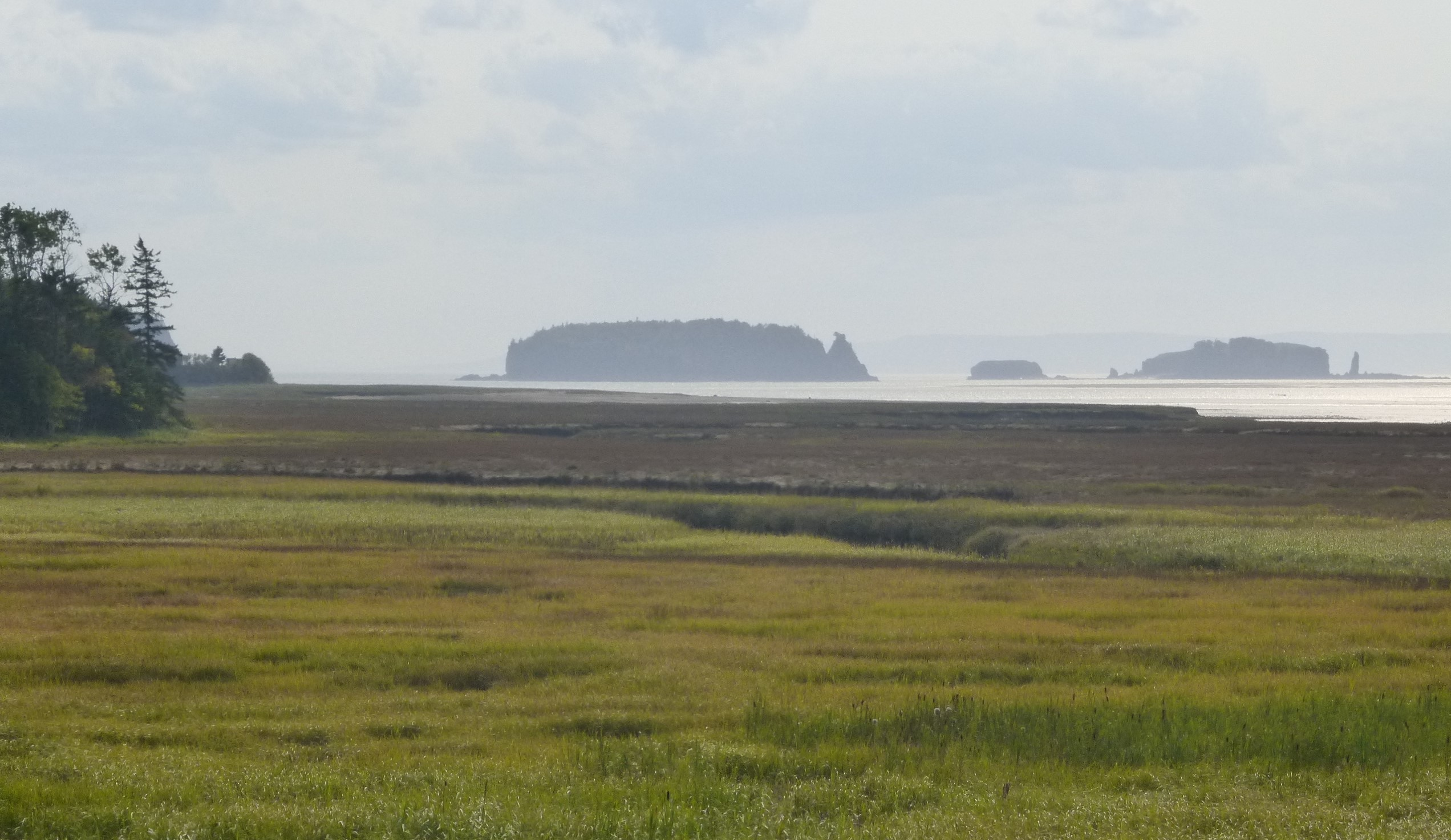
Diamond Island, which lies between Long and Pinnacle Islands, is the smallest of the Five Islands

== Lighthouse ==
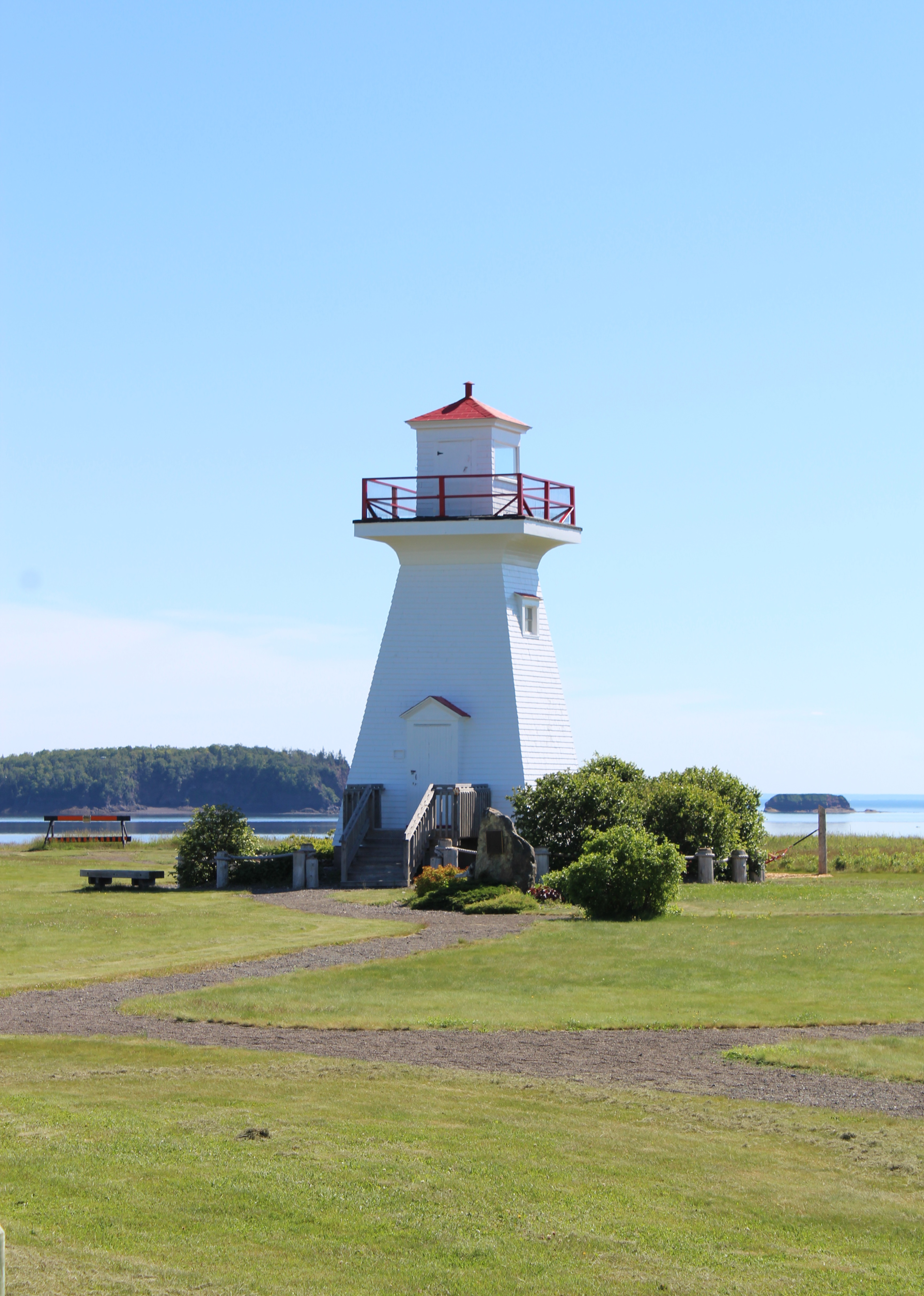
The Five Islands Lighthouse

Five Islands is home to one lighthouse at Five Islands Lighthouse Park. The existing tower was originally built in 1914, and later moved in 1952 and 1957. Having deteriorated over the years, the tower was saved from being demolished by the Five Islands Lighthouse Preservation Society and moved to the Sand Point campground as a tourist attraction in 1996. In 2008, the Five Islands Lighthouse was moved to a nearby municipal park, becoming the focal point of said park.

== Notable people ==
- Purdy Crawford (born Five Islands 1931, died Toronto 2014), lawyer, business executive, philanthropist.
