= Paul Palango =

Canadian writer and retired journalist

- Born: 1950 (age 75–76); Ontario, Canada
- Occupations: Author, newspaper editor, investigative journalist
- Notable work: 22 Murders (2022 book)

Paul Palango (born 1950) is a Canadian author and investigative journalist. Palango worked as a journalist and editor for The Hamilton Spectator and The Globe and Mail. He has written four non-fiction books about policing in Canada, including 22 Murders.

== Early life ==
Palango was born in 1950 in Ontario, Canada.

== Career ==
In the 1970s he worked for The Hamilton Spectator before moving to The Globe and Mail in 1977 and remaining there until 1990 when he retired as an editor. Palango is noted for his reporting on authority figures including the Canadian police, Canadian Security Intelligence Service, the Canadian media, and business leaders. In 2000, he opened a glass art business in Lunenburg, Nova Scotia.

He returned to writing, publishing 22 Murders in 2022, his critical account of the Royal Canadian Mounted Police response to the 2020 Nova Scotia attacks. The book was the second on the Toronto Star's list of bestselling non-fiction in Canada in April 2022.

The Georgia Straight editor, Charlie Smith, described Palango as "one of Canada's last remaining investigative reporters." in August 2022.

In June 2025, Palango released a follow-up book to 22 Murders, titled Anatomy of a Cover-Up.

== Books ==
- Above the Law, 1994, McClelland & Stewart, ISBN 978-0-7710-6905-5
- The Last Guardians: The Crisis in the RCMP - and Canada, 1998, McClelland & Stewart, ISBN 978-0-7710-6906-2
- Dispersing the Fog: Inside the Secret World of Ottawa and the RCMP, 2008, Key Porter Books, ISBN 978-1-55470-042-4
- 22 Murders, 2022, Random House Canada, ISBN 978-1-0390-0127-5
- Anatomy of a Cover-Up: The Truth about the RCMP and the Nova Scotia Massacres, 2025, Random House Canada, ISBN 978-1039010123

== Personal life ==
Palango lives in Nova Scotia.
