= Dominion Chair Company =

Canadian furniture company

Dominion Chair Company is the wooden furniture manufacturing company that operated from 1860 to 1989 in Bass River, Nova Scotia, Canada.

== History ==
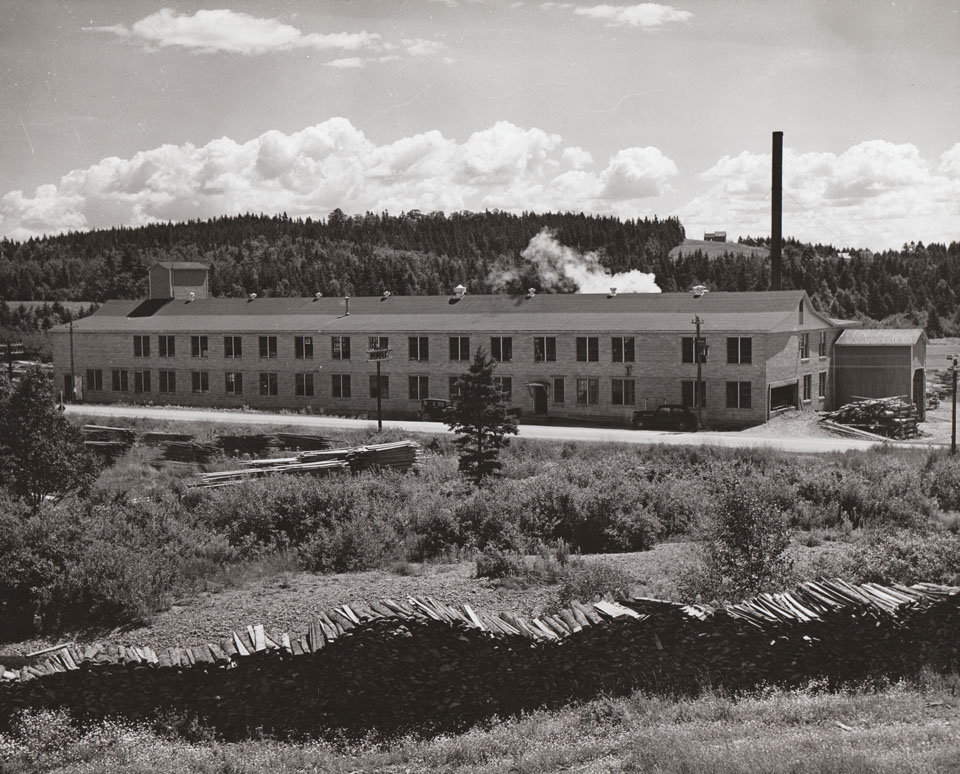
The chair factory in Bass River

In 1860, George and William Fulton, brothers and great-grandsons of the first settler of Bass River, "Judge" James Fulton, built a small sawmill in Bass River and began manufacturing chairs and other furniture. In 1870, the brothers disagreed about moving the business to Truro, and George wound up buying his brother's share of the company. George continued managing the business in Bass River, purchasing and merging with the Acadia Chair Factory to found a joint stock company in 1876, naming it Union Furniture and Merchandise Company.

Fires damaged the factory and halted production in 1885 and 1892, but the factory was rebuilt and business continued. The name Dominion Chair Company Limited was adopted in 1903. George Fulton's son, Suther B. Fulton, took over the business when his father retired in 1888.

Operations continued through at least four devastating fires and a large explosion. However, a final fire in 1989 damaged the factory irreparably. The company was struggling financially, and two failed attempts at securing government funding to construct a new factory led to the company declaring bankruptcy in 1991.

== Historical site ==
The Dominion Chair Company General Store, built in 1890, still operates in Bass River as a store and historical site.
