= Gary Saunders =

Canadian writer (born 1935)

Gary L. Saunders
- Born: Gary Lloyd Saunders; 1935 (age 90–91); Clarke's Head, Newfoundland, Canada
- Occupations: Writer; artist; forester
- Notable work: My Life With Trees (2015)
- Awards: Evelyn Richardson Award

Gary Lloyd Saunders (born 1935) is a Canadian writer, artist, and forester from Newfoundland. He won the Evelyn Richardson Award in 2016 for his book My Life With Trees.

== Early life and education ==
Gary L. Saunders was born in 1935 in Clarke's Head, Newfoundland. He attended the Newfoundland Academy of Art in 1953, followed by the University of New Brunswick, where he earned a Bachelor of Science in forestry in 1959. After graduating from the University of New Brunswick, Saunders returned to Newfoundland for some time where he began working in forestry and teaching dendrology at Memorial University. He subsequently moved to Sackville, New Brunswick and attended Mount Allison University, graduating with a Bachelor of Fine Arts in 1965.

== Career ==
After graduating from Mount Allison, Saunders moved to Truro, Nova Scotia, and began working with the Nova Scotia Department of Lands and Forests as a writer and illustrator. He regularly travelled to his childhood home in Newfoundland and created abstract landscape paintings, which have been featured in exhibitions across Canada. Some of his paintings are held in the collection of The Rooms Provincial Art Gallery.

Saunders was inducted into the Forestry Hall of Fame by the Nova Scotia Forest Technicians Association in 2005. In 2016, he was awarded the Evelyn Richardson Award for his book My Life With Trees.

== Publications ==
- — (1979). The Brook and the Woodcutter. Department of Lands and Forests. Illustrated by Joy Laking. Halifax, N.S.: Government of Nova Scotia. ISBN 978-0-8887-1007-9.
- — (1982). The Man Who Couldn't Stop Sneezing. Department of Lands and Forests. Illustrated by Joy Laking. Halifax, N.S.: Government of Nova Scotia. ISBN 978-0-8887-1025-3.
- — (1987). Rattles and Steadies: Memoirs of a Gander River Man. St. John's, NL: Breakwater Books. ISBN 978-0-9195-1973-2.
- — (1989). Alder Music: A Celebration of Our Environment. St. John's, NL: Breakwater Books. ISBN 978-0-9209-1148-8.
- — (1992). Wildlife of Atlantic Canada & New England. Halifax, N.S.: Nimbus Publishing. ISBN 978-1-5510-9008-5.
- — (1992). September Christmas. St. John's, NL: Breakwater Books. ISBN 978-1-5508-1013-4.
- — (1994). Doctor Olds of Twillingate: Portrait of an American Surgeon in Newfoundland. St. John's, NL: Breakwater Books. ISBN 978-1-5508-1092-9.
- — (1996). Trees of Nova Scotia: A Guide to the Native and Exotic Species. Halifax, N.S.: Nimbus Publishing. ISBN 978-1-5510-9123-5.
- — (1998). Doctor When You're Sick You're Not Well. St. John's, NL: Breakwater Books. ISBN 978-1-5508-1142-1.
- — (2001). Discover Nova Scotia: The Ultimate Nature Guide. Halifax, N.S.: Nimbus Publishing. ISBN 978-1-5510-9242-3.
- — (2002). So Much Weather!: Facts, Phenomena And Weather Lore from Atlantic Canada. Halifax, N.S.: Nimbus Publishing. ISBN 978-1-5510-9382-6.
- — (2015). My Life With Trees. Kentville, N.S.: Gaspereau Press. ISBN 978-1-5544-7151-5.
- — (2022). Earthkeeping: Love Notes for Tough Times. Fredericton, N.B.: Goose Lane Editions. ISBN 978-1-7731-0269-6.
