= Purdy Crawford =

Canadian businessman (1931–2014)

- Born: 7 November 1931; Five Islands, Nova Scotia
- Died: 12 August 2014 (aged 82); Toronto, Ontario
- Education: Mount Allison University (BA '52); Dalhousie University (LLB '55); Harvard University (LLM '56)
- Spouse: Beatrice Corbett (m. 1950)

Harold Purdy Crawford, CC QC (7 November 1931 – 12 August 2014) was a Canadian lawyer and businessman.

== Education ==
Born in Five Islands, Nova Scotia, he received a Bachelor of Arts degree from Mount Allison University in 1952, a bachelor of laws degree from Dalhousie Law School in 1955, and a master of laws from Harvard Law School in 1956. He was called to the Bar of Nova Scotia in 1956 and the Bar of Ontario in 1958. He was created a Queen's Counsel in 1968.

== Law career ==
In 1956, he joined the law firm of Osler, Hoskin & Harcourt as a student. Specializing in corporate and commercial law, he became an associate lawyer in 1958, partner in 1962, and a senior partner from 1970 to 1985. He articled with Roland Ritchie in Halifax and studied labour law at Harvard with Archibald Cox, best known as the Watergate special prosecutor. From 1964 to 1968, he was a special lecturer at the Osgoode Hall Law School of York University and taught at the University of Toronto Law School from 1969 to 1971. In the early 1960s he worked with the Kimber Committee which recommended a new securities law for Ontario in 1965. He was involved in drafting the legislation to implement the Kimber recommendations. The new Securities Act was enacted in Ontario and subsequently in other provinces, and is the foundation of Canadian securities law.

He re-joined Osler as counsel in 2000.

== Business career ==
In 1985, he became president and chief operating officer of Imasco Ltd., becoming CEO in 1986, and chairman, president and CEO in 1987. He retired as CEO in 1995 and as chairman OF Imasco Ltd. in 2000.

He was the chairman of the Atlantic Institute for Market Studies (AIMS), chancellor of Mount Allison University and chairman of AT&T Canada. He was a corporate director for Canadian National Railway and was a member of the board of the Maple Leaf Foods as well as governor of the University of Waterloo.

He was chairman of the Ontario Government's Crawford Panel on a Single Canadian Securities Regulator. Crawford acted as the lead negotiator for resolution of the Canadian financial institutions' crisis in asset-backed commercial paper (ABCP), which was caused by the collapse in the subprime mortgage market in the United States in 2007.

Crawford sat on the boards of several large Canadian companies. He was chair of the Pan-Canadian Investors Committee for Third-Party Structured Asset Backed Commercial Paper; was the former chair of the Five-Year Review Committee appointed to review securities legislation in Ontario and was also the chair of the Securities Industry Committee on Analyst Standards. In 1996, he became an officer of the Order of Canada. He was inducted into the Business Hall of Fame of Nova Scotia in 1997 and became a fellow of the Institute of Corporate Directors in 1999. In 2000, he was inducted into the Canadian Business Hall of Fame and named Ivey Business Leader of the Year. In April 2003 was named one of the five 2002 Public Policy Forum honorees and in October was named the Conference Board of Canada's 2003 honorary associate. In 2007, he received the Yee Hong Golden Achievement Award and was honoured as a Champion of Public Education by The Learning Partnership.

== Targeting young non-smokers ==
In 2000, the Globe and Mail obtained documents showing that, in spite of tobacco industry denials that it focused on selling its products to young non-smokers, Crawford supported Imperial Tobacco's efforts to target them in its marketing campaigns. "Imperial Tobacco Ltd. has always focused its efforts on new smokers, believing that early impressions tend to stay with them throughout their lives," Crawford privately told executives of Imperial's parent company in 1989. He added that his company "clearly dominates the young adult market today, and stands to prosper as these smokers age, and as it maintains its highly favourable youthful preference."

== Death ==
He died on August 12, 2014, at St. Michael's Hospital in Toronto. Services were held at Metropolitan United Church in Toronto, and at Peniel United in Five Islands, in August and October respectively.

== Honours ==
In 1996, he was made an officer of the Order of Canada "as the quintessential corporate philanthropist" and "as a caring and sensitive leader". In 2007, he was promoted to companion of the Order of Canada. In 1997 he was inducted into the Nova Scotia Business Hall of Fame and the Canadian Business Hall of Fame in 2000.

The Purdy Crawford Teaching Centre at Mount Allison University is named in his honour. Dalhousie University's faculty of law established the Purdy Crawford Chair in Business Law in his honour. He received an honorary degree from University of New Brunswick in 2010.

In 2008, Purdy Crawford received an honorary doctorate of letters from Cape Breton University and as part of a Cape Breton University Honorary Degree ceremony in 2010 at Membertou First Nation was honoured with the title of Honorary Chieftain of Membertou by Chief Terrance Paul when he was given the title of Chief Rising Tide.

Also in 2010, Cape Breton University announced the creation of the Purdy Crawford Chair in Aboriginal Business Studies, named in honour of Shannon School of Business Advisory Board member, Mr. Purdy Crawford. The research chair was developed to promote interest among Canada's Indigenous people in the study of business at the post-secondary level, while undertaking pure and applied research specific to Aboriginal communities.

== Bibliography ==
- "Canadian Who's Who 1997 entry". University of Toronto Press.
- "Purdy Crawford". Atlantic Institute for Market Studies. Archived from the original on May 8, 2006.

== See also ==
- List of University of Waterloo people
