= Judge Fulton =

Canadian politician

James "Judge" Fulton (c. 1739 – 25 September 1826) was a justice of the peace, judge, surveyor, politician, and founder of the village of Bass River, Nova Scotia.

Born in Belfast, Fulton migrated from Ulster to New England around 1760, where he worked as a surveyor. Arriving in Nova Scotia in 1765, he settled by 1767 in the Londonderry Township, an area settled primarily by Ulster families since 1761. He was appointed JP for the district of Colchester, which was then still part of Halifax County. He was one of the first land grantees of the township. In 1791, he was appointed a judge of the Inferior Court of Common Pleas for Colchester and in 1793 was commissioned as captain of the local militia regiment. He also made the first complete survey of the township and its villages.

Fulton was elected to the 8th General Assembly of Nova Scotia, representing rural Halifax County from 1799-1806. He joined Edward Mortimer of Pictou and William Cottnam Tonge of Hants County to form a "country party" that opposed powerful Halifax merchants allied with then Lieutenant Governor, Sir John Wentworth and the Privy Council. The country party took three of four Halifax County seats contested, including Fulton who finished third. (At the time all candidates campaigned county-wide with the top four finishers receiving the four available seats.)

As a Member of the Assembly, Fulton however voted independently on matters and would at times side with court party members. He served on Assembly committees, particularly ones dealing with road or bridge construction. Fulton spent the remainder of his days a farmer on his Bass River homestead until his death. He and his wife Margaret (née Campbell) had seven sons and seven or eight daughters. His great-grandson George Fulton founded Dominion Chair Company in 1875.

== Bibliography ==
- Tulloch, Judith (1987). "Fulton, James". In Halpenny, Francess G. (ed.). Dictionary of Canadian Biography. Vol. VI (1821–1835) (online ed.). University of Toronto Press.
- Elliott, Shirley B. (1984). The Legislative Assembly of Nova Scotia, 1758-1983: a biographical directory (PDF). Halifax: Province of Nova Scotia. p. 258&78. ISBN 0-88871-050-X.
