= Lyle Creelman =

Canadian nurse (1908–2007)

Lyle Creelman

Lyle Morrison Creelman, OC (August 14, 1908 – 2007) was a Canadian nurse. She was the Chief Nursing Officer of the World Health Organization from 1954 to 1968. In 1971, she was awarded the Order of Canada.

== Early life and education ==
Creelman was born on August 14, 1908, in Upper Stewiacke, Nova Scotia, the youngest of eleven children as well as the only child of a second marriage. She is a cousin of George Creelman, who was former president of the Ontario Agricultural College. At a young age, she planned to pursue a career in medicine. However, after her father's death, she decided to initially become a teacher in order to earn enough money to support her education.

She attended Vancouver Normal School in British Columbia. In 1936, she graduated from University of British Columbia with a degree in public health nursing. After being awarded a Rockefeller Fellowship, she studied at Columbia University in New York City, graduating in 1939 with a master's degree.

== Career ==
During the Second World War, she lived in Vancouver, where she worked for the Metropolitan Health Department of Vancouver and helped develop nursing services based in the local community. Working with interned Japanese families, Creelman gained additional insight into other cultures.

Near the conclusion of the war, Creelman became chief nurse of occupied Germany's British zone, hired by the United Nations Relief and Rehabilitation Administration. Working there, she experienced challenges, including working in difficult conditions such as overcrowded concentration camps where typhus infections had been deliberately introduced by the German military.

After returning to British Columbia, she co-authored the Baillie-Creelman Report, assessing the status of Canadian public health nursing and making recommendations. In 1949, she began working for the World Health Organization as a nursing consultant. In 1954, she was named Chief Nursing Officer.

=== Awards ===
Creelman was awarded the Honorary Doctor of Laws from UNB (1963), the Canada Centennial Medal (1967), Order of Canada (1971) and Honorary Doctor of Science Degree from the University of British Columbia (1992).
