= Upper Stewiacke =

Community in Nova Scotia, Canada

- Location within Nova Scotia
- Coordinates: 45.13°N 62.59°W
- Country: Canada
- Province: Nova Scotia
- Founded: 1783

Population
  - Total: 1,200
- Time zone: AST

Upper Stewiacke is an unincorporated community in the Canadian province of Nova Scotia, located in Colchester County.

Upper Stewiacke can be reached by road via Route 289. Upper Stewiacke was founded in 1783 by Matthew Johnson, son of James Johnson, a Grantee of Truro, Nova Scotia. Johnson's supplies had come from Truro, some 20 miles away. In 1983, a special event and reenactment was held to mark the 200th Anniversary of the arrival of Matthew Johnson and his wife Ruth (née Fisher).

== Notable residents ==
- Lyle Creelman (1908–1997), the first Canadian nurse to work for the World Health Organization.
- James F. Ellis, physician and politician

== Climate ==
Climate data for Upper Stewiacke, 1991–2020 normals, extremes 1915–present
Month	Jan	Feb	Mar	Apr	May	Jun	Jul	Aug	Sep	Oct	Nov	Dec	Year
Record high °C (°F)	16.5 (61.7)	16.7 (62.1)	25.7 (78.3)	28.8 (83.8)	34.4 (93.9)	34.4 (93.9)	35.0 (95.0)	36.1 (97.0)	33.3 (91.9)	30.5 (86.9)	22.9 (73.2)	17.8 (64.0)	36.1 (97.0)
Mean daily maximum °C (°F)	−0.9 (30.4)	−0.2 (31.6)	3.6 (38.5)	9.5 (49.1)	16.0 (60.8)	21.2 (70.2)	25.1 (77.2)	24.9 (76.8)	20.7 (69.3)	14.1 (57.4)	8.1 (46.6)	2.7 (36.9)	12.1 (53.8)
Daily mean °C (°F)	−6.3 (20.7)	−5.8 (21.6)	−1.6 (29.1)	3.9 (39.0)	9.6 (49.3)	14.7 (58.5)	18.7 (65.7)	18.3 (64.9)	14.1 (57.4)	8.3 (46.9)	3.4 (38.1)	−2.0 (28.4)	6.3 (43.3)
Mean daily minimum °C (°F)	−11.6 (11.1)	−11.3 (11.7)	−6.9 (19.6)	−1.7 (28.9)	3.2 (37.8)	8.1 (46.6)	12.0 (53.6)	11.5 (52.7)	7.5 (45.5)	2.5 (36.5)	−1.3 (29.7)	−6.6 (20.1)	0.5 (32.9)
Record low °C (°F)	−41.1 (−42.0)	−38.9 (−38.0)	−30.5 (−22.9)	−26.7 (−16.1)	−8.3 (17.1)	−4.4 (24.1)	−1.7 (28.9)	−1.7 (28.9)	−7.2 (19.0)	−10.0 (14.0)	−24.4 (−11.9)	−36.0 (−32.8)	−41.1 (−42.0)
Average precipitation mm (inches)	115.8 (4.56)	100.3 (3.95)	107.4 (4.23)	91.6 (3.61)	94.8 (3.73)	96.9 (3.81)	88.4 (3.48)	95.0 (3.74)	106.0 (4.17)	125.2 (4.93)	122.5 (4.82)	132.7 (5.22)	1,267.8 (49.91)
Average rainfall mm (inches)	66.2 (2.61)	59.2 (2.33)	79.4 (3.13)	88.1 (3.47)	98.4 (3.87)	98.4 (3.87)	94.6 (3.72)	94.4 (3.72)	113.6 (4.47)	109.9 (4.33)	122.7 (4.83)	90.7 (3.57)	1,115.5 (43.92)
Average snowfall cm (inches)	71.4 (28.1)	53.5 (21.1)	45.5 (17.9)	13.3 (5.2)	0.5 (0.2)	0.0 (0.0)	0.0 (0.0)	0.0 (0.0)	0.0 (0.0)	0.1 (0.0)	13.2 (5.2)	50.6 (19.9)	248.1 (97.7)
Source: Environment Canada (rain, snow 1981–2010)
