= James Creelman =

Canadian-American writer

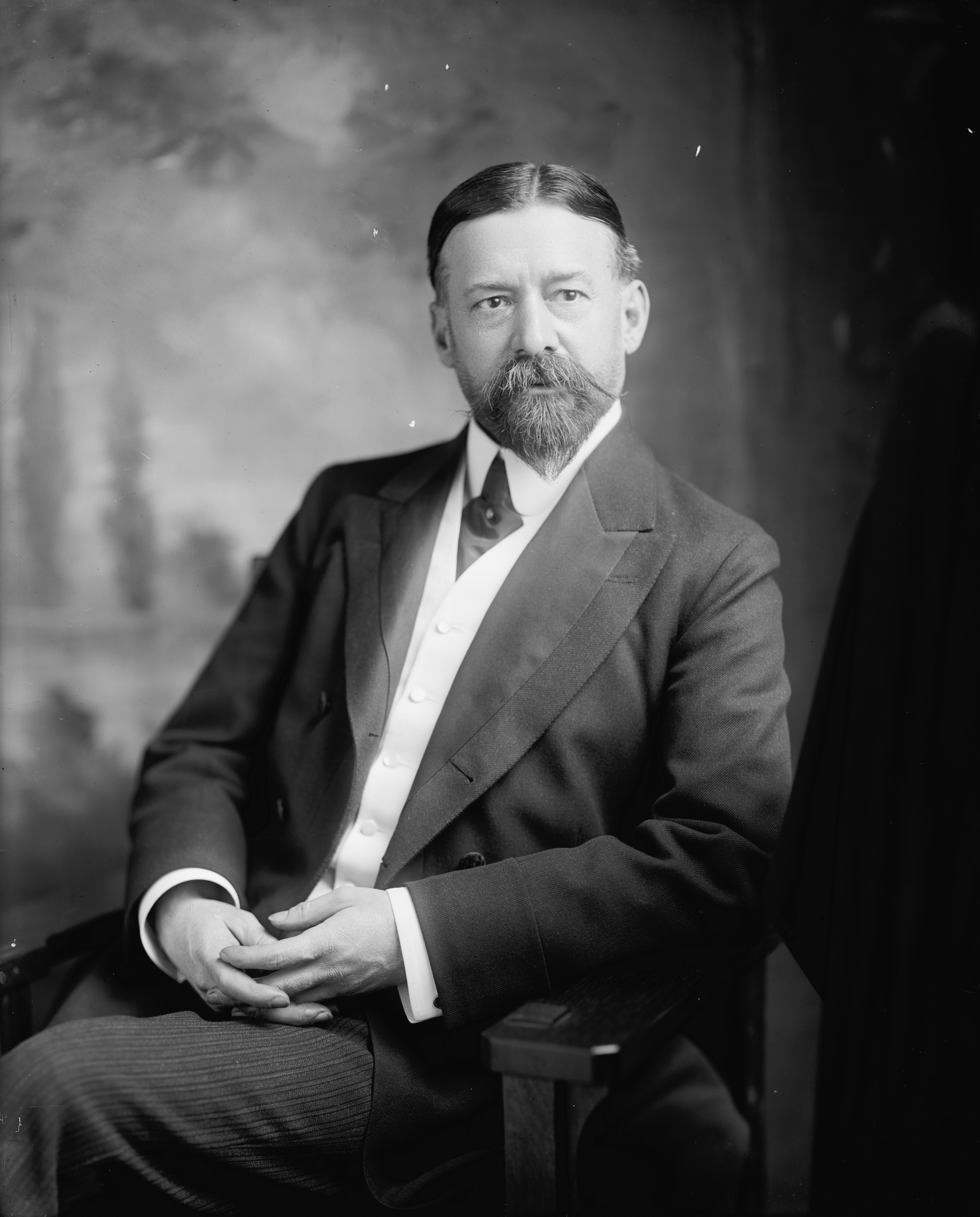
James Creelman

James Creelman (November 12, 1859 – February 12, 1915) was a Canadian-American writer famous for securing a 1908 interview for Pearson's Magazine with Mexican president Porfirio Díaz, in which the strongman said that he would not run for the presidency in the 1910 elections. The interview set off a frenzy of political activity in Mexico over the presidential elections and succession of power. In the words of historian Howard F. Cline, the "Creelman Interview marks a major turning point in the genesis of the Mexican Revolution." Creelman is often cited as a central reporter during the height of yellow journalism.

== Biography ==
=== Early life ===
He was born in Montreal, Province of Canada, the son of a boiler inspector, Matthew Creelman, and homemaker, Martha (née) Dunwoodie.

=== Career ===
In 1872, Creelman moved to New York City, where his interest in literature and law attracted the patronage of Thomas De Witt Talmage and Republican party boss Roscoe Conkling. His first job was in the print shop of the Episcopalian newspaper Church and State. He later moved to the print shop of the Brooklyn Eagle. By 1876, he joined the New York Herald as a reporter.

Creelman traveled extensively to find stories and was unafraid to take on great personal risk in their pursuit. He joined adventurer and showman Paul Boyton on his treks across the Yellowstone River and Mississippi River, dodged bullets reporting on the feud between the Hatfields and McCoys and interviewed Sitting Bull. He also interviewed Mexican President Porfirio Diaz, wherein Diaz stated he would not run for reelection in 1910 to allow new leadership for Mexico, a promise he did not keep and that in part led to the Mexican Revolution.

After stints at several other newspapers, including the Paris Herald, the Evening Telegram, and magazines Illustrated American and Cosmopolitan, Creelman landed at Joseph Pulitzer's New York World in 1894, where he accompanied the Japanese Army to cover the Sino-Japanese War. Creelman's sensational reportage of the Japanese seizure of Port Arthur and the accompanying massacre of its Chinese defenders by the victorious Japanese army garnered tremendous attention and put him in greater demand as a reporter.

A significant assignment for Creelman came in 1896, on a trip to Cuba to report on tensions brewing between the island nation and Spain. By 1897, William Randolph Hearst had recruited Creelman to his newspaper, the New York Journal, and assigned Creelman to cover the war between Cuba and Spain, which broke out in 1898.

In his 1901, book On the Great Highway: The Wanderings and Adventures of a Special Correspondent, Creelman quoted Hearst as telling artist Frederic Remington "You furnish the pictures, and I'll furnish the war." (Hearst's descendants adamantly deny this claim.)

Creelman was an open advocate for Cuba in its war against Spain, and like many of his war correspondent peers he carried a sidearm. While covering the battle for El Caney, Creelman begged the U.S. general in command to allow him to join the charge on a blockhouse occupied by Spanish troops. Finally the general assented, and Creelman advanced on the fort along with U.S. troops. Seeing the Spanish flag lying on the ground, Creelman seized it, feeling that it was only fair that the Journal, which helped to start the war, should be the first to capture the Spanish flag at this important battle. Creelman waved the flag in front of some Spanish soldiers still entrenched nearby, who responded with a hail of gunfire, wounding Creelman in the arm and back.

In the mold of most yellow journalists of his time, Creelman was as much an advocate as a reporter — in her book The Yellow Kids, author Joyce Milton describes Creelman as the self-described "conscience of the fourth estate," who "normally did as much talking as listening" during interviews, including once lecturing Pope Leo XIII on relations between Protestants and Catholics . Creelman, generally considered one of the premier reporters of his day, also had a bit of an ego — Hearst once said of Creelman:

The beauty about Creelman is the fact that whatever you give him to do instantly becomes in his mind the most important assignment ever given any writer. ... He thinks that the very fact of the job being given him means that it's a task of surpassing importance, else it would not have been given to so great a man as he.

On his way to the front to cover World War I, Creelman died suddenly in Berlin, of Bright's Disease. He was buried in Brooklyn, New York.

=== Interview with Porfirio Díaz ===
Creelman got the scoop of a lifetime when he interviewed Mexican President Porfirio Díaz for Pearson's Magazine in 1908. One scholar has described Creelman as "An obscure American journalist, who by some mysterious means, was chosen by Díaz to publish a long, eulogistic article in the United States." Scholars have debated why Díaz chose to grant the interview to an American journalist. "It is not clear why Díaz made verbal commitments he did not seriously mean, but their consequences were very definite." This interview prompted Mexican President Porfirio Díaz to release a statement declaring he would call democratic elections and step down from office. This sparked several political movements which sought to remove Díaz's long period of rule and, subsequently, revolutionary uprisings.

For Zapata, Creelman's article was only a part of the general context of discontent with Díaz's policies, especially land ownership and rural disparities. Zapata's rebellion in the Morelos region was a reaction to the broken promises of land reform by Diaz. The pretense of political change created by the Creelman interview worked to radicalize figures like Zapata, who would later become a leading revolutionary championing agrarian rights and the return of land to peasants.

One theory is that Díaz gave it assuming it was aimed at a foreign readership; another is that it was for Mexican readers as a distraction from bad news of poor harvests and the financial effects of the panic of 1907. The interview could have also been aimed at drawing out Díaz's opponents so that they could be targeted by the regime. Yet another theory was to draw out Díaz's supporters to persuade him to run again, although in 1910 he would be 80. The Creelman interview remains a key factor in the events that led to the Mexican Revolution.

=== Personal life ===
Creelman married Alice Leffingwell Buell of Marietta, Ohio on December 10, 1891. The couple had four children: Edward Dunwoodie, James Ashmore, Constance Alice, and Eileen Buell. Son James went on to become a professional Hollywood screenwriter. Daughter Eileen married Frederick Morgan Davenport Jr., son of New York Republican congressman Frederick Morgan Davenport.

Creelman's father was born to an Ulster-Scottish family who migrated to Montreal from Limavady, Ireland. His mother was of Scottish descent.
