= 2020 Nova Scotia attacks =

Series of murders in Canada

- Location: 45.3971°N 63.7041°W (start of the rampage); 44.9275°N 63.5371°W (gunman's death); Nova Scotia, Canada
- Date: April 18, 2020 – April 19, 2020; 6 years ago 22:00 – 11:26 (ADT, UTC-03:00)
- Target: Neighbours, acquaintances, random civilians, RCMP officers
- Attack type: Spree shooting, mass shooting, mass murder, home invasion, shootout, arson
- Weapons: .223 Colt LE6940 semi-automatic rifle (smuggled); .223 Ruger Mini-14 semi-automatic rifle (illegally obtained); .40 S&W Glock 23 Gen 3 semi-automatic pistol (smuggled); 9mm Ruger P89 semi-automatic pistol (smuggled); 9mm Smith & Wesson 5946 semi-automatic pistol (stolen); Gasoline
- Deaths: 23 (including the perpetrator) (Note: An unborn child of one of the victims was also killed, but is usually not included in the death toll.)
- Injuries: 3
- Perpetrator: Gabriel Wortman
- Motive: Unknown

On April 18 and 19, 2020, 51-year-old Gabriel Wortman committed multiple shootings and set fires at 16 locations in the Canadian province of Nova Scotia, killing 22 people, and injuring three others before he was shot and killed by the Royal Canadian Mounted Police (RCMP) in the community of Enfield. The attacks are the deadliest shooting rampage in Canadian history.

Police were criticized for not using Alert Ready to warn the public about the unfolding attacks, as well as not responding to reports of Wortman's previous behaviour and acts of violence. An investigation into law enforcement's response to the rampage, including the decision not to use Alert Ready, was launched. A public inquiry into the law enforcement response was declared on July 28, 2020, following escalating criticism of the investigation's lack of transparency.

On May 1, 2020, in the wake of the attacks, Prime Minister Justin Trudeau, following through on a 2019 campaign promise, announced an immediate ban on some 1,500 makes and models of "military-grade assault-style" weapons, including two of the five guns used in the attacks. The ban included the Ruger Mini-14, as used in the École Polytechnique massacre. Wortman obtained the gun illegally within Canada, while the other four guns he used included a Smith & Wesson 5946 handgun stolen from an RCMP officer he had killed and three guns smuggled in from the United States. All firearms used in the attacks were acquired illegally.

== Events ==
=== April 18 ===
==== Portapique attacks ====
The attacks originated in the rural beachside community of Portapique, 130 kilometres (81 mi) north of Halifax, when Wortman assaulted his female partner Lisa Banfield at their cottage. During the assault, he poured gasoline throughout the cottage and set the residence on fire. Wortman then forced his partner to walk to their nearby warehouse and confined her in the back seat of his replica RCMP cruiser. She was able to escape and hid in the woods until early the next morning. Wortman set the warehouse on fire.

Beginning at 22:01, a number of Portapique residents called 9-1-1 to report gunshots and several fires. Investigative reporting by CBC News's The Fifth Estate found that the first call came from a woman named Jamie Blair, one of the first victims and a neighbour of Wortman. Her husband Greg had confronted Wortman outside their home and was subsequently shot and killed, becoming the first victim of the rampage. Jamie hurriedly ushered her two younger sons into a bedroom and was holding the door shut when Wortman fired multiple rounds through the door, killing her instantly. Wortman then tried to set the house on fire, but was unsuccessful and eventually left. The two boys managed to escape and fled to the home of a neighbour, Lisa McCully, who lived directly across the street from Wortman. A third son of the Blairs, who was not present at the time, said he believed Wortman targeted his father first because Greg Blair owned rifles and would have been able to stop the gunman.

At about 22:05, Wortman reportedly returned to his burning house and killed McCully, who had mistaken him for an RCMP officer responding to the fire. McCully's children took in the two Blair sons, and together they hid for several hours while on the phone with 9-1-1 waiting to be rescued. From then on, Wortman continued his rampage throughout Portapique, entering several of his neighbours' homes and shooting indiscriminately at anyone he came across. He deliberately set fire to some of the victims' houses.

At 22:10, two of Wortman's neighbours drove to his house to investigate the fire while calling 9-1-1. Along the way, they passed by the house of Dawn and Frank Gulenchyn, whom Wortman had already shot and killed, and noticed what appeared to be a police car parked in front with its roof lights off. After confirming Wortman's house was on fire, the two drove back and encountered the same police car fleeing the scene of another house fire. As they pulled alongside the vehicle, Wortman fired at them with a handgun, hitting the driver in the shoulder before he drove away.

==== Initial police response ====
When the first three RCMP officers arrived on the scene at 22:26, they slowly entered the neighbourhood on foot, eventually finding some of the victims. Police said many had died while trying to escape flames or to help other victims. Some of the victims were not discovered until many hours later. One officer reported by radio that they could not locate the shooter and that "it's very bad, what's going on down here". The Fifth Estate reported that the first responding officers were "overwhelmed" and called for assistance in locating or engaging the shooter.

First responders also found the neighbours whom Wortman shot at, who identified him by name and said he had gone towards the beach. They noted that there was another unmapped exit from the neighbourhood. They told the officers that Wortman was wearing a uniform and was driving in a replica police vehicle, which was also previously reported by several 9-1-1 calls.

At 23:32, the RCMP posted a tweet saying it was dealing with a "firearms complaint"; it asked residents of the Portapique area to stay inside with their doors locked, as officers set up a search perimeter of 2 kilometres (1.2 mi). Overnight, there was still confusion as to whether Wortman had been apprehended and if he was the driver of the apparent police car. At the time, the RCMP was unable to use a helicopter to assist in the manhunt because their only Atlantic-based helicopter was unavailable due to routine maintenance.

The RCMP later determined that Wortman had left Portapique at around 22:45, 19 minutes after police first responded, by taking a dirt road along a blueberry field, which the officers had not blocked off. After escaping, he spent the night parked behind a welding shop in the Debert area, about 26 kilometres (16 mi) east of Portapique. There, he left behind police equipment and gun-related items in a ditch on the property of a resident he knew. At some point later, the RCMP's Emergency Response Team responded to the Portapique attacks. Before then, residents reported seeing little to no law enforcement presence in the area, despite making 9-1-1 calls to report fires and gunshots.

=== April 19 ===
==== Wentworth Valley attacks ====
By 01:00, the RCMP had circulated internal bulletins to police agencies across Nova Scotia, identifying Wortman as a suspect who was "armed and dangerous" and associated with "an old white police car". At 05:43, Wortman left Debert and drove north on Highway 4 to a house whose residents he knew, located on Hunter Road in Wentworth, approximately 37 kilometres (23 mi) north of Portapique. He arrived at around 06:30 and shortly thereafter killed the two occupants and their two dogs. Wortman remained at the house for about three hours; what he did during that time is unclear.

At around that time, police located Wortman's spouse in Portapique; she had fled to a neighbour's home to call 9-1-1 since Wortman had smashed her cellphone. She was barefoot and claimed to have been hiding outdoors for much of the night. She confirmed that he was impersonating a police officer and provided a photo of his replica police vehicle. A BOLO alert containing this updated information was issued to officers across the province at around 08:00, warning Wortman "could be anywhere" in Nova Scotia. The RCMP publicly announced that they were dealing with an active shooter situation in Portapique at 08:02. Wortman was publicly identified as the suspect at 08:54.

Wortman eventually set fire to the house in which he had stayed. As he left, he killed a neighbour who had been out for a walk who saw the fire and tried to help. Wortman began driving south on Highway 4 back toward Portapique at 09:23. At 09:35, he shot and killed another victim, a woman who was walking on the side of the road in Wentworth Valley. At around 09:45, armed and still dressed in a police uniform, he went to another house in Glenholme whose residents he knew. The couple recognized him and refused to let him in, and the man armed himself with a 12-gauge shotgun to deter Wortman's entry.

Wortman tried to trick them into thinking he was an officer and involved in the manhunt. He called out his own name and shouted, "Come out with your hands up," but the couple called the police and he left. By 09:48, Wortman was seen near a campground in Glenholme.

==== Debert and Shubenacadie attacks ====
Before 10:00, in Debert, Wortman performed two traffic stops on random cars a few hundred metres apart and killed their occupants. At 10:08, he was seen travelling through Debert and Onslow. In a tweet posted at 10:17, the RCMP for the first time warned the public that Wortman was impersonating a police officer and shared the photo of his vehicle. At the Onslow-Belmont fire hall (set up as a shelter for victims from Portapique), two RCMP officers mistook an emergency management officer for Wortman and opened fire without warning. They missed their target and continued their manhunt without checking on the occupants of the fire hall. Wortman was recorded on surveillance video passing through Truro at around 10:20, and then Millbrook First Nation at 10:25. He briefly stopped in a parking lot to exchange his jacket for a reflective vest.

Sometime before 10:49, Wortman pulled alongside RCMP constable Chad Morrison's cruiser at the intersection of Route 2 and Route 224 in Shubenacadie, about 50 kilometres (30 mi) from Debert. Morrison had planned to meet fellow officer Heidi Stevenson at that location. Wortman shot into the car with a handgun, injuring Morrison, who fled down Route 2 and took shelter at an empty paramedic station. He was later found by paramedics and was transported to a hospital.

Wortman drove less than 500 metres (1,600 ft) south into the junction with Route 224 and collided head-on with Officer Stevenson, who was driving north. Stevenson engaged Wortman; he returned fire and killed her. Immediately after, he stole her sidearm and remaining ammunition before setting both cars on fire.

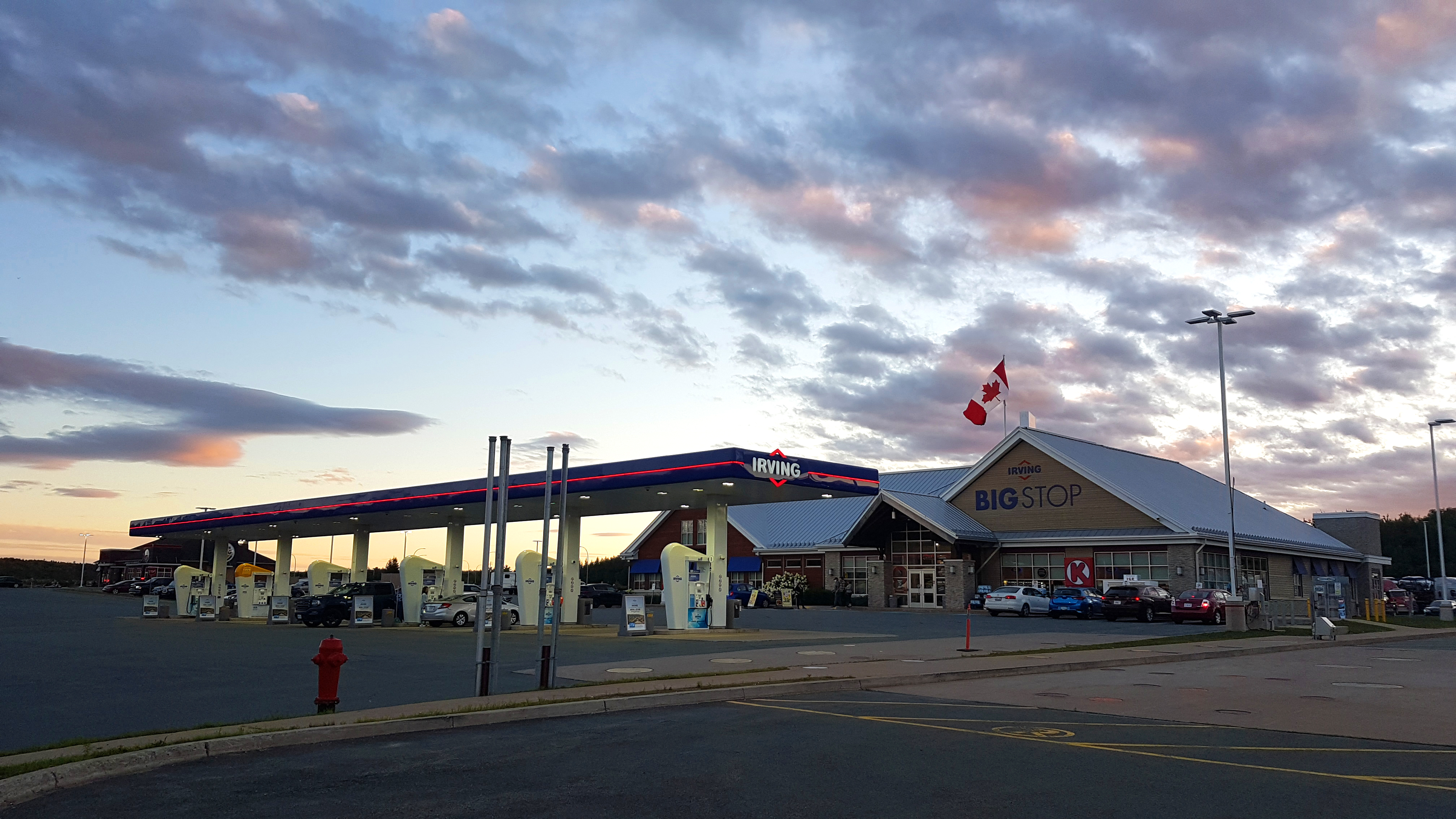
Irving Big Stop truck stop in Enfield where the perpetrator Gabriel Wortman was killed

Wortman shot and killed a nearby motorist who had stopped to help Stevenson, and drove off in the victim's silver Ford Escape SUV. Police announced the vehicle change at 11:06. Shortly thereafter, Wortman killed a woman he knew at her Shubenacadie home. He changed clothes again and stole her Mazda3 to drive away. By 11:24, he was spotted continuing south along Highway 102 through Milford.

==== Enfield shootout and Wortman's death ====
Over thirteen hours after police began pursuing him, at 11:26 a.m., Wortman stopped to refuel at the Irving Big Stop service area in Enfield, 92 kilometres (57 mi) south of Portapique and 40 kilometres (25 mi) north of Halifax. Two RCMP officers arrived, one drawing his firearm as he exited the vehicle, immediately aiming at Wortman inside the car. Wortman raised Stevenson's sidearm to his head and fired; the officers fatally shot him.

One officer discharged his rifle 11 times, the other one discharged his pistol 12 times. Wortman was struck twice in the head, twice in the neck, seven times in the right arm, once in the left arm, and had 25 wounds to his torso.

Wortman's death was confirmed by police at 11:40 a.m. According to a partially redacted document, Wortman's spouse said he had been on his way to Halifax to "get" someone before he was killed. Local authorities went to a residence to provide protection for its two occupants.

== Victims ==
List of victims (by location)

Portapique
- Greg Blair
- Jamie Blair
- Joy Bond
- Peter Bond
- Corrie Ellison
- Dawn Gulenchyn
- Frank Gulenchyn
- Lisa McCully
- Jolene Oliver
- Joanne Thomas
- Aaron Tuck
- Emily Tuck
- John Zahl

Wentworth

- Tom Bagley
- Lillian Campbell
- Sean McLeod
- Alanna Jenkins

Debert

- Kristen Beaton (plus her unborn child)
- Heather O'Brien

Shubenacadie

- Gina Goulet
- Cst. Heidi Stevenson
- Joey Webber

Wortman killed 22 people, including RCMP Constable Heidi Stevenson. The other officer he shot, Constable Chad Morrison, survived, as did the man he shot in Portapique who first reported his possible use of a police car. Wortman tied up and injured his partner before she escaped at the start of the rampage. Thirteen of the dead were found in Portapique, four in Wentworth, two in Debert, and three in Shubenacadie. They are believed to have died from gunshot wounds. Eight of the victims were found in the remains of structure fires.

According to RCMP commissioner Brenda Lucki, some of Wortman's first victims were closely connected to him, but over time, those he attacked were selected more at random. The Globe and Mail reported that one of the victims in Wentworth had previously gone hunting with Wortman, while CBC News reported that another victim owned the property in Portapique that was subject to a dispute between Wortman and his uncle.

Clinton Ellison, one of the survivors of the shooting and the brother of victim Corrie Ellison, later died by suicide in May 2026, after struggling with PTSD due to the shooting.

== Perpetrator ==
The RCMP identified the perpetrator as 51-year-old Gabriel Wortman (July 5, 1968 – April 19, 2020), a denturist who grew up in both Moncton and Riverview in New Brunswick. His estate, which consisted of six properties and three corporations, was valued at CA$2.1 million. Wortman had normally been living above his Dartmouth clinic, but he owned a cottage in Portapique beginning in 2004. He had a close friendship and business association with a former Fredericton lawyer who died in November 2009 and left him all of his possessions, including one of the rifles used in the attacks. Wortman did not have a possession and acquisition licence, which would have been needed to legally possess the rifle.

Gabriel Wortman was born to Paul and Evelyn Wortman. Gabriel's uncle, Alan Wortman, told the RCMP that Paul had experienced violence as a child, as the killer's paternal grandfather (Stanley Wortman) was violent toward his three eldest sons and their mother. Alan Wortman told the RCMP that at one point Paul Wortman beat their father up.

After the attacks, the decorative signs on Wortman's denture clinic on Portland Street in Dartmouth, portraying a large smile and a set of dentures, were the subject of complaints from the public. In response, Halifax Regional Police removed the signs on April 22. The building was demolished in January 2022.

=== Past charges and litigation ===
Wortman had previously pleaded guilty to assault in 2002 and was sentenced to nine months of probation, during which he was prohibited from possessing weapons and ordered to undergo anger management counseling.

Wortman was also involved in two civil lawsuits regarding property disputes, according to interviews and public records. In 2004, he offered to help a friend who had financial difficulties and was about to lose his house. Wortman then discreetly took ownership of the house, evicted the man, and sold the property. In 2015, Wortman's uncle lent him a house that he purchased in Portapique while selling his Edmonton condominium. Wortman refused to release the property back to him, claiming he was owed money, until the uncle eventually sold it; one of the buyers later became a victim in the killings.

=== Personality and police memorabilia hobbies ===
Witnesses described Wortman as paranoid, manipulative, and controlling. A psychiatrist Wortman visited four times in 2000 listed that he had a "narcissistic personality." According to Wortman's uncle, Wortman and his mother were abused by his father, a chronic petty thief who liked to manipulate the system to avoid paying money and that Wortman may have learned those habits from him. A cousin described Wortman as "almost a career criminal" who did "a lot of stuff but never got caught." A neighbour said Wortman was obsessed with his spouse and tended to be "jealous about things with her". Residents were suspicious that Wortman was stockpiling gasoline and propane tanks, and they reported hearing him brag about having lime and muriatic acid to dispose of bodies.

Neighbours also said that Wortman struggled with alcohol use and his business was negatively affected by the COVID-19 pandemic, which forced all non-essential denturist services in Nova Scotia to close. According to his spouse, Wortman, who took her across Nova Scotia in the hours before the attacks, had been "consumed" by the pandemic for weeks and believed he was going to die. He was also fearful that Prime Minister Justin Trudeau would begin controlling money, which prompted him to make hefty bank withdrawals. Additionally, Wortman communicated with an acquaintance via email about how other people were not prepared for it and how he was "well-armed" in advance.

According to his yearbook, Wortman aspired to become a police officer. However, his partner informed police after the attacks that Wortman disliked law enforcement and "thought he was better than them". He had a hobby of buying law enforcement memorabilia and refurbishing old police cruisers. At the time of the attacks, he was in possession of four such cruisers. Police found two of them on fire at his Portapique property and a third at his Halifax property, while Wortman initially drove the fourth during the attacks. One person called Wortman's home a "shrine" for the RCMP. He stored two of the vehicles behind his denture clinic.

According to a businessman in Dieppe, Wortman inquired about buying a decommissioned RCMP cruiser from him in 2017 or 2018, claiming to be a retired officer who wanted to park the vehicle outside his house to deter thieves. For price reasons, he did not buy it. A witness claimed Wortman tended to dress up in a police uniform and role-play.

=== Earlier warnings to police ===
On at least four occasions police were alerted to the gunman's behaviour. In 2001, he reportedly assaulted a 15-year-old boy.

In June 2010, Wortman was investigated by Halifax Regional Police for threatening his parents, but no official action was taken due to a lack of evidence. In May 2011, Truro Police received a tip from an unnamed source via email about Wortman's stash of guns and his desire to "kill a cop". The tipster warned about Wortman's recent stress and mental health issues and said he always kept a handgun close by. The tip was transferred to the Nova Scotia RCMP for jurisdictional reasons, but it is unclear what action was taken by them. The tip was ultimately purged from their records as is standard protocol according to an RCMP spokesperson.

A former neighbour in Portapique said he reported Wortman to the RCMP in the summer of 2013 for assaulting his spouse and having a cache of illegal firearms, but they declined to take firmer action due to not receiving a complaint from the partner. The former neighbour ended up leaving Portapique after Wortman became more aggressive and threatening to his spouse in response to the complaint. The RCMP confirmed they had received the neighbour's complaint but that the file had since been purged from their records.

== Investigations ==
=== Criminal ===
No motive has been established for the attacks. Over 25 different units of the RCMP were involved in the criminal investigation, along with the Halifax Regional Police and the Canada Border Services Agency. The Canadian Armed Forces were also dispatched on April 21 to assist the RCMP in their investigation by providing them with additional personnel and supplies. There were a total of 16 crime scenes, including five structure fires, spread over a distance of at least 50 kilometres (31 mi), along with 500 identified witnesses.

The man from whom Wortman had previously considered buying a police car said that he was warned by police during the incident that he was considered a possible target. However, Wortman ultimately never attacked him during the rampage.

The Nova Scotia RCMP Major Crime Unit launched a tip hotline to gather further information about the attacks.

On May 11, the RCMP's Behavioral Analysis Unit launched a "psychological autopsy" on Wortman, which involved extensive interrogations with his friends, family members, and colleagues. It found that he was an "injustice collector", a criminology term for those who keep track of perceived slights and petty grievances that occur over many years.

==== Acquisition of firearms and ammunition ====
Chief Superintendent Chris Leather said that Wortman had no Firearms Licence and his weapons were illegally acquired. Superintendent Darren Campbell said five firearms were recovered from the stolen vehicle Wortman was driving in Enfield. Four of them belonged to Wortman: two semiautomatic handguns and two semiautomatic rifles, one of which was described as a "military-style assault rifle". The fifth was Stevenson's stolen service pistol, a Smith & Wesson 5906. Police also said that while one of Wortman's firearms had originated within Canada, via the estate of a former associate who died in 2009, all of the others were smuggled in from the United States.

On June 25, 2022, the National Post reported on a briefing note sent to Prime Minister Justin Trudeau days after the shooting, which identified the four firearms owned by Wortman and used by him in the attacks. According to the note, the rifles were a Colt Law Enforcement Carbine and a Ruger Mini-14, both of which were among the firearm models and variants reclassified as prohibited by the Canadian government in the wake of the attacks. The pistols were a .40-caliber Glock 23 and a 9mm Ruger P89. Further information on the firearms and ammunition was released by court orders in December 2022.

The Ruger Mini-14 was the firearm Wortman acquired from his former associate's estate, having been imported into Canada from the United States and legally purchased in a Winnipeg gun store beforehand. A Canadian gun policy expert said that, while a Firearms Licence was required for someone to legally possess a Mini-14, the executor of an estate is allowed to temporarily own the estate's firearms. Conversely, the Colt was sourced to a gun store in California and the pistols to a gun store in Mattawamkeag, Maine. Wortman was said to have had acquaintances living in Maine; one confirmed to police that Wortman stole the Glock 23 from him and later said it was for his own protection, while another confirmed he loaned the Ruger P89 to Wortman "sometime within the last two to five years". An acquaintance also told police that the Colt was obtained at a gun show in the U.S. by an individual who gave it to a friend of Wortman's, who then gave it to Wortman himself. The Colt and both pistols were classified as restricted in Canada, meaning Wortman would have needed a Restricted Firearms Licence and to register them in order to legally own them; however, these firearms were all illegally smuggled into the country. In addition, the briefing note said Wortman was in possession of high-capacity magazines, which are illegal in Canada and were smuggled in from the US. The pistols were also equipped with laser sights.

==== Acquisition of police equipment ====
Leather noted that Wortman's use of a police car and a police uniform allowed him to evade detection for a long time. Owning police vehicles or uniforms is not a crime in Canada, but impersonating a police officer is. CBC News reported that at least one RCMP officer had previously taken note of one of Wortman's replica vehicles and advised him not to drive it on the road. Officials later said Wortman had acquired the specific vehicle he used in the attacks, a 2017 Ford Taurus, at an auction in the fall of 2019. It was recoloured white and stripped of its police accessories at the time of its purchase, a routine process for any recently decommissioned RCMP vehicle. Police confirmed Wortman had estranged relatives who were retired RCMP officers, but he had not obtained any police uniforms from them. The RCMP looked into the navigation logs of Wortman's vehicles to determine if the route he took during the attacks was predetermined.

Wortman is believed to have worked on refurbishing the decommissioned police vehicle used in the attacks over the course of nine months. The RCMP determined the decals used for the vehicle came from a supplier, but that they were made without the business owner's permission. The Financial Transactions and Reports Analysis Centre of Canada, a Canadian money-laundering watchdog agency, found that Wortman purchased police-themed vehicle accessories via PayPal, and that PayPal flagged a number of these transactions as suspicious between March 22 and December 5, 2019. Wortman's spouse said that he purchased police gear in both Canada and the U.S. According to records from the Canada Border Services Agency, Wortman crossed the Canada–United States border through Woodstock, New Brunswick, 15 times within the previous two years with his most recent return to Canada being on March 6.

==== Allegations denied by RCMP ====
In the weeks before the attacks, Wortman liquidated his bank accounts and withdrew a large sum of money in cash. News magazine Maclean's reported that a CA$475,000 withdrawal from Brink's and other evidence pointed to Wortman having ties to organised crime and being a confidential informant for the RCMP. In response to the allegations, the RCMP denied having any prior association with Wortman, saying his recent behaviour and stockpiling activities were driven by paranoia about the COVID-19 pandemic possibly growing out of control and leading to a widespread institutional and infrastructural collapse. They also said they found a fireproof safe containing hundreds of thousands of dollars at his Portapique property. A total of CA$705,000 was seized from the remains of Wortman's cottage after the attacks. A financial audit has been conducted as part of the investigation.

On July 27, court documents were unsealed, detailing police interviews with witnesses who claimed Wortman was a drug smuggler who provided people in Portapique and the nearby unincorporated community of Economy with drugs from Maine. These witnesses alleged Wortman had stockpiles of guns and drugs, along with false walls and hidden compartments, in his properties. The RCMP confirmed three days later that Wortman had kept hidden compartments in buildings, but they were unable to corroborate the drug smuggling claims. Another witness claimed Wortman had two crates of grenades acquired in the U.S.; a lawyer representing the victims' families reported that one of his clients found, at a crime scene in Portapique, wooden ammunition cases that could have been used to store grenades. Additional witnesses told police that Wortman and an associate tended to travel to the U.S. and smuggle cigarettes, alcohol, and presumably other illegal items from there, using a sailboat the associate owned.

In this context, the Nova Scotia Judge has ordered those certain amendments to the search warrant documents relating to the RCMP investigation into the events of April 18–19 remain unedited. The decision was made in response to an appeal to the court by the media coalition, which includes the Halifax Examiner. For its part, the RCMP issued a 1,600-word statement rebutting most of the details, saying that evidence was obtained from only one of the hundreds of people interviewed in the case.

==== Related arrests and prosecutions ====
On December 3, Wortman's spouse, her older brother, and a brother-in-law were charged with providing Wortman ammunition that he used in the attacks. The spouse was believed to have transferred .223 Remington and .40 Smith & Wesson cartridges, all of them purchased in Nova Scotia, between March 17 and April 18, 2020. However, the RCMP acknowledged that the three cooperated in the investigation and had "no prior knowledge" of Wortman's actions. The charges were dismissed after they opted to have the charges dealt with under a restorative justice process.

=== Police response ===
Nova Scotia's Serious Incident Response Team (SIRT) announced it would conduct an investigation into the police shooting of Wortman. They also investigated another incident involving two RCMP officers who discharged their weapons inside a fire hall in Onslow, mistakenly believing they had seen Wortman. On December 17, SIRT finished their review of Wortman's death and concluded the officers' actions were justified. A Global News investigation of the Onslow incident found indications that the officers involved mistook a third RCMP officer and an Emergency Management Office employee stationed at the fire hall for Wortman, but the SIRT investigation remains ongoing.

In an interview with As It Happens on April 25, Commissioner Lucki promised a thorough review of the police response to the attacks, including the delay in informing the public about Wortman potentially impersonating a police officer.

=== Lack of emergency alert ===
Following the attacks, many questions were raised about why Nova Scotia failed to use Alert Ready, Canada's mandatory emergency population warning system, to warn the public about the attacks but instead chose to use social media platforms Twitter and Facebook to provide updates. RCMP officials said they had been dealing with an unfolding situation and details were being updated frequently. However, the areas affected had poor cellular Internet service and were mostly populated by seniors who might not have used social media. Relatives of the victims pointed out that the use of Alert Ready could have saved lives. Chief Superintendent Leather said an investigation would be conducted into the decision-making process on alerting the public.

On April 22, Leather said officers in Dartmouth were asked by the province about a warning at 10:15 a.m., but they did not agree on details like wording before Wortman died 71 minutes later. The United States Consulate in Halifax said it emailed US citizens in Nova Scotia warning them of the situation using the RCMP's information.

=== Public inquiry ===
On July 28, 2020, federal Public Safety Minister Bill Blair announced a public inquiry. The federal and provincial governments had previously considered a more narrow "joint review," but, following public outcry and protests held by victims' families, they agreed to hold a more expansive public inquiry. The public inquiry does not have the power to compel testimony, and the RCMP Operations Manual authorizes the police force to lie to a public inquiry to protect the identity of informants and police assets.

Formally titled the Joint Federal/Provincial Commission into the April 2020 Nova Scotia Mass Casualty (or the Mass Casualty Commission), it was officially established on October 21 via an Order in Council issued by the Government of Canada and Province of Nova Scotia. The federal and provincial governments jointly selected three commissioners to conduct the inquiry: J. Michael MacDonald (former chief justice of Nova Scotia), Leanne J. Fitch (retired police chief), and Dr. Kim Stanton. The independent public inquiry was created to examine the mass casualty in Nova Scotia and to provide meaningful recommendations to keep communities safe in the future. The list of the Commission Team, information on its Mandate, the Research Advisory Board, and the other Foundational Documents and Commissioned Reports were published on the Commission's site. The inquiry included mandates on probing the RCMP response and the role gender-based violence played, and was expected to deliver an interim report by May 1, 2022, followed by a final report six months later. In May 2022, the Interim Report of the Commission on Mass Victims was published by the Joint Federal-Provincial Commission of Inquiry into Nova Scotia Mass Casualty.

Additionally, there was a webcast which operates on an ongoing basis to broadcast the public proceeding, which informs the public about the work of the commission.

On March 30, 2023, the Mass Casualty Commission released its final report, which was highly critical of the RCMP. The report faulted the service for failing to warn the public of the shooting, its poor preparation for such situations, and for its systemic inflexibility and lack of accountability. More than half of the report's 130 recommendations were targeted at the RCMP, including one calling the federal Public Safety Minister to start an independent review of the force. Other recommendations included better funding for addressing intimate partner violence, creating a dedicated organization for victim support (one officer was provided for all 21 non-police victims' families), stronger restrictions on gun ownership, and the nationalization and overhaul of the privately operated Alert Ready system.

== Aftermath ==
=== Political reactions ===
Prime Minister Trudeau speaks about the killings on April 20

Canadian Prime Minister Justin Trudeau expressed his condolences and delivered remarks on the mass shooting tragedy in Nova Scotia. During his morning address from Rideau Cottage on April 20, he reaffirmed his commitment to strengthening gun control. Trudeau also stated, "A gunman claimed the lives of at least 18 people. Among them, a woman in uniform, whose job it is to protect lives, even if it endangers her own, constable Heidi Stevenson of the RCMP" and asked the media to not use the attacker's name or image: "Do not give this person the gift of infamy."

On April 19, 2020, the prime minister, Justin Trudeau, issued a statement on the shooting in Portapique, Nova Scotia, saying:

I was saddened to learn about the senseless violence in Nova Scotia, which claimed the lives of multiple people, including one member of the Royal Canadian Mounted Police (RCMP), Cst. Heidi Stevenson, a 23-year veteran of the Force. Earlier today, I spoke with the RCMP Commissioner and the Premier of Nova Scotia to offer my condolences, on behalf of the Government of Canada. The people of Nova Scotia are strong and resilient, and we will be here to support them as they heal from this tragedy.

Nova Scotia Premier Stephen McNeil told reporters, "This is one of the most senseless acts of violence in our province's history." He expressed his condolences to the residents affected and the families of the victims.

Elizabeth II, Queen of Canada, expressed her condolences, saying that she and Prince Philip were "saddened by the appalling events", and that her thoughts and prayers were with the people of Nova Scotia and all Canadians. She also paid tribute to the "bravery and sacrifice" of the RCMP and other emergency services.

The White House condemned the attacks and expressed US President Donald Trump and First Lady Melania Trump's condolences. Statement from the Press Secretary released the following: "As friends and neighbours, we will always stand with one another through our most trying times and greatest challenges. The United States strongly condemns these murders, and our prayers are with the victims and their families". Condolences for the victims were issued by other countries as well.

Since the attacks, the lack of transparency in the investigation has been strongly criticised, and calls have been made for a public inquiry into the police response, including by dozens of senators from Nova Scotia and across the country. On June 3, Nova Scotia Justice Minister Mark Furey announced a public inquiry of some kind will be held in the near future, but a month later, he said the proceedings into the inquiry's formation were being hampered by legal technicalities. On July 28, federal Public Safety Minister Bill Blair announced that a public inquiry would take place.

=== Gun laws ===
On May 1, Trudeau announced that the sale, transportation, importation, or use of "assault-style" firearms in Canada was now banned effective immediately. Via Order in Council, the government re-classified them from Restricted to Prohibited under the Firearms Act, with a two-year amnesty period to allow current owners to dispose, export, or sell them (under a buy-back scheme), and for special uses. The prohibition applies to at least 1,500 models and variants, largely semi-automatic firearms (fully automatic and certain specifically chosen firearms were already classified as "Prohibited"), including the AR-15 and guns that had been used in other notable mass shootings in Canada, such as the Ruger Mini-14 (École Polytechnique massacre), and the Beretta Cx4 Storm (2006 Dawson College shooting).

The intended long-term effects of the ban were questioned by experts, who pointed out it would have had no effect on Wortman's illegal acquisition of his firearms. They also highlighted the ban's inability to address international firearms trafficking or other types of smuggled firearms used in criminal activity. Five separate court challenges were raised in response to the ban, claiming the Canadian government contravened the Firearms Act and unfairly targeted legal gun owners.

On May 3, Public Safety Minister Bill Blair announced plans to expand Canada's red flag law to include family members and others.

The Liberal Party of Canada announced on its website measures against gun violence and a ban on the use, sale or import of assault weapons, most used in mass shootings in the immediate aftermath of the tragedy.

=== Criticism of the RCMP response ===
The families of the victims, as well as the residents of Portapique, strongly condemned the RCMP's response to the attacks, as well as their transparency in the criminal investigation. CBC News' television program The Fifth Estate and online newspaper Halifax Examiner analyzed the timeline of events, and both observed a myriad of failures and shortcomings in the RCMP response. A criminologist criticised the RCMP's response as "a mess" and called for an overhaul in how the agency responds to active shooter situations, citing its failure to properly respond to other such incidents in the past.

Starting April 22, 2020, the RCMP began providing updates on the investigation into the incidents on April 18–19 and launched a condolence platform on its official website.

=== Memorials and fundraisers ===
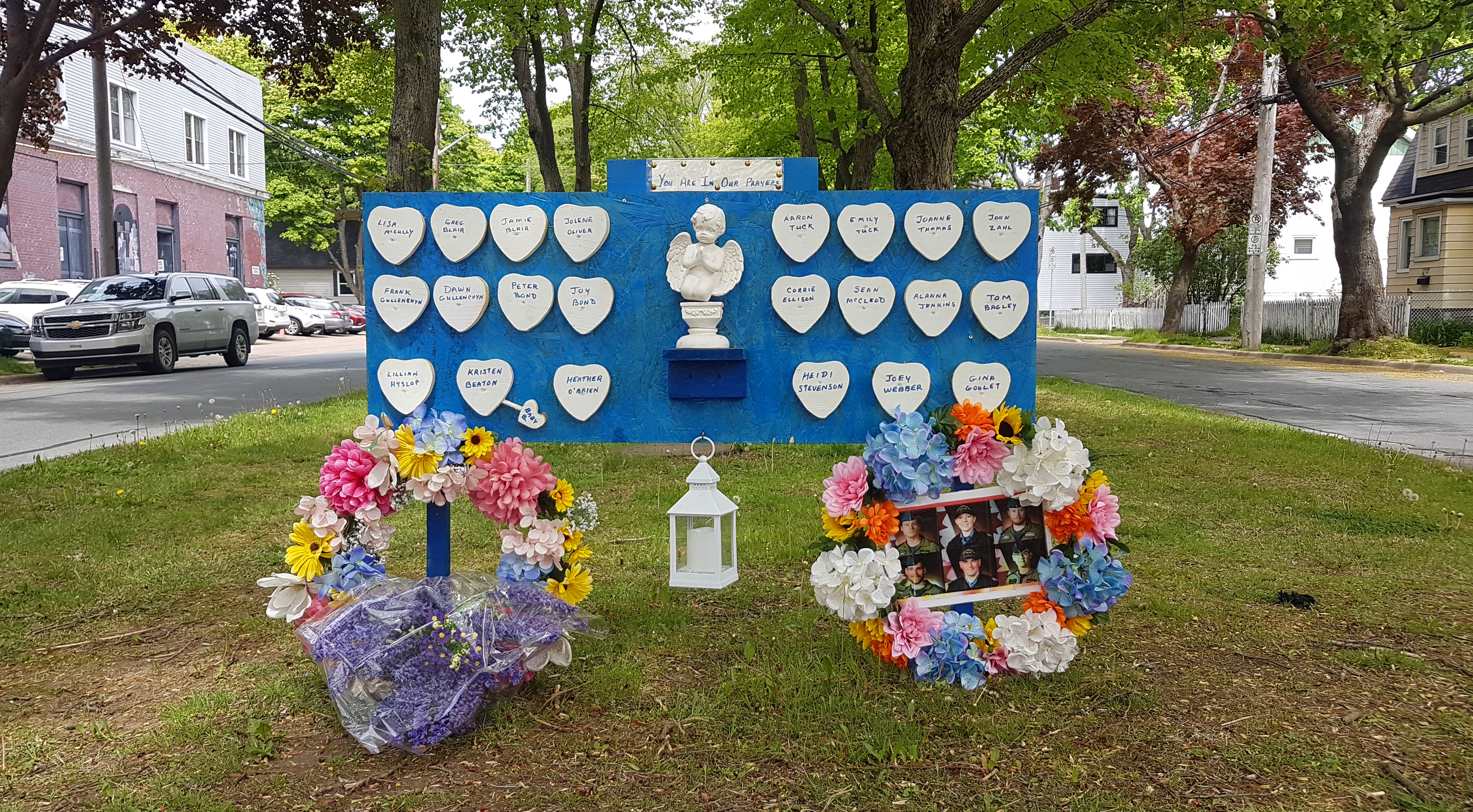
A memorial for the victims of the attacks in the Hydrostone neighbourhood of Halifax, Nova Scotia. A photo of the six victims of the April 30, 2020, Royal Canadian Air Force (RCAF) CH-148 Cyclone helicopter crash off Greece had been added to the lower right part of the memorial

Flags across Canada were lowered to half-mast, and the House of Commons observed a moment of silence for the victims.

On April 20, the CN Tower was illuminated in blue and white, the colours of the Nova Scotia flag, and also in RCMP red, blue, and gold in honour of Stevenson, on the quarter- and half-hours. On April 21, at Niagara Falls, both the Canadian Horseshoe Falls and the American Falls were also illuminated in blue and white as a symbol of bi-national solidarity with Nova Scotia.

In the days after the incident, many fundraisers for the victims and their families were started on the crowdfunding platform GoFundMe. There was also at least one fake or fraudulent fundraiser started, which was subsequently removed. Jeff Thomson of the RCMP's Anti-Fraud Centre warned Canadians to be diligent when donating to charities related to the tragedy.

As large gatherings were restricted in the province due to the COVID-19 pandemic, a public virtual vigil was streamed online via Facebook, and broadcast by CBC Television in the Atlantic provinces.

A permanent memorial to the victims was set up at a former church in Portapique, after an earlier makeshift memorial was dismantled by residents.

On April 18, 2022, Marco Mendicino, minister of public safety, issued a statement on the second anniversary of the attack.

=== Misogyny and domestic violence ===
Following RCMP confirmation that the attacks were preceded by an act of domestic violence, women's rights advocates said the rampage highlighted a broader problem of domestic violence in Canada, as well as its potential as a warning sign for future violent behaviour and public threats. Activists criticised law enforcement's inability to respond to earlier domestic violence reports against Wortman and called for attention to be placed on the role of misogyny in the attacks. These activists also expressed concern about the criminalization of Wortman's victimized spouse, who suffered extreme domestic violence.

Citing eyewitness reports of Wortman's behaviour and ways of controlling his partner, domestic violence experts called for the passage of a coercive control law in Canada, similar to one that had been passed by the United Kingdom in 2015, which they say may "help prevent other abusers from escaping detection".

Following the shooting, the Nova Scotia Health Authority, IWK Health Centre, Dalhousie University, and many other universities formed Heal Nova Scotia (Heal-NS), a multi-disciplinary group of researchers tasked with investigating the role of domestic violence in this specific event, as well as topics related to violence in general, in hopes of helping those traumatized by the shooting find closure. The group stated on its website that "many unanswered questions remain ... Finding answers to these questions may aid in coping, understanding and healing for those affected by this tragedy in Nova Scotia and beyond."

=== Lawsuits ===
Relatives of the victims filed a lawsuit against Wortman's estate for damages caused by the rampage. Another lawsuit was filed by victims' families against the RCMP and Nova Scotia, citing the former's "disrespectful manner" to victims and their families and its handling of the attacks, both during and after the event. In June, Wortman's partner renounced her status as his executor and eventually filed her own lawsuit against his estate on August 13. In February 2021, the lawsuit filed by the victims' families added the names of Wortman's partner, her brother, and her brother-in-law.

The alleged representatives of the plaintiffs in the case are Tyler Edison Blair and Andrew Frederick O'Brien, who filed the lawsuit in Nova Scotia Supreme Court.

== See also ==
- List of massacres in Canada
- List of rampage killers in the Americas
- 2022 Saskatchewan stabbings, a similar spree killing in Canada
- 2011 Norway attacks, another mass shooting where the perpetrator impersonated a policeman
- Cumbria shootings, a similar spree killing in England
- 2025 shootings of Minnesota legislators, politically-motivated shootings involving police impersonation
- 22 Murders, 2022 book about the attack by Paul Palango
