= Alice Creelman =

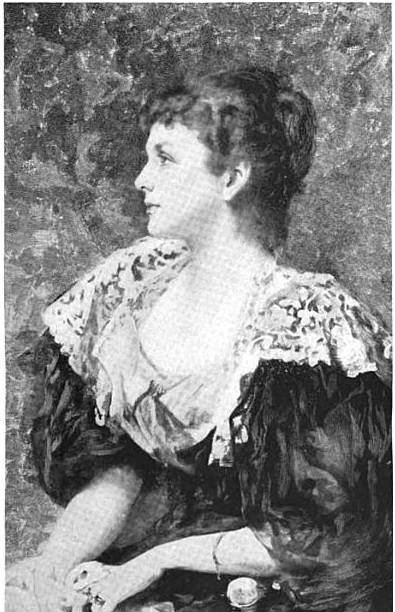
- Painting by J.J. Shannon of Alice Leffingwell Buell Creelman, exhibited at the New York Academy exhibition in 1895.
- Born: December 19, 1858; Marietta, Ohio
- Died: September 18, 1952 (aged 93)
- Other name: Alice Leffingwell Buell Creelman
- Occupation: Art Dealer
- Spouse: James Creelman (m. 1891)
- Children: 4

Alice Creelman (1858–1952) was an artist and art dealer in New York City during the Gilded Age. Originally from Marietta, Ohio, she traveled often as an adult, though New York was her main place of residence. She was married to the well-known yellow journalist James Creelman.

== Personal life ==
Creelman was born in Marietta, Ohio, to Edward Wyllyss Buell and Melissa Barker. Both her father and her mother were descendants of pilgrims who traveled to America on the Mayflower. Though several accounts list her birth date as December 19, 1858, in a passport application from 1915 she writes that she was born on December 9, 1859. As well as dealing art, Creelman painted. In fact, according to a magazine published in 1896, she "won a reputation in New York and Paris with her clever paintings". The magazine further describes an earlier incident:

"Miss Buell had not only beauty but pluck. She was sketching in Belgium once, when the owner of the property upon which she had set up her easel objected, and ordered her off. Miss Buell appealed to the king, with the result that she was allowed to finish her picture in peace."

The location and preservation status of Creelman's paintings are currently not known.

=== Marriage ===
Alice married James Creelman on December 10, 1891, in Paris. Written correspondence between the two shows they had been in contact since at least 1890. By 1894 she had begun writing a biographical sketch of James, who was already making a name as a reporter.

The couple lived among and were friends with many of the New York City elite. Harry Scovel, an attempted recruit of newspaper publisher William Randolph Hearst who was invited to the Creelman's apartment for dinner, characterized the couple and their home as "charming".

Creelman's husband, James, died in 1915 while reporting on World War I. When James fell ill in Berlin, Alice applied for a visa to go visit and tend to her husband, but did not make it to Germany before his death. Indeed, she could not even reach his body because of the blockade.

At this time Creelman was faced with financial issues. In a letter to Henry Clay Frick she lamented that "with the passing away of my husband, my life and fortune have been completely wrecked". Though James left his whole estate to his wife, and named her as "the sole executrix" of his will, the New York Times from 13, March 1915 also states that "Mr. Creelman left no real estate". In August 1915, Creelman bought an apartment from Malcom E. Smith & Co, moving from the Upper West Side apartment she had shared with James to a "large, duplex" apartment at 131 East Sixty-sixth Street.

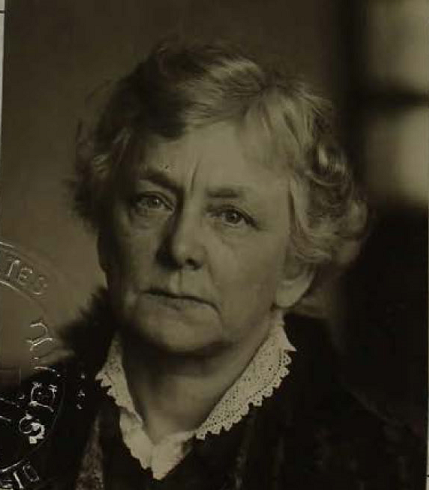
Photo on Mrs. Creelman's passport application

After her move, Creelman, then 57, brought a suit against the Pennsylvania Railroad Company after a fall going down the stairs of Penn Station. Creelman suffered several broken bones as well as a severe concussion of the brain and spinal cord. She asked for $25,000 from the Rail Company because she asserted the cause of her fall was improper stairway treads that had the wrong type of "corrugations and grooves".

=== Children ===
Alice and James had four children, James Ashmore (sometimes referred to as James Ashman), Constance Alice, Eileen Buell Creelman, and Edward Dunwoodie Creelman. Edward died shortly after birth and is buried in Marietta, Ohio. Her daughter Constance married Col. Harold Woods Huntley in 1918. Creelman's son James died in 1941. He was buried in a private ceremony at Walton Hall on the Upper East Side of Manhattan.

== Career ==
In a passport application from 1915, Creelman left the career section unfilled. However, she undoubtedly worked as an art dealer. She sold several Old Master paintings to Henry Clay Frick, listed below:

- Whistler, James McNeill, 1834–1903, Symphony in Flesh Colour and Pink: Portrait of Mrs. Frances Leyland—purchased through Creelman in 1917
- Van Dyck, Anthony, Sir, 1599–1641, Sir John Suckling—purchased through Creelman in 1918
- Titian (Tiziano Vecellio), 1477/1490 - 1576, Portrait of a Man in a Red Cap, 1516—purchased through Creelman in 1915
- Hans Holbein, the Younger, 1497/1498 - 1543, Thomas Cromwell, 1532-1533—purchased through Creelman in 1915

The Titian and the Holbein were acquired by Frick together in 1915, in a deal arranged by Creelman. Both paintings were owned by Sir Hugh Lane, who at this time was raising funds for the National Gallery of Ireland. This sale satisfied Frick's desire to add another Holbein to his collection. She wrote to him in April 1915:

I came in touch with a small collection of wonderful paintings belonging to a titled man who has been ruined by the war and must part with them or go bankrupt. They are superb and I should like to tell you about them and to show you some fine photographs of them. They are unquestioned in pedigree and authenticity. There is a beautiful Titian, really beautiful and not only historic, and a superb Holbein (I think the finest in the world)

Alice made $26,000 in commission from the sale, which aided her injured financial situation. Frick had previously been approached about these paintings by Charles Carstairs, but refused the offer. Though many art dealers of the time were flamboyant in the marketing of their product, Creelman may have been a more inconspicuous dealer. She wrote that Lane approached her with the pictures because he wanted the matter to be handled discreetly.

== Social affiliations and friendships ==
Creelman was a member of several organizations that based membership on genealogical ties to early Americans. In 1904 Creelman is listed as a member of Daughters of the American Revolution in their yearly bulletin. At this time she was still located in her hometown of Marietta at 221 4th street. Four years later in 1908 she appears again in the yearly bulletin, this time with her residency listed as 67 West 94th street, New York, NY. This would be her main home until after the death of her husband in 1915, when she moved to the Upper East Side of Manhattan.

Her claim to membership of DAR was her relation to Captain Daniel Hand, from whom she is descended on her father's side. Captain Daniel Hand commanded the sixth company of the Revolutionary Army in Connecticut.

Creelman was also a member of the National Society of Colonial Dames. In order to be a member of this society, she proved that she was sixth in descent from Major David Buel, and also descended from General Joseph Buell of Ohio.

In addition, Creelman was able to join the General Society of Mayflower Descendants because of her relation to William Bradford. She joined the society in 1906, when she was living in New York, and was listed as a "Life and Regular Member". Though a bulletin published by the Mayflower Society specifies that Edward Wyllyss Buell, Creelman's father, was the parent descended from William Bradford, more recent genealogy charts trace her descent through her mother's line. Though it is possible that both of Creelman's parents were distantly related to the same man who traveled from England to America in the 1620s, it is also likely that there was a mistake made either by the Mayflower Society or the historians behind the genealogical index.

Alice Creelman was associated with many of the time's notable people. She was well acquainted with Henry Clay Frick, and through her husband she was familiar with William Randolph Hearst and composer Antonín Dvořák. Another associate of theirs was Cora Crane, wife of Stephen Crane. In 1898, an incident occurred between the two women. Crane wrote to the Creelman family, asking for donations to her private fund for the children of Kate Lyon and Harold Frederic, who had died several months earlier. Alice responded in the negative, criticizing Kate Lyon for "the evil influence she has exerted over a morally weak man". Cora Crane responded to Creelman's letter, writing, "To me, the supreme egotism of women who never having been tempted, and so knowing nothing of the temptation of another's soul, set themselves upon their pedestals of self-conceit and conscious virtue, judging their unfortunate sisters guilty alike, is the hardest thing in life".

In November 1930 Creelman was a patroness for a fundraising dance for Simmons College Alumnae Scholarship fund.
