= Castlereagh, Nova Scotia =

Community in Nova Scotia, Canada

Coordinates: 45°31′0.09″N 63°44′55.88″W

Castlereagh in Nova Scotia

Castlereagh is an unincorporated community in the Canadian province of Nova Scotia, located in Colchester County. It was named for Robert Stewart, Viscount Castlereagh.

Once a bustling village, only a few houses remain in Castlereagh - the only people found there now tend to be those occupying seasonal camps, typically for hunting or logging.
