= Portapique =

Community in Nova Scotia, Canada

Coordinates: 45°24′16.98″N 63°42′11.5″W

Portapique in Nova Scotia

Portapique (/ˈpɔːrtəpɪk/) is an unincorporated community in the Canadian province of Nova Scotia, located in Colchester County. It has about 100 residents in winter and increases to 250 residents in summer.

Situated near the mouth of the Portapique River, which flows into the Minas Basin, its economy is based mainly on farming and some forestry.

It was the site of an Acadian settlement called Porcepic or Vil Port-au-pique named after porcupines in the area. After the Expulsion of the Acadians in 1755, the community was resettled in the late 1760s and early 1770s by Ulster Scots families from the Londonderry Township settlement in nearby Great Village, joined by a later wave of Northern Irish settlers in the 1820s. In the 1840s, the small mixed farms of Portapique developed an important shad fishery, exporting thousand of barrels of pickled shad to the Boston fish markets. A unique regional boat suited to the tidal rivers of the area was developed around Portapique by boat builders such as William G. Hall. The commercial shad fishery collapsed in the 1920s, although a seasonal recreational fishery has remained popular.

In April 2020, Portapique was one of the locations of the 2020 Nova Scotia attacks, the deadliest spree killing in Canadian history. 13 of the shooting's victims were in Portapique.
