= Upper Economy =

Community in Nova Scotia, Canada

Coordinates: 45°23′20.6″N 63°50′11.7″W

Upper Economy is an unincorporated community in the Canadian province of Nova Scotia, located along Trunk 2 in western Colchester County.

The community is located along the shoreline of the western end of Cobequid Bay north into the lower slopes of the Cobequid Mountains. It includes the locality of Pleasant Hills, and borders Little Bass River to the west.

== History ==
Upper Economy was first settled in 1768 by the Hill brothers, Robert, [Charles, and Patrick, who were each allotted in March of that year 500 acres (2.0 km^{2}) of land.

Historically economic activity in Upper Economy was exclusively farming. Nowadays, there is little farming done. Some timber and pulp wood harvesting is done as well as weir and clam fishing.

As with much of Colchester County, the original inhabitants of Upper Economy were of Ulster Scottish origin. Historically common surnames in the area included Brown, Hill, and Fulton. Lewises who settled here were Scottish.

== Sites ==
Upper Economy is the location of a Dutch artisan, organic cheesemaker, and a German-style log home manufacturer, both on or next to Brown Road, a road running north-south in the middle of the community.
