= White ribbon =

Type of awareness ribbon

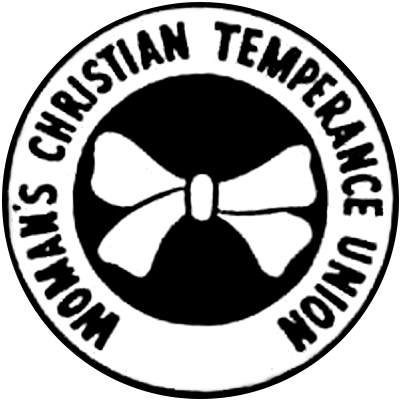
The logo of the Woman's Christian Temperance Union (WCTU) is a white ribbon bow, representing purity.

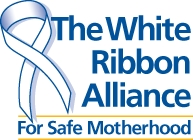
White Ribbon Alliance Logo

The white ribbon is an awareness ribbon sometimes used by political movements to signify or spread their beliefs. It is usually worn on garments or represented in information sources such as posters, leaflets, etc.

The White Ribbon has been the badge of the Woman's Christian Temperance Union founded by Frances Willard since its founding in 1873. The WCTU claims to be the oldest continuing non-sectarian women's organization worldwide. The white ribbon bow was selected to symbolize purity. The WCTU traditionally uses the bow rather than the more modern "remembrance" loop.

One of the most notable usages of the white ribbon in recent times is as the symbol of anti-violence against women, safe motherhood, and other related causes.

It also has a long tradition in state fairs and similar farming and horticultural competitions in the United States and Canada as a third-place ribbon.

== Anti-violence against women and gender justice movement ==
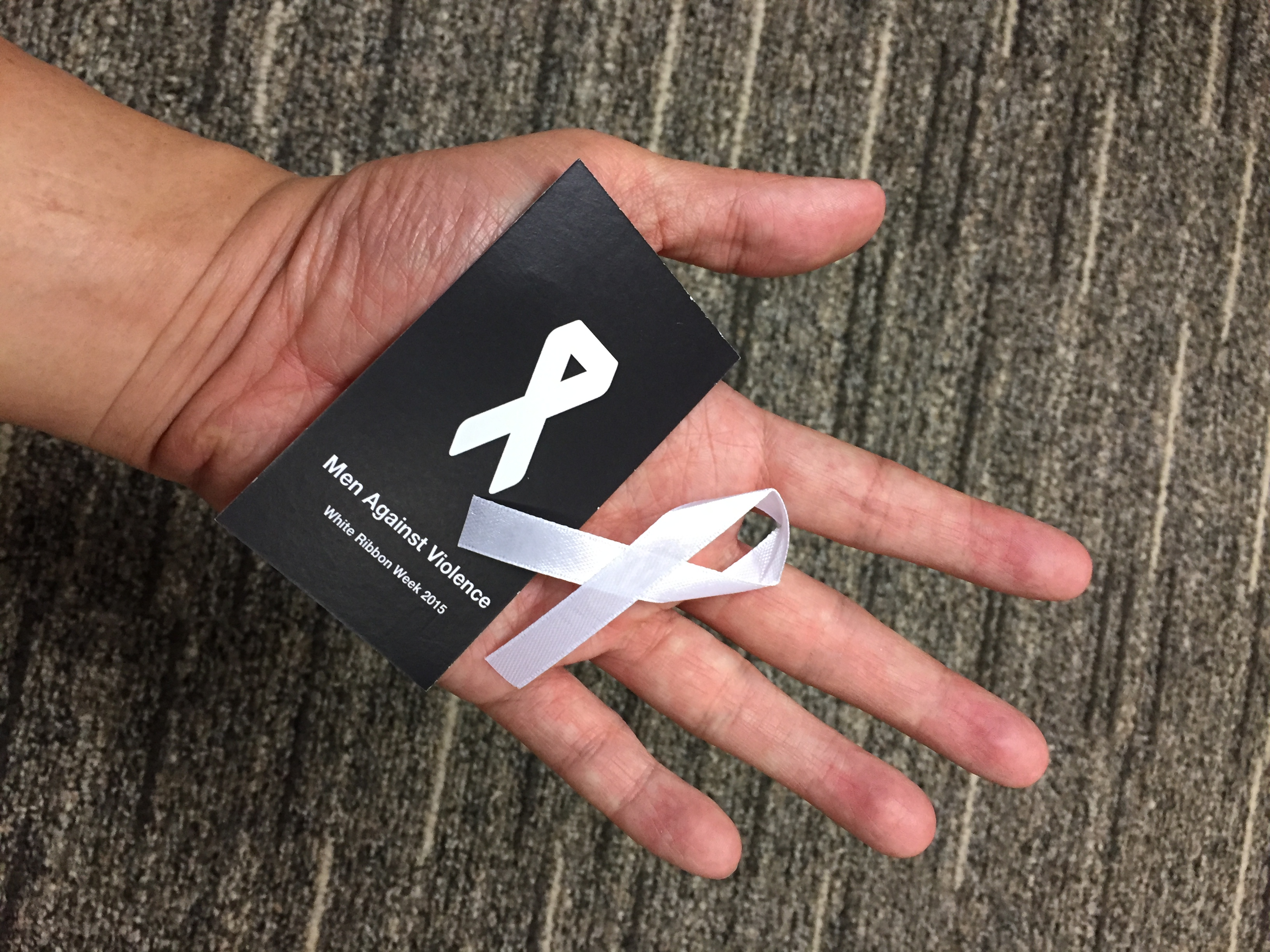
A white ribbon given out by the Association of Women for Action and Research in Singapore during White Ribbon Week 2015, a campaign opposing violence against women

After the École Polytechnique massacre on December 6, 1989, where 14 women were killed by an anti-feminist, a movement formed in Canada involving men wearing the white ribbon to signify opposition to violence against women.

The White Ribbon Campaign (WRC) appeared in 1991 in relation to this movement and became one of the largest men's anti-violence programs in the world. Started by activists such as Michael Kaufman and Toronto politicians like the late New Democratic Party leader Jack Layton, it has now spread to over 57 countries around the world. It is now an international effort of men and boys working to end violence against women. Its basic principle is the importance of men and boys speaking out against all forms of violence against women. For that purpose, members of the WRC offer a variety of presentations and workshops on violence. In Canada, the campaign is run from November 25 (the International Day for the Eradication of Violence Against Women) until December 6, Canada's National Day of Remembrance and Action on Violence Against Women. Other countries support 16 Days of Activism from November 25 until December 10, but campaigns can occur at any time of the year.

In 2014, A Voice for Men launched whiteribbon.org as a counter to the White Ribbon campaign. Accused of "hijacking" White Ribbon, the site was harshly criticized by Todd Minerson, executive director of The White Ribbon Campaign, who described it as "a copycat campaign articulating their archaic views and denials about the realities of gender-based violence". According to the site, its purpose is to present the view that domestic violence is "not a gendered problem". According to Cosmopolitan magazine, the site is used to display "anti-feminist propaganda".

== Quebec peace movement ==
In the beginning of 2003, a custom, largely influenced by the Échec à la guerre collective, emerged in Quebec of wearing the white ribbon to show a belief in the need for peace (mostly in opposition to the then-impending war in Iraq). The roots of the choice of the white ribbon are probably the traditional association of white with peace and the White Ribbon Campaign.

Premier Bernard Landry took to wearing the white ribbon and the other two main party leaders in Quebec, Jean Charest and Mario Dumont, followed suit.

== U.S. county and state fairs ==
At county and state fairs in the United States, a white ribbon often denotes a third-place finish in a contest.

== 2011–2013 Russian protests ==
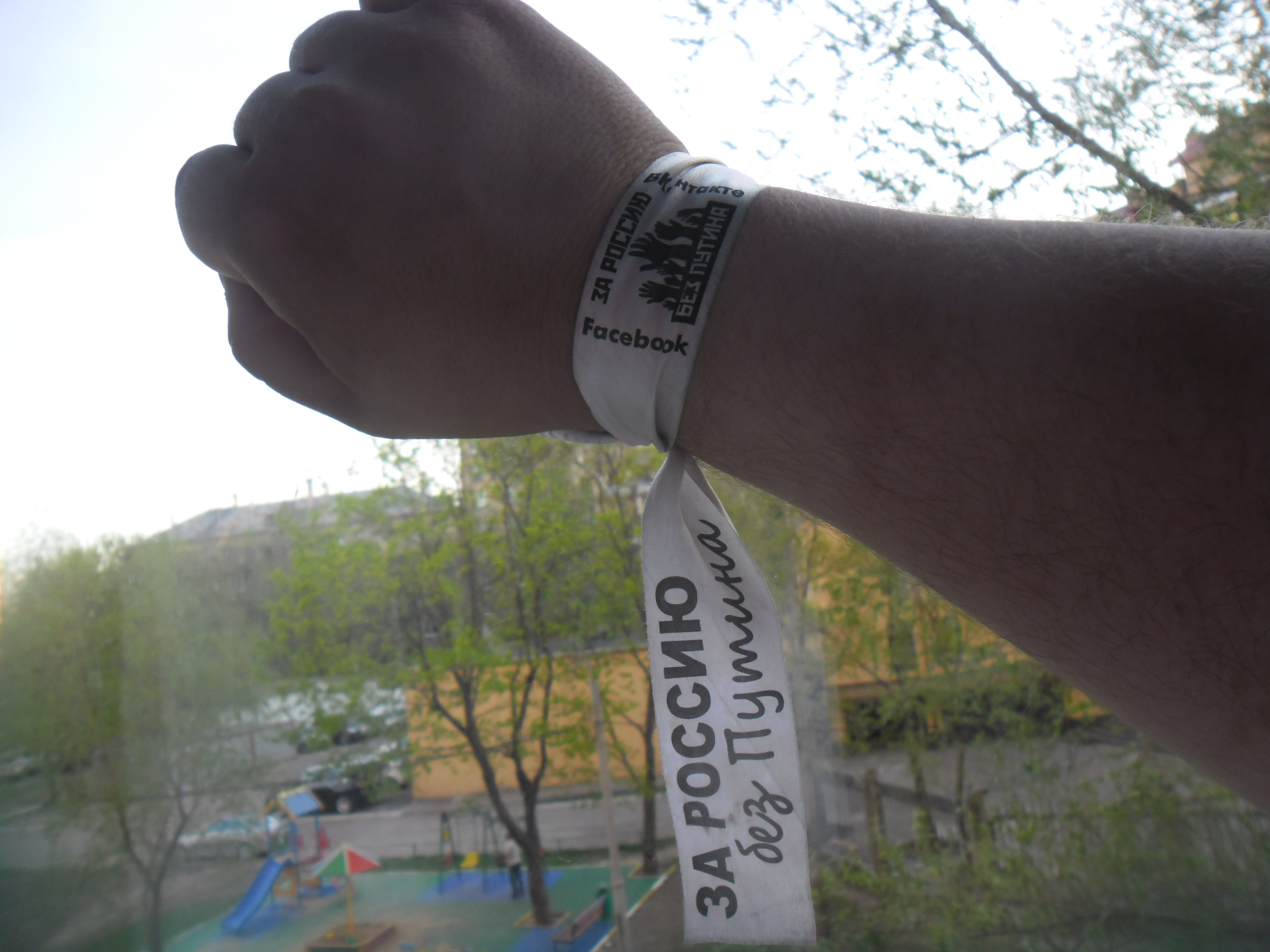
The White Ribbon "For Russia Without Putin"

During the 2011–2013 Russian protests, the white ribbon emerged as a symbol of opposition and since the elections has picked up momentum. Many Russians have been tying it to their clothing, cars, and other objects, and the motif has appeared on runet and on Twitter. By 10 December, the TV Rain channel was showing a white ribbon by its on-screen logo. The station's owner, Natalya Sindeyeva, explained this as being a sign of "sincerity", rather than "propaganda", and an attempt to be "mediators" instead of simply journalists. NTV described 10 December as the day of "white ribbons". Vladimir Putin compared the white ribbons to condoms being used as a symbol of the fight against AIDS.

== Other uses/combined with other colors ==
At the Streamy Awards of 2010, white ribbons were worn in support of net neutrality.

It also means friendship.

White ribbons are used to signify support for self-harmers (from people who are not self-harmers themselves), while white and orange ribbons represent self-harmers who are trying to quit or have succeeded in doing so already.

White ribbons are used for teen pregnancy prevention awareness.

White ribbons have also been used to protest child pornography. The white is supposed to signify the protection of innocence and purity.

White ribbons are used to promote awareness for severe combined immunodeficiency (SCID) and SCID Newborn screening. Since 2001, when many SCID families met face-to-face for the first time, the white ribbon was used as a way to identify themselves to one another. White was the chosen color because it would honor all the SCID angels lost to this horrific disease. White ribbons continue to honor all those SCID angels and remind the world that SCID Newborn Screening is their legacy.

In 2019, the government of Catalonia changed a yellow ribbon on a banner on its headquarters building in Barcelona to a white ribbon in response to a ban by the national government of Spain on yellow ribbons on public buildings due to it being viewed as a political symbol (it is used there to call for release of political prisoners).

== See also ==
- Ribbon
- Stop Violence Against Women, a campaign of Amnesty International
- Symbolism of white
- White flag
- White Knot a white ribbon for the marriage equality movement
