= Anorak (disambiguation) =

An anorak is a type of coat with a hood. Anorak may also refer to:

- Anorak (album), a 2008 album by Ruth
- Anorak (slang), British slang for a railfan, or for someone with obsessive and specific interests
- Anorak Magazine, a British children's magazine
- Anorak in the UK, a 2008 live album by Marillion
- The Anorak, a play about the École Polytechnique massacre
- James D. Halliday, a deceased character in Ready Player One whose OASIS persona is Anorak
- Anoraak, French electronic musician

== See also ==
- Exercise Anorak Express, a 1990 NATO exercise
- Anora (disambiguation)
