= JRHS =

JRHS may refer to:

- James River High School (Buchanan, Virginia), United States
- James River High School (Chesterfield County, Virginia), United States
- Jay M. Robinson High School, Concord, North Carolina, United States
- John Rennie High School, Pointe-Claire, Quebec, Canada
- Julia Richman High School, New York City, United States
- Jesse Remington High School, Candia, New Hampshire, United States
