= CCFR =

CCFR may refer to:

- Canadian Coalition for Firearm Rights, a Canadian gun-rights organization
- Capital City Fire/Rescue, the provider of fire and emergency services in Juneau, Alaska
