= Nathalie Provost =

Canadian gun control advocate and politician (born 1966)

The Honourable Nathalie Provost PC MB MP

Secretary of State (Nature)
- Incumbent
- Assumed office May 13, 2025
- Prime Minister: Mark Carney
- Preceded by: Position established

Member of Parliament for Châteauguay—Les Jardins-de-Napierville
- Incumbent
- Assumed office April 28, 2025
- Preceded by: Brenda Shanahan

Personal details
- Born: 1966 (age 59–60) Quebec, Canada
- Party: Liberal
- Known for: Gun control activism

Nathalie Provost PC MB MP (born 1966) is a Canadian politician, gun control advocate, and engineer who has served as a member of Parliament (MP) for Châteauguay—Les Jardins-de-Napierville since 2025. She is a member of the Liberal Party.

Provost survived being shot during the 1989 École Polytechnique massacre. She and other survivors founded the PolySeSouvient gun-control advocacy group, for which she served as a spokesperson. She has continued as an activist for gun control and to reduce violence against women. From 2017 to 2019 Provost served as vice-chair of the Government's Canadian Firearms Registry, but resigned because of belief they were not strong enough. She works as an engineering civil servant for the government of Quebec. With Provost's permission, Canadian author Louise Penny featured her as a character in her 2022 novel A World of Curiosities.

She was elected to the House of Commons in the 2025 Canadian federal election.

== Biography ==
Provost was born in Quebec. She was a 23-year old mechanical engineering student at École Polytechnique de Montréal in 1989. On 6 December of that year, Marc Lépine, armed with a rifle, interrupted a lecture, shot the ceiling, and ordered the approximately 50 male students to leave the room. Nine female students, including Provost, remained. Lépine told the women he was there to fight feminism; Provost responded that they were students, not activists. Lépine shot the women, killing six and injuring three, including Provost. She received four gun shots to her head and leg, and cautioned her fellow injured students to play dead. The gunman continued to other floors, killing a total of 14 women, including one staff person, and wounding 14 others (ten women, four men) before committing suicide. This was the deadliest mass murder in modern Canadian history until the 2020 Nova Scotia attacks. Provost returned to her studies one month later. She completed her bachelor's degree in 1990, and earned her master's degree at the same university.

Provost worked as an engineer in the civil service for the Government of Quebec. In 2022, Provost received an honorary doctorate degree from École Polytechnique. The university credited her for her “remarkable achievements, driven by uncommon determination and social values, [and] for the example of audacity that she embodies for the new generation of engineers in Quebec, in Canada and around the world.” She has four children. She has had to deal with post-traumatic stress disorder (PTSD) since the attacks. In 2022, writer Louise Penny sought and obtained Provost's permission to include her as a character in her novel A World of Curiosities.

Since April 28, 2025, she has been elected as the Member of Parliament for Châteauguay—Les Jardins-de-Napierville. On May 13, she was appointed by Mark Carney as Secretary of State (Nature). At the time of the 2025 Canadian federal election, she lived in Saint-Lambert, Quebec.

== Activism ==
After the shooting, Provost embraced the feminist label, describing it as a "beautiful title." With other survivors of the attack, she formed the gun-control advocacy group PolySeSouvient, and became one of the two spokespersons. In 2009, she advocated to retain the Canadian Firearms Registry, opposing plans that were eventually implemented by the Government of Stephen Harper in 2012. In 2017, Provost was appointed as vice-chair of the Canadian Government's Canadian Firearms Registry; she resigned in 2019, citing dissatisfaction with what she described as the government's timid approach to gun control. In 2021, she urged federal politicians to reject firearms regulations proposed by the Liberal government, which she considered to be too weak. In 2022, Provost denounced the Canadian Coalition for Firearm Rights for using the discount code "POLY" for its online sales. Her complaints prompted a barrage of online abuse, including sexual and violent threats.

== Political career ==
On March 21, 2025, Provost announced that she would run as the Liberal Party of Canada candidate in Châteauguay—Les Jardins-de-Napierville in the 2025 Canadian federal election. She was elected, winning 45% of the vote, by more than 10 000 votes.

== Electoral record ==
2025 Canadian federal election: Châteauguay—Les Jardins-de-Napierville
Party	Candidate	Votes	%	±%	Expenditures
Liberal	Nathalie Provost	28,224	45.16	+8.65	$63,004.97
Bloc Québécois	Patrick O'Hara	18,160	29.06	–7.54	$49,915.05
Conservative	David De Repentigny	13,538	21.66	+9.50	none listed
New Democratic	Hannah Wolker	1,377	2.20	–5.61	$0.00
Green	Martine Desrochers	773	1.24	–0.25	$0.00
People's	Nicolas Guérin	429	0.69	–3.09	$1,604.27
Total valid votes		62,501	98.46	+0.59	$137,365.48
Total rejected ballots		975	1.54	–0.59	
Turnout		63,476	69.36	+6.77	
Eligible voters		91,519			
Liberal notional gain from Bloc Québécois		Swing		+8.09	
Source: Elections Canada
Note: number of eligible voters does not include voting day registrations.

== See also ==
- Firearms regulation in Canada
