= PolySeSouvient =

Canadian gun control organization

- PolyRemembers
- Formation: 1989
- Type: Non-profit
- Purpose: Gun Ownership Regulation
- Location: Canada
- Coordinator: Heidi Rathjen
- Spokesperson: Nathalie Provost
- Website: polysesouvient.ca

PolySeSouvient (French for PolyRemembers) is a Canadian gun-control advocacy organization.

The non-profit organization was founded by survivors of the Ecole Polytechnique massacre. One of them, Nathalie Provost serves as the spokesperson. Heidi Rathjen is the groups coordinator.

== History ==
PolySeSouvient was founded by survivors of the Ecole Polytechnique massacre.

In 2019, the group called for a ban on semi automatic rifles (including legal hunting and sport shooting rifles of law abiding citizens), a ban on handgun imports to Canada, and a ban on handgun manufacturing in Canada. In 2020, the group was served a cease and desist document and threatened with litigation by gun manufacturing company Marstar. An image of a Marstar product had featured a 2019 letter from the group.

In 2022, the organization was critical of the Canadian Coalition for Firearm Rights for their use of the POLY sales promotional discount code. The same year the group advocated to the Government of Canada to adapt upcoming gun control legislation to ban a wider range of firearms. In February 2023, the group spoke in the Canadian parliament and told politicians that disinformation was confusing the issue of gun control. In May 2023, the group was critical of Canadian Prime Minister Justin Trudeau for what it described a reneging on gun-control promises and advised him that they considered him unwelcome at the upcoming memorial to the massacre.

== See also ==
- Firearms regulation in Canada
