= Francine Pelletier (journalist) =

Canadian journalist

- Born: 1955 (age 70–71)
- Occupations: Feminist, journalist
- Relatives: Pol Pelletier (sister)

Francine Pelletier (born c. 1955) is a journalist based in Montreal, Quebec, Canada. She is the founder of a feminist newspaper, La Vie en Rose, and has written for La Presse, Le Devoir, and the Montreal Gazette.

After the École Polytechnique massacre on December 6, 1989, in which 14 women were murdered by Marc Lepine, she lobbied for the public release of the gunman's suicide letter. It was leaked to her on November 22, 1990, and was subsequently published in La Presse. The letter included a list of 19 prominent Quebec feminists whom Marc Lepine had apparently wished to target, and her name was one of those listed. She has been a commentator on the PBS program, The Editors, and has worked as a correspondent for CBC Television on The National Magazine and as a co-host of The Fifth Estate. Since leaving the CBC, Pelletier has become a documentary filmmaker, having produced Monsieur, a film about former Quebec Premier Jacques Parizeau.

In 2015 she was awarded the Michener-Deacon fellowship in Journalism Education and began teaching in the Journalism Department at Montreal's Concordia University. In 2020 she was named the department's journalist-in-residence.
