= Canadian Coalition for Firearm Rights =

Canadian organization

- Formation: Autumn 2015
- Founder: Tracey Wilson
- CEO & Executive Director: Rod Giltaca
- Website: firearmrights.ca

The Canadian Coalition for Firearm Rights (CCFR) is a Canadian gun rights organization.

== History ==
The organization was founded by Tracey Wilson in the autumn of 2015 shortly after the Liberal Party of Canada won the 2015 Canadian federal election, splintering from the National Firearms Association. Rod Giltaca was the CCFR's first president and currently is the CEO and executive director. Giltaca said he shot his first firearm in San Diego, California, and later "shifted [his] entire career to the firearms industry".

In 2018, a Liberal fundraising email described the group as "Canada's NRA", referring to the National Rifle Association of America. The CCFR responded by stating the Liberal Party was "using scare tactics like implying American lobby groups or politics are influencing Canadians or American style-gun laws are imminent". The Liberal Party later stated that the reference to the NRA was about the Canadian gun lobby as a whole, rather than the CCFR specifically.

In 2019, the organization encouraged members to make official complaints about medical doctor Najma Ahmed who was advocating for legal prohibition of assault rifles and pistols in Canada. The College of Physicians and Surgeons of Ontario rejected the complaints against Ahmed as "an abuse of process."

The group is opposed to the federal government's Bill C-21 amendments for gun control. In November 2022 Giltaca said, "[the government's] plan is to ban all firearms from civilian ownership in Canada," adding that ideology was driving the ban.

=== Online code "POLY" controversy ===
In November 2022, the group promoted an online shopping discount code "POLY" in relation to the PolySeSouvient gun-control group. The group's name derives from the 1989 École Polytechnique massacre, in which a gunman killed fourteen women. Massacre survivor and gun-control advocate Nathalie Provost criticized The CCFR on December 2, describing the code as "incredibly disrespectful".

On December 3, 2022, Montreal Canadiens goaltender Carey Price posted on Instagram, expressing his support for the group and opposition to the Bill C-21 (firearms legislation) amendments. Two days later Price tweeted that he disagreed with the group's use of the promotional code. Price then said he still stood by his opinion on the amendments, but acknowledged and apologized on Instagram to those impacted by the massacre. On December 5, 2022, The group released a statement, clarifying that the code was a reference to PolySeSouvient's Twitter account, and not the Polytechnique shooting.

On December 18, 2022, the Montreal Gazette issued a retraction of, and apology for, statements it previously published in a column that indicated the group's promo code was meant to reference and make fun of the mass shooting at École Polytechnique. It said that the promo code was instead a reference to PolySeSouvient's Twitter account.

=== Court challenges ===
The CCFR is the lead plaintiff taking the government of Canada to court to challenge the use of Orders in Council to change the classification of many common and widely used firearms.

On 30 October 2023, the Federal Court dismissed the application for judicial review. Honourable Madam Justice Kane ruled against the CCFR. In her decision, the Order in Council and Regulations were not ultra vires, the Governor in Council did not sub-delegate classification authority to the Royal Canadian Mounted Police, the Governor in Council does not owe a duty of procedural fairness to Canadians, nor did the regulations infringe on the Charter of Rights and Freedoms or the Canadian Bill of Rights.

The CCFR appealed that decision, relying on many of the same arguments as they did before the Federal Court. On 15 April 2025, a panel of three Federal Court of Appeal justices ruled against CCFR and others. The decision includes many references to upper court decisions especially around administrative law.

Beginning in June 2025 the CCFR applied to the Supreme Court of Canada for leave to appeal the Federal Court of Appeal decision. On 19 March 2026, the Court granted leave, with a hearing date to be determined. Only a small number of cases are heard each sitting, which suggests the justices are interested in some of the CCFR's arguments. The Attorneys General of Alberta, Saskatchewan and Ontario have received intervenor status, and applications from other groups and individuals are pending. An intervenor cannot present new arguments, but bring information to the Court which is relevant to the appeal.

== Organization ==
The organization rejects the politicization of gun control legislation and calls for evidence-led solutions.

The group was described in the book Firearms Law and the Second Amendment as an "activist group". In 2021, The Walrus described the CCFR as "Canada’s most prominent pro-gun group".
