= National Day of Remembrance and Action on Violence Against Women =

Day of commemoration in Canada

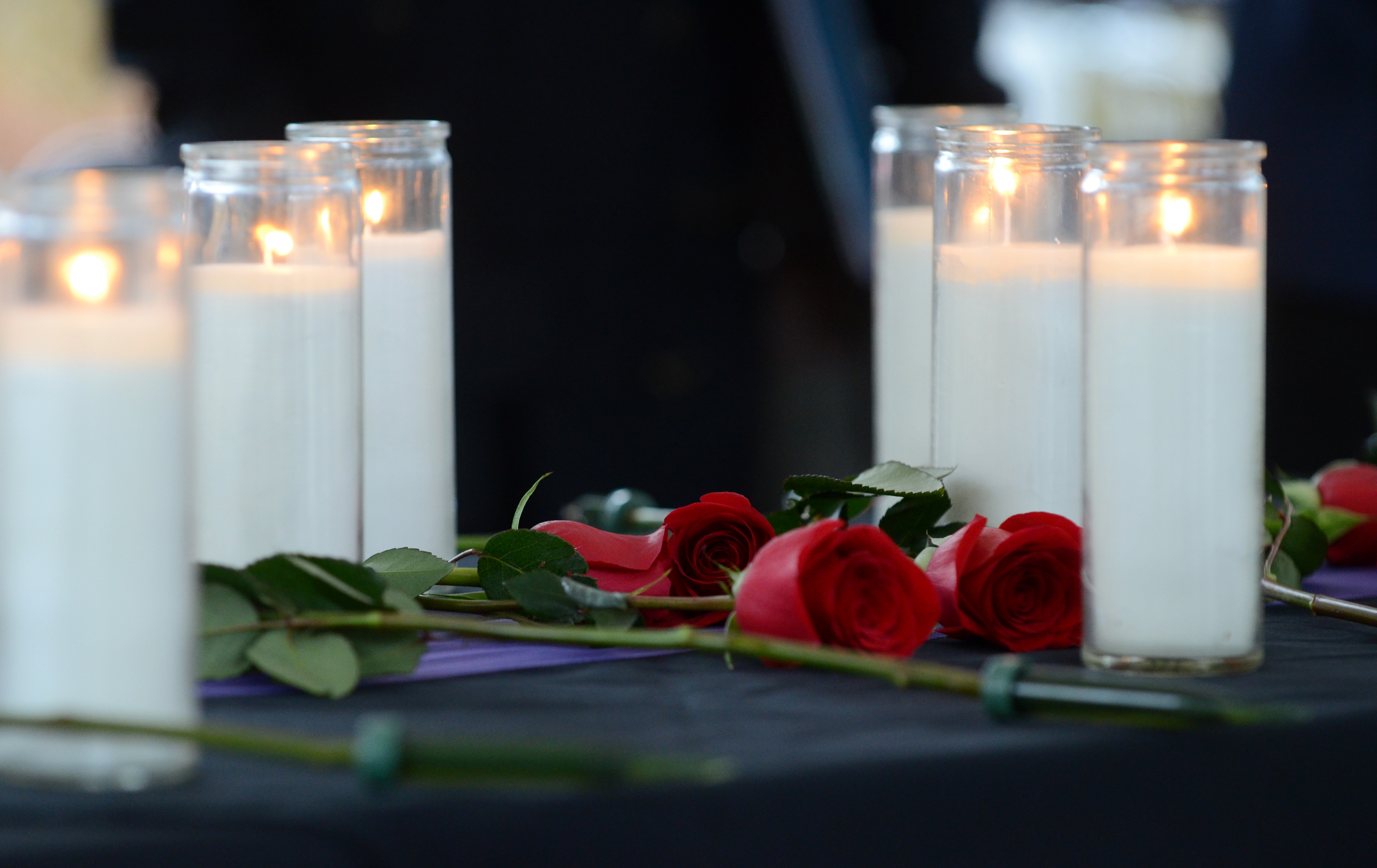
- Candles and roses at a 2016 candlelight vigil at the University of the Fraser Valley
- Genre: Violence against women
- Date: December 6
- Frequency: Annually
- Location: Canada
- Years active: 35
- Inaugurated: 1991 by the Parliament of Canada
- Organizer: Parliament of Canada
- Website: National Day of Remembrance and Action on Violence Against Women

The National Day of Remembrance and Action on Violence Against Women (French: Journée Nationale de Commémoration et d'Action Contre la Violence à l'Égard des Femmes), also known informally as White Ribbon Day (Jour du Ruban Blanc), is a day commemorated in Canada each December 6, the anniversary of the 1989 École Polytechnique massacre, in which armed student Marc Lépine murdered fourteen women and injured fourteen others in the name of "fighting feminism". The commemoration date was established by the Parliament of Canada in 1991. The legislation was introduced in the House of Commons as a private member's bill by Dawn Black, Member of Parliament for New Westminster-Burnaby, British Columbia, and received all-party support.

Canadian flags on all federal buildings – including the Peace Tower on Parliament Hill in Ottawa, Ontario – are flown at half-mast on December 6. Canadians are encouraged to observe a minute of silence on December 6 and to wear a white ribbon (or a purple ribbon) as a commitment to end violence against women.

The victims of the 1989 massacre were Geneviève Bergeron, 21; Hélène Colgan, 23; Nathalie Croteau, 23; Barbara Daigneault, 22; Anne-Marie Edward, 21; Maud Haviernick, 29; Barbara Klucznik, 31; Maryse Laganière, 25; Maryse Leclair, 23; Anne-Marie Lemay, 22; Sonia Pelletier, 23; Michèle Richard, 21; Annie St-Arneault, 23; and Annie Turcotte, 20.

In response to the event, many Canadians have worked hard to establish memorial sites all across the country to ensure that people will become more aware of the incident that occurred. This is intended to force society to recognize how often violence occurs towards women and to appreciate the lives of the women who were killed. Feminism advocates and activists trying to stop violence directed towards women have shown concern about using the massacre to solely represent violence against women.

The news took the ascribed perspective of the killer having mental problems. This effectively dismissed feminist analyses stating that "the killer went to this extent to proclaim his anti-feminist opinion."

== See also ==
- International Day for the Elimination of Violence against Women on November 25
- Public holidays in Canada
- Stop Violence Against Women, a campaign of Amnesty International
- White Ribbon Campaign
