= Anora (disambiguation) =

Anora is a 2024 drama film.

Anora may also refer to:

- Añora, city located in the province of Córdoba, Spain
- Anora Group, Finnish beverage company
- Anora Davlyatova (born 1999), Uzbekistani rhythmic gymnast

== See also ==
- Anorak (disambiguation)
