= Stop Violence Against Women =

Campaign by Amnesty International

Stop Violence Against Women was a worldwide campaign of Amnesty International to counter violence against women launched in 2004 by Amnesty International.

== History ==
It was started on 5 March 2004, in preparation before International Women's Day. It is one of Amnesty's key campaigns. Amnesty considers that domestic and sexual violence are serious breaches of human rights and Amnesty should confront them. The campaign focuses on ending impunity for those who commit such violence, by pressuring governments to prosecute individuals and change laws to protect women. Amnesty is particularly concerned at the incidence of rape and other violence committed in conflicts such the Second Congo War and Darfur conflict.

The actor Patrick Stewart shared his own experience of seeing his mother abused by his father. He witnessed helpers asking his mother what she had done to provoke him. Stewart put all of the blame on his father. His contribution was lauded after his death as it gave survivors courage.

== See also ==
- National Day of Remembrance and Action on Violence Against Women (White Ribbon Campaign)
- International Day for the Elimination of Violence against Women
- Declaration on the Elimination of Violence Against Women
