= Adam Kelly Morton =

Canadian actor, writer, producer and teacher

- Born: January 9, 1973 (age 53); Notre-Dame-de-Grâce, Montreal
- Education: John Rennie High School
- Alma mater: York University; Concordia University; John Abbott College
- Occupations: Actor; writer; producer; teacher

Adam Kelly Morton, also known as Adam Kelly, is a Canadian actor, writer, producer and teacher.

== Background ==
Born in the Notre-Dame-de-Grâce district of Montreal, Kelly grew up in Pierrefonds. He first began stage acting while attending John Rennie High School, where he met future collaborators Donovan King and Tetsuro Shigematsu. Electing to pursue health science at John Abbott College and then biology at Concordia University, Kelly continued performing, co-founding the Wahoo Family Theatre Company with Donovan King and with future sketch comedy partner Matthew Legault.

Having completed his Bachelor of Science degree in 1995, Kelly returned to Concordia in 1996 to begin his formal actor training in Theatre Performance, working alongside future singer-songwriters Pierre Gage and Martha Wainwright. While attending Concordia, he was invited by former classmate Tetsuro Shitematsu to play in his feature film Yellow Fellas. Kelly also appeared in Canada: A People's History as a boisterous, Irish supporter of Daniel Tracey.

In 1999, Kelly was accepted into the Master of Fine Arts Acting program at York University, Toronto. There, he performed in a workshop production of Colleen Murphy's The Piper (with future film star Rachel McAdams) and studied under David Rotenberg, David Smukler and Dean Gilmour, among others. As a second year thesis assignment, Kelly created a play that would eventually become The Anorak, his critically acclaimed one-man-show about the École Polytechnique massacre and the life and death of Marc Lépine.

== Career ==
Upon completion of his MFA in acting, Kelly was given the title role in Necessary Angel's main-stage production of The Piper at the Factory Theatre. The play received unenthusiastic reviews. After workshop productions of his play The Anorak at York, and at Queen's University, Kelly returned to Montreal.

After making its debut at Zeke's Gallery and subsequent performances at McGill University, The Anorak was received with controversy in Montreal, particularly in the French-language media. However, critics received the play with favorable reviews bestowing it a Montreal English Critic's Circle Award (MECCA). Kelly was then commissioned by CBC Radio for a national radio documentary on The Current. The play was performed by Kelly in the CBC studios, and the performance was listened to by Sylvie Haviernick, sister of Maud, who was killed in the massacre. Her reaction to the play was supportive.

After seeing his play in 2006, actress Karine Vanasse and Maxime Rémillard of Remstar Productions recruited Kelly to collaborate with director Denis Villeneuve on his film Polytechnique, released in 2009.

For the 20th anniversary of the massacre, Kelly performed for the first time in a French version of the play (translated by Geneviève Charbonneau) at Université de Montréal. The French-language debut took place in 2008 at Université Laval. In 2013, the play made its UK debut in London at The Lion & Unicorn Theatre, and will make its off West End debut at the Hope Theatre, Islington in 2014.

The Anorak was remounted in Montreal for the 25th anniversary of the Polytechnique massacre, with Kelly (Morton) again performing.

In 2005, Kelly co-founded the Dancing Cock Brothers comedy troupe, who would make several Fringe Festival and other live appearances to mixed reviews. The DCBs also made a cameo in the comedy documentary film Let's All Hate Toronto directed by Albert Nerenberg.

Kelly was executive producer of Montreal Hearts, a comedy-drama web series nominated for an Indie Soap Award (Fan's Choice) and named on Funny or Die for their Best Videos of 2010. He also acted in the series.

In 2012, his first short film "Communication Policy" was an official selection at Rome Film Festival. His next short film "Foreign Language" premiered at the Soho International Film Festival and was an Official Selection at the Rochester International Film Festival, where it was selected for the Best of Fest list in 2013. In 2015, his film "Adiel & Didier" screened at the Beloit International Film Festival in the Comedy Shorts category.

As a prose writer, Kelly was first published in Menda City Review. and has since been published in numerous online and print journals, many of which appear in his first collection of stories, Harmony Street.

Kelly is also the founder of I.O. Acting & Creative Studio, based in Montreal, where he teaches acting, screenwriting, and film production for various levels of experience and age groups.

== Personal life ==
Adam Kelly currently resides in Montreal, Canada with his wife Kim Gartshore and their four children. Adam considers himself to be a big Dungeons & Dragons enthusiast and has been playing for over 30 years.
