= Marc Lépine =

Canadian mass murderer (1964–1989)

- Lépine in 1989
- Born: Gamil Rodrigue Liess Gharbi; October 26, 1964; Montreal, Quebec, Canada
- Died: December 6, 1989 (aged 25); Montreal, Quebec, Canada
- Cause of death: Suicide by gunshot
- Known for: Perpetrator of the École Polytechnique massacre
- Motive: Antifeminism; Misogyny

Details
- Date: December 6, 1989
- Locations: Montreal, Quebec, Canada
- Target: Women at École Polytechnique de Montréal
- Killed: 14
- Injured: 14
- Weapons: Ruger Mini-14; Hunting knife

Marc Lépine (French: [maʁk lepin]; born Gamil Rodrigue Liess Gharbi; October 26, 1964 – December 6, 1989) was a Canadian mass murderer who perpetrated the École Polytechnique massacre, where he murdered 14 women and wounded another 10 women and four men (Note: Note: Many sources state 13 were wounded, but the Coroner's report and the police officer responsible for the investigation state that 14 were wounded.) at École Polytechnique de Montréal, on December 6, 1989.

Lépine was born in Montreal, Quebec, to French Canadian nurse Monique Lépine and Algerian businessman Rachid Gharbi, who was abusive towards Lépine. After his parents separated when he was seven, his mother returned to nursing to support her children. Lépine and his younger sister lived with other families who cared for them during the week, only seeing their mother on weekends. Lépine was considered bright but withdrawn, and he had difficulties with peer and family relationships. At the age of 14, he changed his name, giving "hatred of his father" as the reason.

Lépine's application to the Canadian Forces was rejected. In 1982 he began a science program at a college, switching to a more technical program after one year. In 1986 he dropped out of the course in his final term, and was subsequently fired from his job at a hospital due to his poor attitude. Lépine began a computer programming course in 1988, and again abandoned it before completion. He twice applied for admission to the École Polytechnique, but lacked two required compulsory courses.

Lépine had long complained about women working in "non-traditional" jobs. After several months of planning, including the legal purchase of a Ruger Mini-14, he entered the École Polytechnique on the afternoon of December 6, 1989, separated the men from the women in a classroom, and shot the women, while yelling, "I hate feminists". He said he was "fighting feminism". He moved into other parts of the building, targeting women, before fatally shooting himself. His suicide note blamed feminists for ruining his life.

Lépine's actions have been variously ascribed from a psychiatric perspective with diagnoses such as a personality disorder, psychosis, or attachment disorder, noting societal factors such as poverty, isolation, powerlessness, and violence in the media. The massacre is regarded by criminologists as an example of a hate crime against women. Feminists and government officials considered it a misogynist attack and an example of the larger issue of a high frequency of violence against women. December 6 is now observed in Canada as a National Day of Remembrance and Action on Violence Against Women.

== Life ==
=== Childhood ===
Marc Lépine was born Gamil Rodrigue Liess Gharbi on October 26, 1964, in Montreal, Quebec, the son of Algerian immigrant Rachid Liess Gharbi and French-Canadian nurse Monique Lépine. Gamil's sister, Nadia, was born in 1967.

Rachid was a mutual funds salesman and was travelling in the Caribbean at the time of his son's birth. During his absence, Monique discovered evidence that her husband had been having an affair. Rachid was a non-practising Muslim, and Monique a former Catholic nun; she had rejected organized religion after she left the convent. Their son was baptized a Catholic as an infant, but received no religious instruction during his childhood; his mother described her son as "a confirmed atheist all his life".

Instability and violence marked the family: they moved frequently. Much of young Gamil's early childhood was spent in Costa Rica and Puerto Rico, where his father worked for a Swiss mutual funds company.

The family returned to Montreal permanently in 1968, shortly before a stock market crash led to the loss of much of the family's assets. Rachid was an authoritarian, possessive and jealous man, frequently violent towards his wife and children. He had contempt for women and believed that they were intended only to serve men. He required his wife to act as his personal secretary, slapping her if she made any errors in typing, and forcing her to retype documents in spite of the cries of their toddler. He was also neglectful and abusive towards his children, particularly his son, and discouraged any tenderness as he considered it spoiling.

In 1970, following an incident in which Rachid struck Gamil so hard that the marks on his face were visible a week later, Monique decided to leave. The legal separation was finalized in 1971, and the divorce in 1976. Following the separation, Gamil lived with his mother and younger sister Nadia; soon after, their home and possessions were seized when Rachid defaulted on mortgage payments. Gamil was afraid of his father, and at first saw him only on weekly supervised visits. The visits ended quickly, as Rachid ceased contact with his children soon after the separation. Gamil never saw his father again. He later would refuse to discuss him with others.

Rachid made only two child support payments. Monique returned to nursing to support her family. She started taking further courses to advance her career. During this time the children lived with other families during the week, seeing their mother only on weekends. Concerned about her children and parenting skills, she sought help for the family from a psychiatrist at Sainte-Justine Hospital in 1976; the assessment concluded there was nothing wrong with the shy and withdrawn Gamil, but recommended therapy for his sister Nadia, who was challenging Monique's authority.

=== Adolescence ===
After the divorce became final in 1976, the Lépine children, then aged 12 and 9, returned to live with their mother, who had been promoted to director of nursing at a Montreal hospital. In 1977 the family moved to a house purchased in the middle-class Montreal suburb of Pierrefonds. Gamil attended junior high and high school, where he was described as a quiet student who obtained average to above average marks. He developed a close friendship with another boy, but he did not fit in with other students. Taunted as an Arab because of his name, as a teenager he legally changed it to "Marc Lépine", citing his hatred of his father as the reason for taking his mother's surname. (Note: Although he began the process at 14, his name was not legally changed until after January 9, 1981.) Lépine was uncommunicative and showed little emotion. He suffered from low self-esteem, exacerbated by his chronic acne. Family relations remained difficult as his younger sister Nadia publicly humiliated him about his acne and his lack of girlfriends. Lépine fantasized about her death, and on one occasion made a mock grave for her. He was overjoyed when in 1981 she was placed in a group home because of her delinquent behaviour and drug abuse.

Seeking a good male role model for Lépine, his mother arranged for a Big Brother. For two years, the experience proved positive as Lépine, often with his best friend, enjoyed the time with photography and moto-cross motorcycles. However, in 1979, the meetings ceased abruptly when the Big Brother was detained on suspicion of molesting young boys. Both Lépine and his Big Brother denied that any molestation had occurred.

Lépine owned an air rifle as a teenager, which he used to shoot pigeons near his home with his friend. They also enjoyed designing and building electronic gadgets. Lépine developed an interest in World War II and an admiration of Adolf Hitler, and enjoyed action and horror movies. He also took considerable responsibility at home, including cleaning and doing repairs while his mother worked.

Lépine applied to join the Canadian Forces as an officer cadet in September 1981 at the age of 17, but was rejected during the interview process. He later told his friend it was because of difficulties accepting authority. In his 1989 suicide letter, he noted that he had been found to be "anti-social". An official statement from the military after the massacre stated that Lépine had been "interviewed, assessed and determined to be unsuitable".

In 1982, when Lépine was 18, his family moved to Saint-Laurent, closer to his mother's work and to Lépine's new CEGEP. He lost contact with his school friend soon after the move. This period marks the beginning of the seven-year period which he described in his suicide note as having "brought [him] no joy".

In August 1982, Lépine began a two-year pre-university course in pure sciences at Cégep de Saint-Laurent. He failed two courses in the first semester but improved his grades considerably in the second semester. He worked part-time at the hospital where his mother worked, serving food and doing custodial duties. Lépine was seen as nervous, hyperactive, and immature by his colleagues, who mocked him. He developed an attraction to another employee but he was too shy to act on his feelings. He once reportedly told her, "I've asked a lot of girls out, but they have all refused. I know so many girls, but they won't go out with me. I'm not good looking."

=== Adulthood ===
After a year at college, he switched from the university-destined science program into electronics technology, a three-year technical program geared more towards immediate employment. His teachers remembered him as being a model student, quiet, hardworking, and generally doing well in his classes, particularly those related to electrotechnology. There was an unexplained drop in his marks in the fall 1985 term. In February 1986, during the last term of the program, he suddenly and without explanation stopped attending classes, as a result failing to complete his diploma.

Lépine moved out of his mother's home into his own apartment, and in 1986 he applied to study engineering at École Polytechnique de Montréal. He was admitted on the condition that he complete two compulsory courses, including one in solution chemistry. He never did so.

In 1987, Lépine was fired from his job at the hospital for aggressive behaviour, as well as disrespect of his superiors and carelessness in his work. He was enraged at his dismissal, and at the time described a plan to commit a murderous rampage and then commit suicide. Lépine's friends noted that he became unpredictable, flying into rages when frustrated.

In the fall of 1987, in order to complete his college diploma, Lépine took three courses, obtaining good marks in all of them. In February 1988, he began a course in computer programming at a private college in downtown Montreal, funding his studies with government student loans. He moved into a downtown apartment with his old high school friend, and in the winter of 1989 took a CEGEP night course in solution chemistry, a prerequisite course for the École Polytechnique.

Lépine wanted a girlfriend, but was generally ill at ease around women. He tended to boss women around and show off his knowledge in front of them. He spoke out to men about his dislike of feminists, career women and women in traditionally male occupations, such as the police force, stating that women should remain in the home caring for their families. Lépine applied again to the École Polytechnique in 1989; however, his application was rejected as he still lacked required courses. In March 1989, he abandoned the course in computer programming, though he performed well in the CEGEP course. He obtained 100% in his final exam. In April 1989, he met with a university admissions officer and complained about how women were taking over the job market from men.

== Suicide statement ==
The following is a translation of the suicide letter written by Lépine on the day of the shooting.

Forgive the mistakes, I had 15 minutes to write this. See also Annex.

Please note that if I commit suicide today 89-12-06 it is not for economic reasons (for I have waited until I exhausted all my financial means, even refusing jobs) but for political reasons. Because I have decided to send the feminists, who have always ruined my life, to their Maker. For seven years life has brought me no joy and being totally blasé, I have decided to put an end to those viragos.

I tried in my youth to enter the Forces as an officer cadet, which would have allowed me possibly to get into the arsenal and precede Lortie in a raid. They refused me as [I was] asocial. I therefore had to wait until this day to execute my plans. In between, I continued my studies in a haphazard way for they never really interested me, knowing in advance my fate. Which did not prevent me from obtaining very good marks despite my theory of not handing in work and the lack of studying before exams.

Even if the Mad Killer epithet will be attributed to me by the media, I consider myself a rational erudite that only the arrival of the Grim Reaper has forced to take extreme acts. For why persevere to exist if it is only to please the government. Being rather backward-looking by nature (except for science), the feminists have always enraged me. They want to keep the advantages of women (e.g. cheaper insurance, extended maternity leave preceded by a preventative leave, etc.) while seizing for themselves those of men.

Thus it is an obvious truth that if the Olympic Games removed the Men-Women distinction, there would be women only in the graceful events. So the feminists are not fighting to remove that barrier. They are so opportunistic they [do not] (Note: Note: Original French is "Elles sont tellement opportunistes qu'elles ne négligent pas de profiter". A negative is missing from the published translation.) neglect to profit from the knowledge accumulated by men through the ages. They always try to misrepresent them every time they can. Thus, the other day, I heard they were honoring the Canadian men and women who fought at the frontline during the world wars. How can you explain [that then, since] (Note: Note: Original French is "Comment expliquer cela alors que les femmes...". The inaccurate published translation was "...explain then that...") women were not authorized to go to the frontline??? Will we hear of Caesar's female legions and female galley slaves who of course took up 50% of the ranks of history, though they never existed. A real Casus Belli.

Sorry for this too brief letter.

Marc Lépine

The letter is followed by the list of nineteen names, with a note at the bottom:

"They nearly died today. The lack of time (because I started too late) has allowed these radical feminists to survive.
Alea iacta est."

== Massacre ==
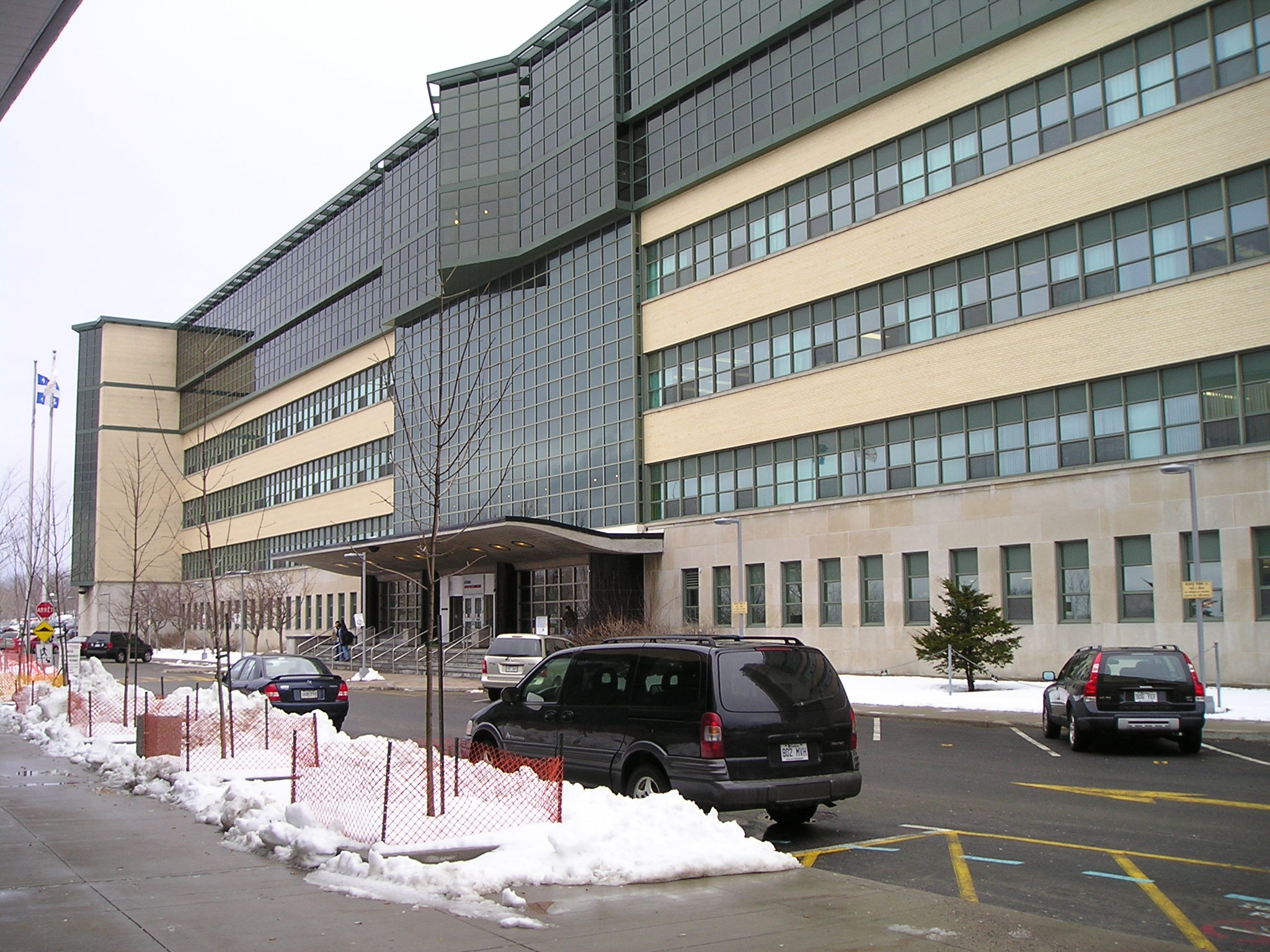
Exterior of École Polytechnique de Montréal

The massacre appeared to have been planned for several months. In August 1989 Lépine picked up an application for a firearms-acquisition certificate, and in mid-October he received his permit. On November 21, 1989, he purchased a Ruger Mini-14 semi-automatic rifle at a local sporting goods store. Between October and December 1989 he was seen at least seven times at the École Polytechnique. Four days before the shooting, Lépine brought his mother a present, though it was several weeks before her birthday; he also brought a note and two bags of belongings, which she did not discover until long after the shooting. Lépine had previously always been very punctual paying his rent, but had not done so in December 1989.

On December 6, 1989, Lépine walked into the École Polytechnique. He entered a second-floor classroom where he separated the men and women, and ordered the approximately 50 men to leave. Claiming that he was fighting feminism, he shot the nine women who remained, killing six and injuring the rest. The men waited outside as their female classmates were killed. After this, Lépine moved to other areas of the building, including the cafeteria, corridors and another classroom. He killed a total of 14 women (12 engineering students, one nursing student, and one university employee), and injured four men and 10 more women before turning the gun on himself. The event was later described as a "pseudo-community" type of "pseudo-commando" murder–suicide, in which the perpetrator targets a specific group, usually in a public place, and intends to die in "a blaze of glory".

A three-page suicide letter was found in the pocket of Lépine's jacket. The letter was never officially made public and only portions were initially released by police. It was leaked in November 1990 to Francine Pelletier and published in the newspaper La Presse. In his letter, Lépine claimed political motives, blamed feminists for ruining his life, and expressed admiration for Denis Lortie, who had mounted an attack on the National Assembly of Quebec in 1984 for political reasons, killing three Quebec government employees. The letter also contained a list of nineteen Quebec women whom Lépine labeled as "radical feminists" and appeared to target for killing. Another letter, written to a friend, promised the explanation to the massacre lay by following clues left in Lépine's apartment. The hunt led only to a suitcase of computer games and hardware.

Lépine was buried in the Notre Dame des Neiges Cemetery in Montreal, a few blocks from where he committed the massacre.

=== Rationale ===
A police psychiatrist who interviewed Lépine's family and entourage, and who had access to his letters, suggested that he may have had a serious personality disorder. He chose the multiple homicide/suicide strategy (killing oneself after killing others) that is a characteristic of this disorder. The psychiatrist noted "extreme narcissistic vulnerability" as shown by fantasies of power and success, combined with high levels of self-criticism and difficulties dealing with rejection and failure. Feelings of powerlessness and incompetence were compensated for by a violent and grandiose imaginary life. Other psychiatrists suggested that Lépine was psychotic, having lost touch with reality as he tried to erase the memories of a brutal and absent father, while at the same time unconsciously identifying with a violent manhood that dominates women. Other theories were that Lépine's experiences of abuse as a child had caused brain damage or led him to feel victimized as he faced losses and rejections in his later life.

Lépine's mother speculated that he may have suffered from attachment disorder due to the abuse and sense of abandonment he had suffered in his childhood. She also wondered whether Lépine viewed her as a feminist, and that the massacre might have been an unconscious attempt to get revenge for her neglect while she pursued her career and for his sister's taunts. Others take a less individualistic approach. Many feminists and governmental officials view it as an illustration of misogynistic violence against women. Criminologists consider the massacre as an example of a hate or bias crime against women. In retrospect, the massacre has been suggested as the first incel terrorist attack. Lépine is viewed as a hero by certain incels and men's rights activists. Others wondered if Lépine's actions were the result of societal changes that had led to increased poverty, powerlessness, individual isolation or increased violence in the media and in society.

== Memorial ==
Canadians mark the day of the killings with a National Day of Remembrance and Action on Violence Against Women. In 2008, Monique Lépine published Aftermath, a memoir of her own journey through the grief and pain of the incident. She had stayed silent until 2006, when she decided to speak out for the first time in the wake of that year's Dawson College shooting.

== In popular culture ==
Lépine's life and death was dramatized by Adam Kelly in his controversial play The Anorak.

Lépine was portrayed by Maxim Gaudette in Denis Villeneuve's 2009 film Polytechnique, although the film never refers to Lépine by name. Gaudette won the Genie Award for Best Supporting Actor for his portrayal of Lépine.

== Sources ==
- Lépine, Monique; Gagné, Harold (2008). Aftermath. Viking Canada. ISBN 978-0-670-06969-9.
