= The Anorak =

Stage play by Adam Kelly

The Anorak is a play by Adam Kelly about the École Polytechnique massacre and the life and death of Marc Lépine. It is a 90-minute dramatic monologue told from the killer's point of view. In the performances, audience members are separated between men and women, with the actor speaking to the men exclusively for the first 80 minutes. Only during the detailed description of the massacre are the women in the audience addressed. After each performance, Kelly would hold an optional forum with the audience to discuss issues brought up in the play, including gun control and violence against women.

Although the play caused controversy, particularly in French-language media, it has been critically acclaimed, and was awarded a Montreal English Critics Circle Award (MECCA).

A French translation of the play, by Geneviève Charbonneau, premiered at Laval University in Québec City in 2008, with Gaétan Rancourt in the lead role, and Kelly acted in the French version for the 20th anniversary of the massacre at Université de Montréal.

For his work on The Anorak, Kelly was recruited to collaborate with Denis Villeneuve on his film Polytechnique.

Productions have taken place in Montreal, Toronto, and London, with the play's Off West End premiere taking place at The Lion & Unicorn Theatre in Camden in 2013, with Felix Brunger in the lead role and directed by Matthew Gould.

The play was remounted in Montreal for the 25th anniversary of the Polytechnique massacre, with Kelly performing.
