= John Rennie High School =

- École secondaire John Rennie
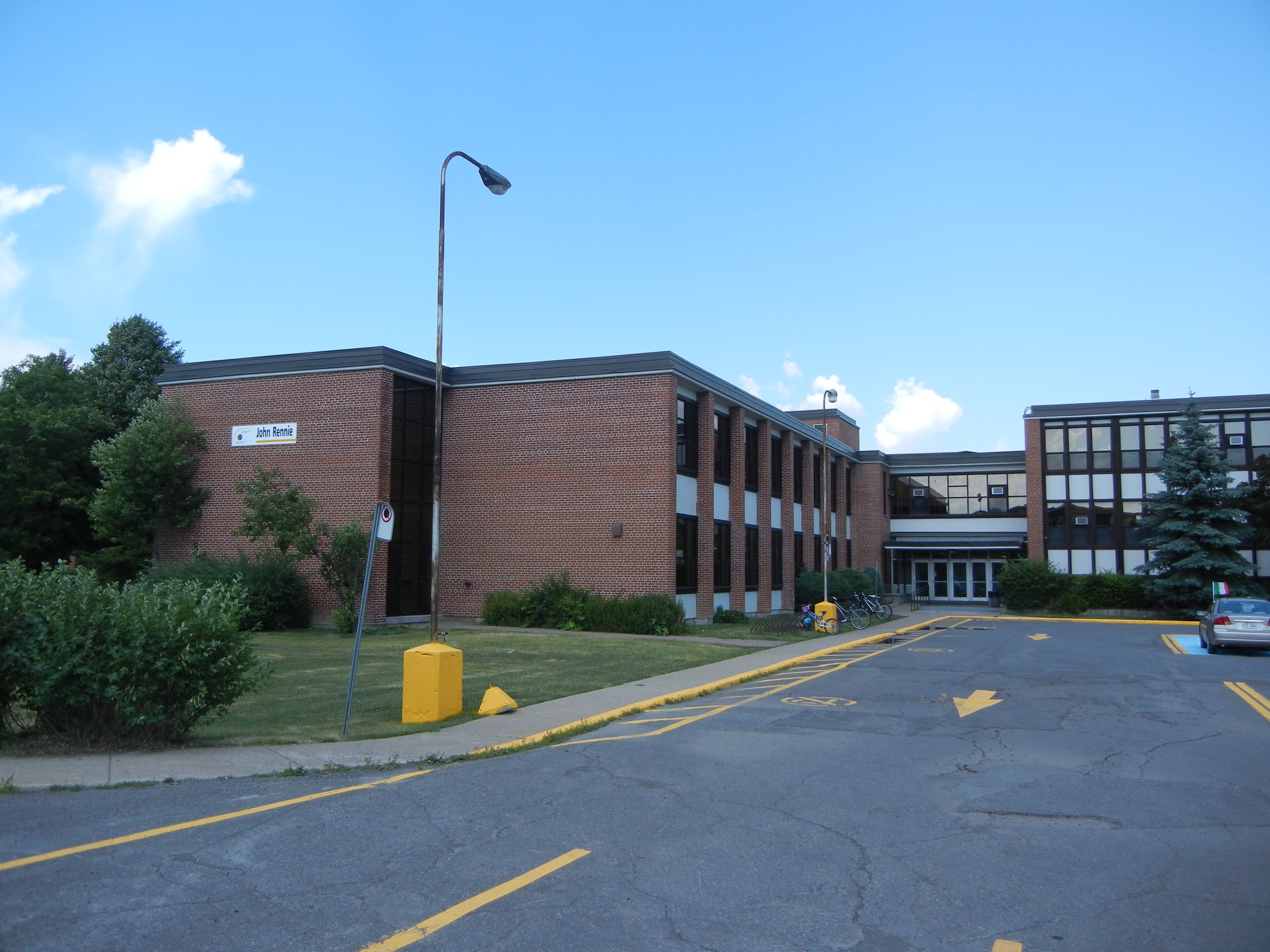

Location
- 501 St. John's Boulevard; Pointe-Claire, Quebec, H9R 3J5; Canada; 45°27′00.4″N 73°49′04.2″W

Information
- School type: Public, High School
- Founded: 1955
- School board: Lester B. Pearson School Board
- School number: 954403
- Principal: Dion Joseph
- Grades: Secondary I-V
- Enrollment: 1450 (2011)
- Language: English
- Colours: Black and Gold
- Team name: Renegades, Tigers
- Website: johnrennie.lbpsb.qc.ca

John Rennie High School (JRHS) (French: École secondaire John Rennie) located in Pointe-Claire, Quebec, Canada, is an English-language public high school that opened in 1955. The school was named after John Rennie (1904–1952), the Union Nationale Member of the Legislative Assembly of Quebec for Huntingdon from 1947 to 1952.

Pointe-Claire was and remains in a riding that has voted for the Quebec Liberal Party; thus, when local representatives made their case to Premier Maurice Duplessis for the building of a new high school to meet the needs of the burgeoning postwar school population, Duplessis's stipulation for the funding was for the building to be named after his recently deceased fellow Union Nationale MNA and longtime party fundraiser. However, that was not completely a partisan political decision, as Rennie had been the assistant director of Protestant schools in Pointe-Claire from 1930 to 1936, as well as the principal of the Valois Park and Cedar Park schools.

The school is administered by the Lester B. Pearson School Board.

== Extracurricular and programs ==
John Rennie High School has taken part in the Canadian Improv Games for the past ten years, winning the Montreal games for eight of those years. Originally, every year it supported just one team, but as of 2004-2005, it started supporting a second team, sending both teams to compete in the CIG. John Rennie is proud to be the 2011 Canadian Improv Games' National champions. "We Need a Ride Home" has brought great pride to John Rennie by being the first Montreal team in over 10 years to bring home the gold.

The Sport-Études program was launched at John Rennie High School in the 2000-2001 school year. The Sport Federations involved have concluded protocols with the Lester B. Pearson School Board and John Rennie High School, local clubs/associations; and Ministry of Education, Leisure and Sports (MELS). Entrance criteria and practice requirements are set by the individual Federations. For the 2010-2011 school year, John Rennie's Sport-Études program offers boxing, diving, figure skating, gymnastics, hockey, ringette, soccer, basketball, swimming, synchronized swimming, tennis, track & field and water polo.

Actors' Studio, formerly run by Louise Chalmers before her retirement in 2010, has produced many theatrical productions, including those written by Shakespeare, each with its own modern twist.

Other programs include Academic Plus & Renniessance.

As a member of Peaceful Schools International which declares a commitment to creating and maintaining a culture of peace within the school, John Rennie High School was the first school in Quebec to accommodate the award-winning experiential programme Challenge Day (2008). The Challenge Day mission is to provide youth and their communities with an opportunity to demonstrate the possibility of love and connection through the celebration of diversity, truth, and full expression. John Rennie brought Challenge Day back in 2011 for three days. The Respect Committee of the school will work to endorse the principles of peace and connection among the John Rennie High School community.

In 2023 allegations arose of racism in John Rennie High school in its hockey program when a student was wrongfully expelled from the hockey program after receiving anti-Black racial slurs. After years of racial slurs the student according to reports "instead of being protected, their son was expelled from the program and the perpetrators were let off the hook."

== Expansion ==
In 1969, John Rennie was expanded nearly doubling its size and enrollment. A new cafeteria and a new library surrounded a new courtyard (now known as the Haden Garden), two new gymnasiums were added, and a state of the art auditorium/theater and music rooms were built. Also added were new science labs, more classroom space, art studios and a vocational-technical hall featuring wood, metal, and automobile repair shops. Due to the split-level design of the original building, the floors of the new two-story addition were floors "2" and "4".

== Notable alumni ==
- Adam Kelly, actor, writer, and filmmaker
- Donovan King, performance activist and experimental theatre artist
- Tetsuro Shigematsu, radio broadcaster and filmmaker
- Jonas Tomalty, rock musician
- Simon Després, National Hockey League (NHL) Pittsburgh Penguins
- Vincent Lecavalier, NHL Philadelphia Flyers
- Mike Matheson, drafted by NHL Florida Panthers
- Tony Proudfoot, Canadian Football League Montreal Alouettes
- Ian Turnbull, NHL Toronto Maple Leafs
- Peter Worrell, NHL Florida Panthers
- Wendy Crewson, actress
- David I. McKay, CEO of Royal Bank of Canada
- Jacqueline Simoneau, Team Canada Artistic Swimmer, 3 time Olympian Rio 2016 Tokyo 2021 Paris 2024
- Nathan Zsombor-Murray, Team Canada Diver, 2 time Olympian (Class of 2021) Tokyo 2021 Paris 2024
- Serena Browne, Team Canada Water Polo Player (Class of 2021) Paris 2024
