= Anorak Magazine =

British kid's magazine

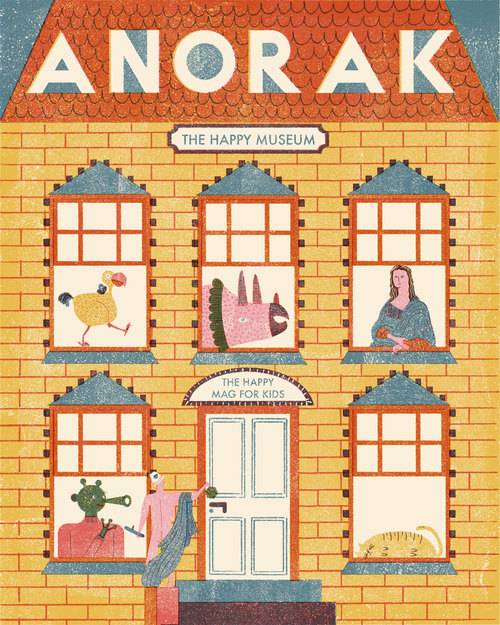
- Anorak Issue 39
- Categories: Children's magazine
- Frequency: Quarterly
- Founder: Cathy Olmedillas
- First issue: 2006
- Country: United Kingdom
- Based in: London
- Language: English
- Website: anorakmagazine.com

Anorak Magazine is an independent illustrated magazine self-described as the 'happy mag for kids'. It is published quarterly by the United-Kingdom based Studio Anorak.

== Publication history ==
Anorak was launched in 2006 by Anorak Studio. Located in the United Kingdom, the publishing house was founded in 2006 by Cathy Olmedillas, formerly of The Face and Sleazenation. The magazine, billed as the 'happy mag for kids' is a unisex publication aimed at children between 6 and 12 years old. Olmedillas developed the magazine after realizing, as a new mother, that there weren't any titles targeted at children that she wanted to read with her son. As of 2017, the magazine has a per issue print run of 15,000.

Each issue is themed and designed to be kept and collected, like magazines of the past. Anorak features original artwork by artists including Jayde Perkin who points to the "range of styles" included in the magazine's art direction as a reason both adults and children can enjoy the publication. In 2014, The Guardian called the publication one of the Top Five magazines for children.

Anorak Studio produces a sister magazine, Dot, which is aimed at children under five years of age. In 2013, it also published The Big Book of Anorak, a selection of items from back issues of the magazine.
