= École Polytechnique massacre =

1989 mass shooting in Montreal, Canada

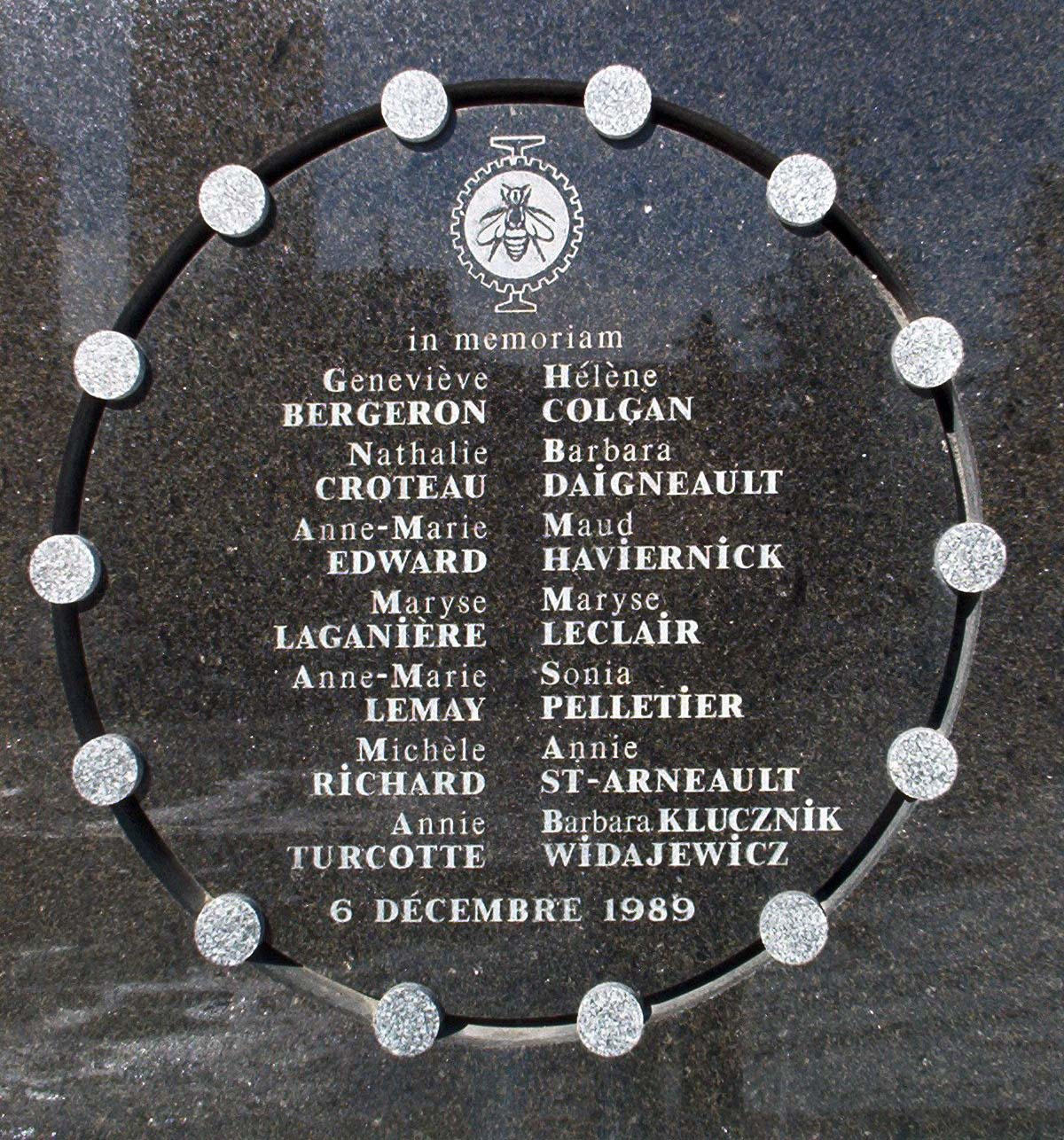
- Plaque at École Polytechnique commemorating victims of the massacre
- Location: 45.504675°N 73.612899°W; Montreal, Quebec, Canada
- Date: December 6, 1989; 36 years ago 5:10 pm – 5:30 pm (EST)
- Target: Women at École Polytechnique de Montréal
- Attack type: Mass shooting; school shooting; murder-suicide; hate crime; femicide
- Weapons: Ruger Mini-14; 6-inch hunting knife
- Deaths: 15 (including the perpetrator)
- Injuries: 14
- Perpetrator: Marc Lépine
- Motive: Misogyny, antifeminism

The École Polytechnique massacre (French: tuerie de l'École polytechnique), also known as the Montreal massacre, was a mass shooting that occurred on December 6, 1989, at the École Polytechnique de Montréal in Montreal, Quebec, Canada. Fourteen women were fatally shot in the misogynistic, antifeminist attack; another ten women and four men were injured. Among the wounded was the eventual gun control advocate and politician Nathalie Provost. It is the deadliest school shooting in Canadian history.

On December 6, 1989, Marc Lépine, armed with a legally-obtained semi-automatic rifle and a hunting knife, entered a mechanical engineering class at the École Polytechnique. He ordered the women to one side of the classroom, and instructed the men to leave. After claiming that he was "fighting feminism," he shot all nine women in the room, killing six. The shooter then moved through corridors, the cafeteria, and another classroom, specifically targeting women to shoot for just under 20 minutes. He killed a further eight women before shooting and killing himself with his rifle. It was the deadliest mass shooting in Canada until the 2020 Nova Scotia attacks.

After the attack, Canadians debated various interpretations of the events, their significance, and the shooter’s motives. The massacre is now widely regarded as an anti-feminist attack and representative of wider societal violence against women; the anniversary of the massacre is commemorated as the National Day of Remembrance and Action on Violence Against Women.

The incident led to more stringent gun control laws in Canada, and increased action to end violence against women. It also resulted in changes in emergency services protocols to shootings, including immediate, active intervention by police. These changes were later credited with minimizing casualties during incidents in Montreal and elsewhere.

== Timeline ==
Sometime after 4 p.m. on December 6, 1989, Marc Lépine arrived at the building housing the École Polytechnique, an engineering school affiliated with the Université de Montréal, armed with a Ruger Mini-14 rifle and a hunting knife. He had legally purchased the gun less than a month earlier on November 21 in a Checkmate Sports store in Montreal, saying that he was going to hunt small game. Investigators learned that he had been in and around the École Polytechnique building at least seven times in the weeks leading up to December 6.

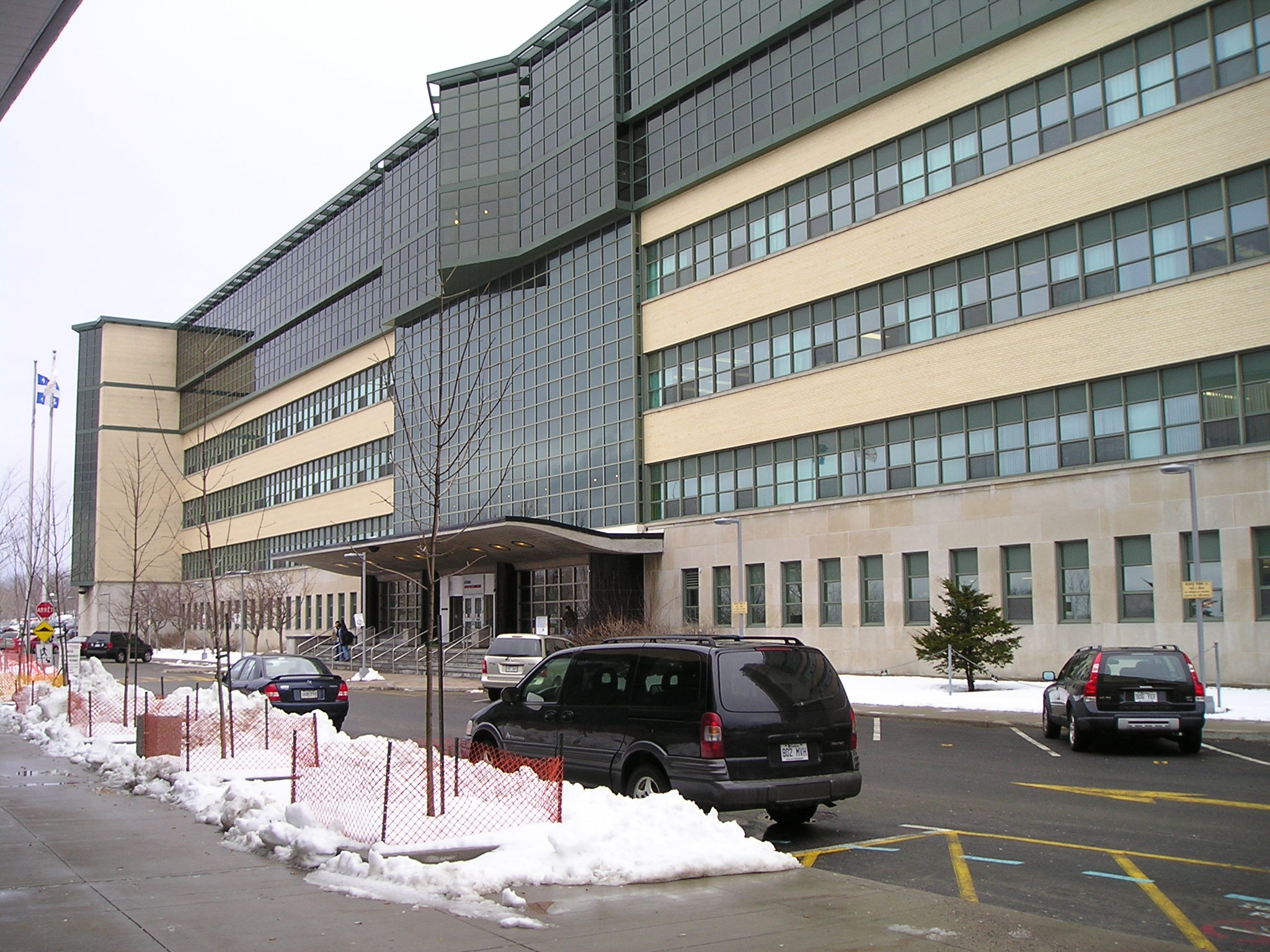
Exterior of École Polytechnique de Montréal

The gunman first sat in the office of the registrar on the second floor, where he was seen rummaging through a plastic bag. He did not speak to anyone, even when a staff member asked if she could help him. He left the office and was seen in other parts of the building before he entered a second-floor mechanical engineering class of about sixty students at about 5:10 p.m. After approaching the student giving a presentation, he asked everyone to stop everything and ordered the women and men to opposite sides of the classroom. No one moved at first, believing it to be a joke, until he fired a shot into the ceiling.

After separating the students, Lépine ordered the estimated fifty men to leave the room. He asked the women whether they knew why they were there; instead of replying, a student asked who he was. He said that he was fighting feminism. One of the students, Nathalie Provost, protested that they were women studying engineering, not feminists fighting against men or marching to prove that they were better. He responded by opening fire on the students from left to right, killing six—Hélène Colgan, Nathalie Croteau, Barbara Daigneault, Anne-Marie Lemay, Sonia Pelletier, and Annie St-Arneault—and wounding three others, including Provost. Before leaving the room, he wrote the word "shit" twice on a student project.

The gunman continued into the second-floor corridor and wounded three students before entering another room where he twice attempted to shoot a female student. When his weapon failed to fire, he entered the emergency staircase where he was seen reloading his gun. He tried to return to the room he had just left, but the students had locked the door. He failed to open it although he fired three shots into the door. Moving along the corridor, he shot at others, wounding one, and approached the financial services office. There he shot and killed Maryse Laganière through the window of the door she had just locked.

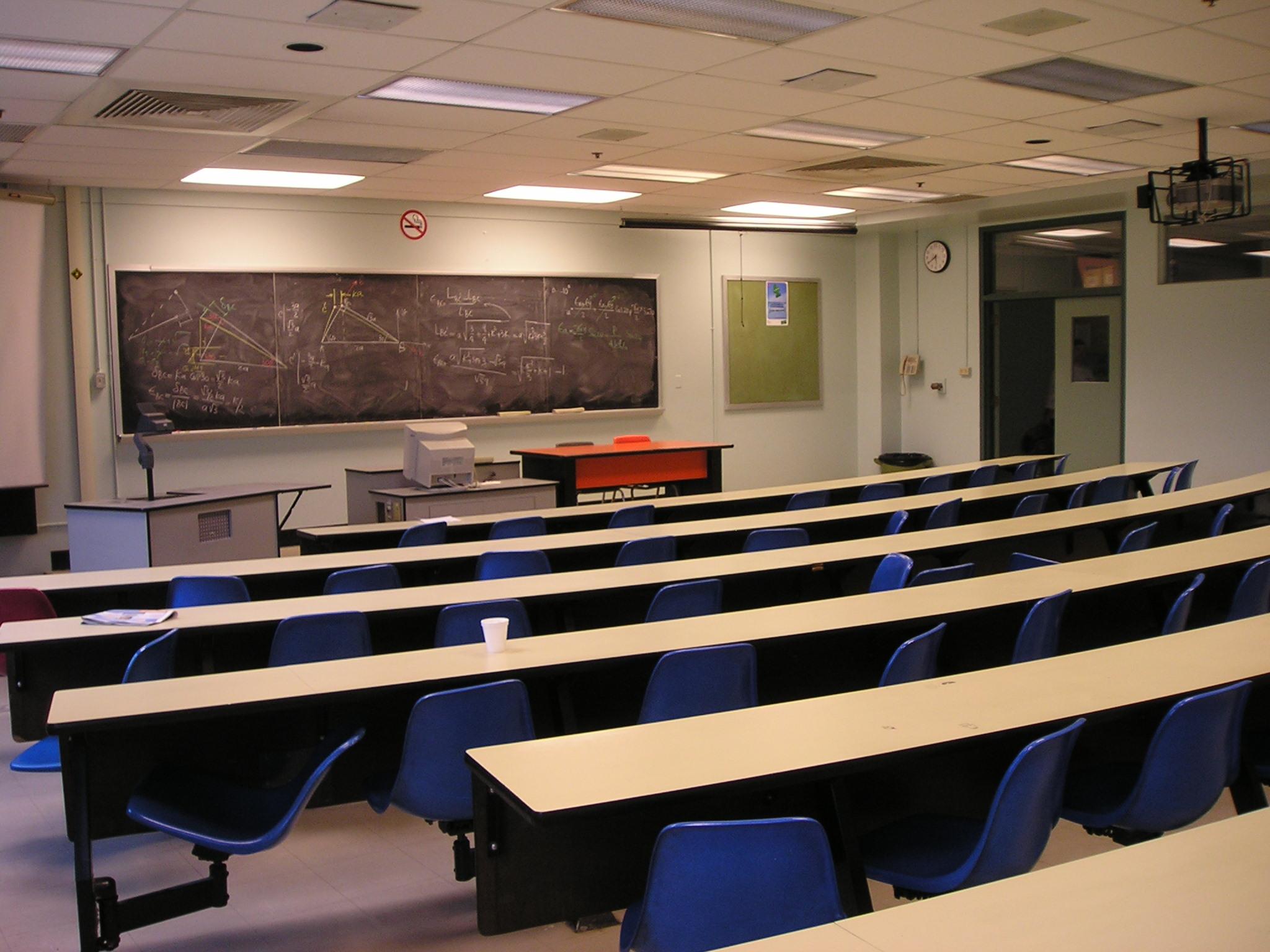
The third floor classroom in the École Polytechnique in which the attack ended

The gunman went down to the first-floor cafeteria, in which about 100 people were gathered. He shot nursing student Barbara Maria Klucznick near the kitchens and wounded another student, and the crowd scattered. Entering an unlocked storage area at the end of the cafeteria, the gunman shot and killed Anne-Marie Edward and Geneviève Bergeron, who were hiding. He told a male and female student to come out from under a table; they complied and were not shot.

The shooter walked up an escalator to the third floor, where he shot and wounded one female and two male students in the hallway. He entered another classroom and told the men to "get out", shooting and wounding Maryse Leclair, who was giving a presentation on a low platform at the front of the classroom. He then fired on students in the front row, killing Maud Haviernick and Michèle Richard, who were trying to escape the room. Other students dove under their desks. The killer moved towards some of the female students, wounding three of them and killing Annie Turcotte. He changed the magazine in his weapon and moved to the front of the class, shooting in all directions. The wounded Leclair asked for help; the gunman stabbed her three times with his hunting knife, killing her. He took off his cap, wrapped his coat around his rifle, said, "Oh shit", and killed himself with a single shot to the head. The attack had taken about 20 minutes; the shooter had fired about 100 rounds and approximately 60 unfired cartridges remained in the boxes he carried.

After briefing reporters outside, Montreal Police director of public relations Pierre Leclair entered the building and found his daughter Maryse's stabbed body.

The Quebec and Montreal governments declared three days of mourning. A joint funeral for nine of the women was held at Notre-Dame Basilica on December 11, 1989, and was attended by Governor General Jeanne Sauvé, Prime Minister Brian Mulroney, Quebec premier Robert Bourassa, and Montreal mayor Jean Doré, along with thousands of other mourners.

== Victims ==
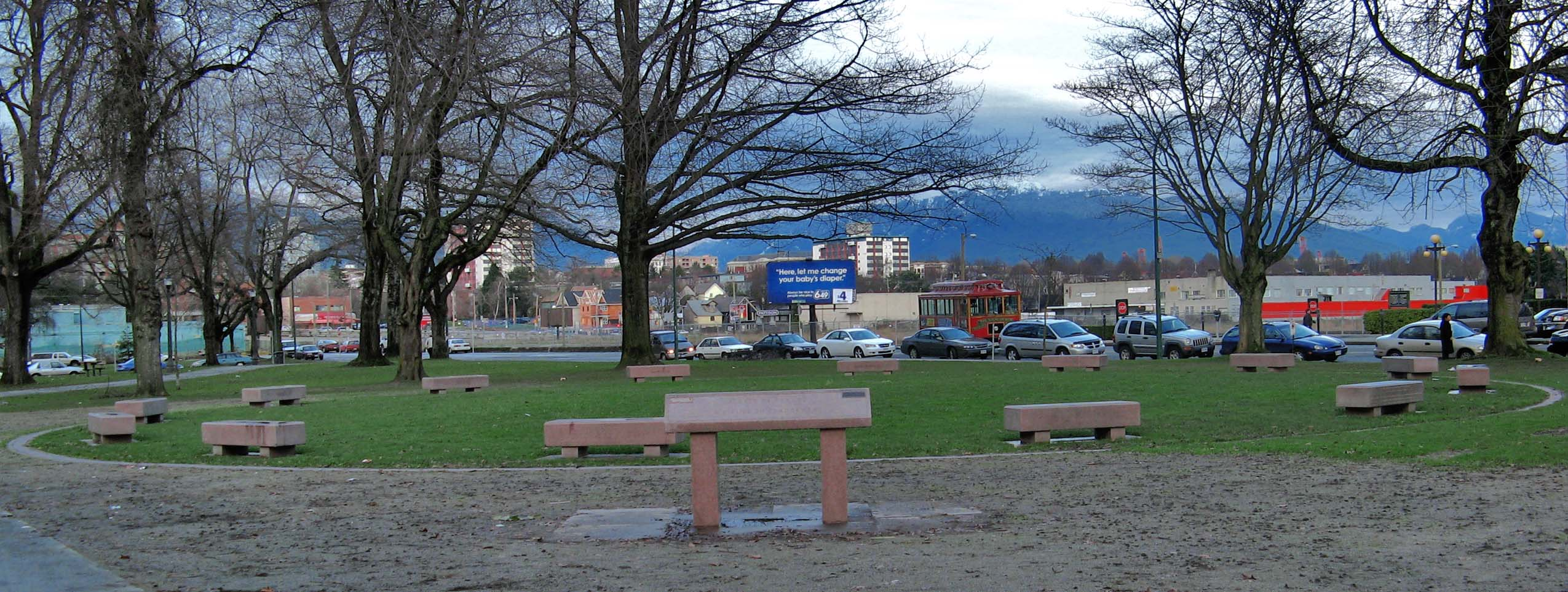
Marker of Change, a memorial consisting of 14 coffin-like benches in Vancouver, British Columbia, by artist Beth Alber

Lépine killed fourteen women (twelve engineering students, one nursing student, and one employee of the university) and injured fourteen others, ten women and four men.

- Geneviève Bergeron (born 1968; aged 21), civil engineering student
- Hélène Colgan (born 1966; aged 23), mechanical engineering student
- Nathalie Croteau (born 1966; aged 23), mechanical engineering student
- Barbara Daigneault (born 1967; aged 22), mechanical engineering student
- Anne-Marie Edward (born 1968; aged 21), chemical engineering student
- Maud Haviernick (born 1960; aged 29), materials engineering student
- Maryse Laganière (born 1964; aged 25), budget clerk in the École Polytechnique's finance department
- Maryse Leclair (born 1966; aged 23), materials engineering student
- Anne-Marie Lemay (born 1967; aged 22), mechanical engineering student
- Sonia Pelletier (born 1961; aged 28), mechanical engineering student
- Michèle Richard (born 1968; aged 21), materials engineering student
- Annie St-Arneault (born 1966; aged 23), mechanical engineering student
- Annie Turcotte (born 1969; aged 20), materials engineering student
- Barbara Klucznik-Widajewicz (born 1958; aged 31), nursing student

== Perpetrator ==
Marc Lépine, né Gamil Gharbi, was born to a French-Canadian mother and an Algerian father on October 26, 1964. His father, a mutual funds salesman, did not consider women to be the equal of men. He was physically and verbally abusive to his wife and son, discouraging tenderness between the two. When Gamil was seven, his parents separated; his father ceased contact with his children soon after. His mother returned to nursing to support the family, and because of her schedule, the children lived with other families during the week. At 14, Gamil changed his name to "Marc Lépine", citing his hatred of his father as the reason for taking his mother's surname. Lépine attempted to join the Canadian Army during the winter of 1980–1981 but, according to his suicide letter, was rejected because he was "anti-social". The brief biography of the shooter that police released the day after the killings described him as intelligent but troubled. He disliked feminists, career women and women in traditionally-male occupations, such as the police force. He began a pre-university CEGEP (college) program in Pure Sciences in 1982, but switched to a three-year vocational program in electronics technology after his first year. He abandoned this program in his final semester without explanation. Lépine applied to the École Polytechnique in 1986 and in 1989 but lacked two CEGEP courses required for admission. He completed one of them in the winter of 1989.

=== Suicide letter ===
On the day of the massacre, Lépine wrote three letters: two were sent to friends, and one was found in an inside pocket of his jacket. The police revealed some details from the suicide letter in the days after the attack, but did not disclose the full text.

The media brought an unsuccessful access to information case to compel the police to release the suicide letter. A year after the attacks, the three-page statement was leaked to journalist and feminist Francine Pelletier. It contained a list of nineteen Quebec women whom Lépine labelled as "radical feminists" and apparently intended to kill. The list included Pelletier, fellow journalists Lise Payette and Janette Bertrand, union leader Monique Simard, politicians Monique Gagnon-Tremblay and Lorraine Pagé, sports commentator Danielle Rainville, and six police officers whom the gunman knew from their playing together on an amateur volleyball team. The letter (without the list of women) was subsequently published in the newspaper La Presse, where Pelletier was a columnist.

In the leaked letter, Lépine wrote that he was rational and blamed 'feminists' for ruining his life. He outlined his reasons for the attack including his anger towards feminists for seeking social changes that "retain the advantages of being women [...] while trying to grab those of the men." He referred to Denis Lortie, a Canadian Armed Forces corporal who had killed three government employees and wounded thirteen others in an armed attack on the National Assembly of Quebec on May 8, 1984.

== Search for a rationale ==
The massacre profoundly shocked Canadians. Government and criminal justice officials feared that extensive public discussion about the massacre would cause pain to the families and lead to more antifeminist violence. As a result, they did not conduct a public inquiry, and Lépine's suicide letter was not released. In addition, although an extensive police investigation into the perpetrator and the killings took place, the resulting report was not made public although the coroner used it as a source in her investigation. The media, academics, women's organizations, and family members of the victims protested the lack of a public inquiry and paucity of information released.

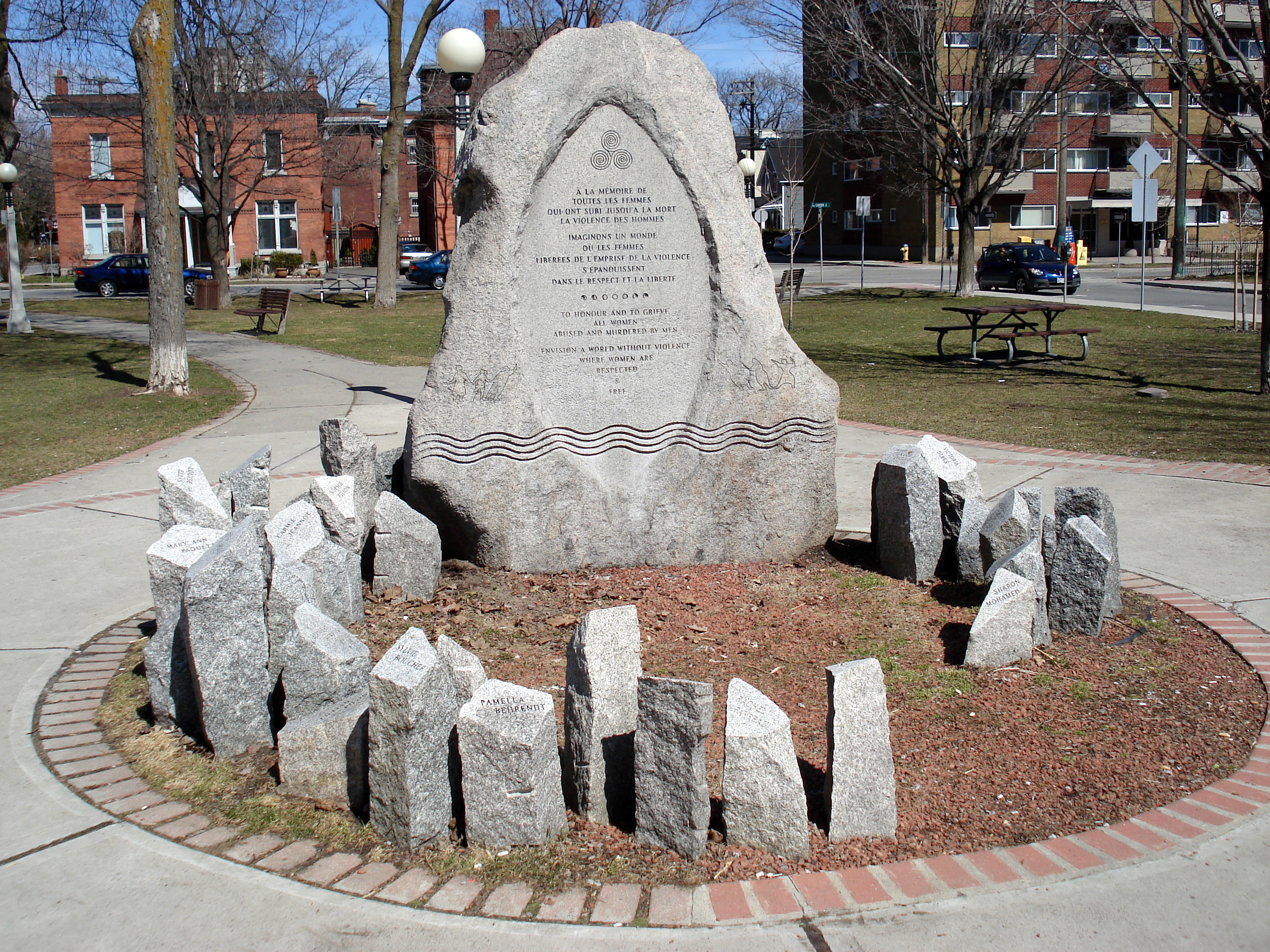
Memorial in Minto Park, Ottawa

The gender of the victims, as well as Lépine's oral statements during the massacre and in the suicide note, have resulted in the event being seen as an antifeminist attack and as an example of the wider issue of violence against women. Initially, however, politicians and the media downplayed the antifeminism of the attack. Political leaders such as Robert Bourassa, Claude Ryan, and Jacques Parizeau spoke about "victims" and "youth" rather than "women" or "girls". The television journalist Barbara Frum pleaded against interpreting the massacre as antifeminist or as violence against women. She asked why people were "diminishing" the tragedy by "suggesting that it was an act against just one group?"

As predicted by the shooter in his suicide letter, some observers saw the event was the isolated act of a madman. A psychiatrist interviewed the gunman's family and friends, and examined his writings as part of the police investigation. He noted that the perpetrator defined suicide as his primary motivation, and that he chose a specific suicide method, namely killing oneself after killing others (multiple homicide/suicide strategy), which is considered a sign of a serious personality disorder. Other psychiatrists emphasized the traumatic events of his childhood, suggesting that the blows he had received may have caused brain damage, or that he was psychotic, having lost touch with reality as he tried to erase the memories of a brutal (yet largely absent) father while unconsciously identifying with a violent masculinity that dominated women. A different theory was that the shooter's childhood experiences of abuse led him to feel victimized as he faced losses and rejections in his later life. His mother wondered whether her son might have suffered from attachment disorder, due to the abuse and sense of abandonment he had experienced in his childhood.

Others framed the killer's actions as the result of societal changes that had led to increased poverty, powerlessness, individual isolation, and polarization between men and women. Noting the gunman's interest in violent action films, some suggested that violence in the media and in society may have influenced his actions. Following the shootings at Dawson College in September 2006, Globe and Mail columnist Jan Wong controversially suggested that Lépine may have felt alienated from Quebec society as he was the child of an immigrant.

In the years since, however, the attack has been widely acknowledged by the public, governments, and the media as a misogynistic attack on women and on feminism. Scholars consider that the gunman's actions sprang from widespread societal misogyny, including tolerance of violence against women. Criminologists regard the massacre as an example of a hate or bias crime against women, as the victims were selected solely because of their membership in the category of women, and those targeted were interchangeable with other women. They categorize it as a "pseudo-community" type of "pseudo-commando" murder-suicide, in which the perpetrator targets a specific group, often in a public place, and intends to die in "a blaze of glory". The massacre is at times cited as the first incel terrorist attack despite Lépine having not identified as an incel or expressed incel-related views.

Individuals close to the massacre also commented: Lépine's mother wondered if the attack was symbolically directed at her, as some would have classified her as a feminist since she was a single, working mother. Survivor Nathalie Provost who, during and after the attack, denied being a feminist, later claimed this "beautiful title" for herself and stated that the massacre was clearly an anti-feminist act.

== Legacy ==
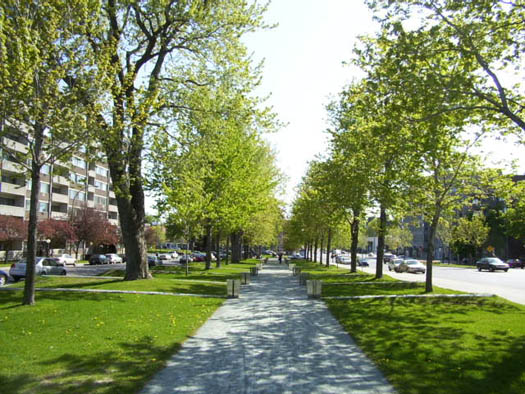
Place du 6-Décembre-1989 (December 6, 1989 Place), Montreal, featuring the artwork Nef pour quatorze reines (Nave for Fourteen Queens) by Rose-Marie Goulet

The injured and witnesses among university staff and students suffered a variety of physical, social, existential, financial, and psychological consequences, including post-traumatic stress disorder (PTSD). At least two students died by suicide afterward, and left notes confirming that their deaths were due to distress caused by the massacre. Nine years after the event, survivors reported still being affected by their experiences, though some of the effects had lessened.

=== Countering violence against women ===
The massacre galvanized the Canadian women's movement, who immediately saw it as a symbol of violence against women. "The death of those young women would not be in vain, we promised", Canadian feminist Judy Rebick recalled. "We would turn our mourning into organizing to put an end to male violence against women."

In response to the killings, a House of Commons Sub-Committee on the Status of Women was created. It released a report "The War against Women" in June 1991, which was not endorsed by the full standing committee. However, following its recommendations, the federal government established the Canadian Panel on Violence Against Women in August 1991. The panel issued a final report, Changing the Landscape: Ending Violence – Achieving Equality, in June 1993. The panel proposed a two-pronged "National Action Plan" consisting of an "Equality Action Plan" and a "Zero Tolerance Policy" designed to increase women's equality and reduce violence against women through government policy. Critics of the panel said that the plan failed to provide a workable timeline and strategy for implementation and that with more than four hundred recommendations, the final report was too diffuse to make an impact.

In Québec, family members of the victims formed a foundation to support organizations combatting violence, particularly violence against women. Survivors and their relatives have continued to speak about the issue. Researchers increased their study of family violence and violence against women. On December 6, 1995, the Quebec government adopted the "Policy on Intervention in Conjugal Violence" with the goal of detecting, preventing and ending domestic violence.

=== Gun control ===
The massacre was a major spur for the Canadian gun control movement. Less than a week after the event, two École Polytechnique professors created a petition addressed to the Canadian government demanding tighter gun control; and more than half a million signatures were collected. Heidi Rathjen, a student who was in one of the classrooms that Lépine skipped, organized the Coalition for Gun Control with Wendy Cukier to pressure for a gun registry and increased firearm regulation. Suzanne Laplante-Edward and Jim Edward, parents of one of the victims, were also deeply involved.

Their activities, along with others, led to the passage of Bill C-17 in 1992, and C-68, commonly known as the Firearms Act, in 1995, ushering in stricter gun control regulations. These new regulations included requirements on the training of gun owners, screening of firearm applicants, a 28-day waiting period on new applicants, rules concerning safe firearm and ammunition storage, the registration of all firearms, magazine capacity limits for semi automatic rifles and pistols, and reclassifying other firearms as restricted or prohibited. In 2009, survivors of the massacre, their families, and Polytechnique students past and present came together to create PolySeSouvient in opposition to legislative actions by Stephen Harper's Conservative government aimed at ending the registration of certain firearms. The long-gun registry was abolished by the Harper government in April 2012, but the Quebec government won a temporary injunction, preventing the destruction of the province's gun registry data, and ordering the continued registration of long guns in Quebec. In March 2015, the Supreme Court of Canada ruled against Quebec, allowing the destruction of all the federal registry data, although Quebec created its own provincial gun registry to replace it. Since its creation, PolySeSouvient, with survivors Nathalie Provost and Heidi Rathjen as spokespersons, has continued to be active in lobbying for stricter gun control and safety in Quebec and Canada. In 2018 Justin Trudeau's Liberal government introduced Bill C-71, which restored the requirement for sales of firearms to be registered, but PolySeSouvient denounced the proposed regulations as ineffective and incomplete. In 2020, in the wake of the mass killing in Nova Scotia, and while also citing the École Polytechnique massacre, Trudeau announced a ban on around 1,500 models of "military-grade assault-style weapons", including the Ruger Mini-14 used for the killings in Montreal. PolySeSouvient welcomed the news, but critiqued the possibility of a grandfathering clause for the weapons as a danger to public safety. On December 5th, 2024, one day before the anniversary of the massacre, the Government of Canada announced that they will be extending the previous 2020 "military-grade assault-style weapons ban" order in council with another OIC. This ban consists of 104 families of firearms, encompassing 324 unique makes and models, some of them semi-automatic. There will also be a voluntary buyback program with an amnesty deadline expiring on October 30, 2025.

=== Emergency services response ===
Emergency response to the shootings was harshly criticized for failures to protect the students and staff. Security guards at the École Polytechnique were poorly trained, organized and equipped. Communication issues at the 911 call centre delayed the dispatch of police and ambulances, who were initially routed to incorrect addresses. The police officers were disorganized and poorly coordinated. They established a perimeter around the building and waited before entering the building. During this period, the gunman killed several women. Three official investigations severely condemned the emergency response.

Subsequent changes to emergency response protocols led to praise of the police handling of 1992 shootings at Concordia University, the Dawson College shooting in 2006 and the 2014 attack on Parliament hill in Ottawa. In these incidents, rapid and immediate intervention by police and improved coordination amongst emergency response agencies were credited with minimizing the loss of life.

== Controversy ==
The feminist movement has been criticized for appropriating the massacre as a symbol of male violence against women. In 1990 journalist Roch Côté responded to the publication of Polytechnique, 6 décembre, a feminist memorial anthology, with an essay entitled Manifeste d'un salaud where he suggested that feminists used the massacre as a chance to unleash "insanities". Critics such as Côté argued that Lépine was a "lone gunman" who does not represent men, and that violence against women is neither condoned nor encouraged officially or unofficially in western culture. In this perspective, feminist memorializing is considered socially divisive on the basis of gender and therefore harmful by bestowing guilt on all men, irrespective of individual propensity to violence against women. Men's rights and anti-feminist commentators argue that feminism has provoked violence against women and, without explicitly condoning the shootings, view the massacre as an extreme expression of men's frustrations. Some incels and men's rights activists view the killer as a hero, glorifying his actions, and threatening violence.

Male survivors of the massacre have been criticised for not intervening to stop the shooter. In an interview immediately after the event, a reporter asked one of the men why they "abandoned" the women when it was clear that his targets were women. René Jalbert, the sergeant-at-arms who persuaded Lortie to surrender, said that someone should have intervened at least to distract Lépine, but acknowledged that "ordinary citizens cannot be expected to react heroically in the midst of terror". Conservative newspaper columnist Mark Steyn suggested that male inaction during the massacre illustrated a "culture of passivity" prevalent among men in Canada, which enabled the shooting spree. Male students and staff expressed feelings of remorse for not having attempted to prevent the shootings. This issue has been strongly rejected by the Polytechnique student community. Nathalie Provost, one of the female survivors, said that she felt that nothing could have been done to prevent the tragedy and that her fellow students should not feel guilty. Asmaa Mansour, another survivor, emphasized the actions of the men in saving her life and in helping the injured.

== Commemoration ==
Since 1991, the anniversary of the massacre has been designated the National Day of Remembrance and Action on Violence Against Women, intended as a call to action against discrimination against women. A White Ribbon Campaign was launched in 1991 by a group of men in London, Ontario in the wake of the massacre, for the purpose of raising awareness about the prevalence of male violence against women, with the ribbon symbolizing "the idea of men giving up their arms".

Nef pour quatorze reines (Nave for fourteen queens), detail

The Place du 6-Décembre-1989 in the Côte-des-Neiges/Notre-Dame-de-Grâce borough of Montreal was created as a memorial to the victims of the massacre. Located at the corner of Decelles Avenue and Queen Mary Road, a short distance from the university, it includes the art installation Nef pour quatorze reines (Nave for Fourteen Queens) by Rose-Marie Goulet. Originally described as a memorial for a "tragic event", in 2019, the plaque was changed to reflect indicate that the attack was anti-feminist and that 14 women were killed. Events are held across the country each year on December 6 in memory of the slain women and numerous memorials have been built. The memorial in Vancouver sparked controversy because it was dedicated to "all women murdered by men", which critics say implies all men are potential murderers. Women involved in the project received death threats and the Vancouver Park Board banned future memorials that might antagonize other groups.

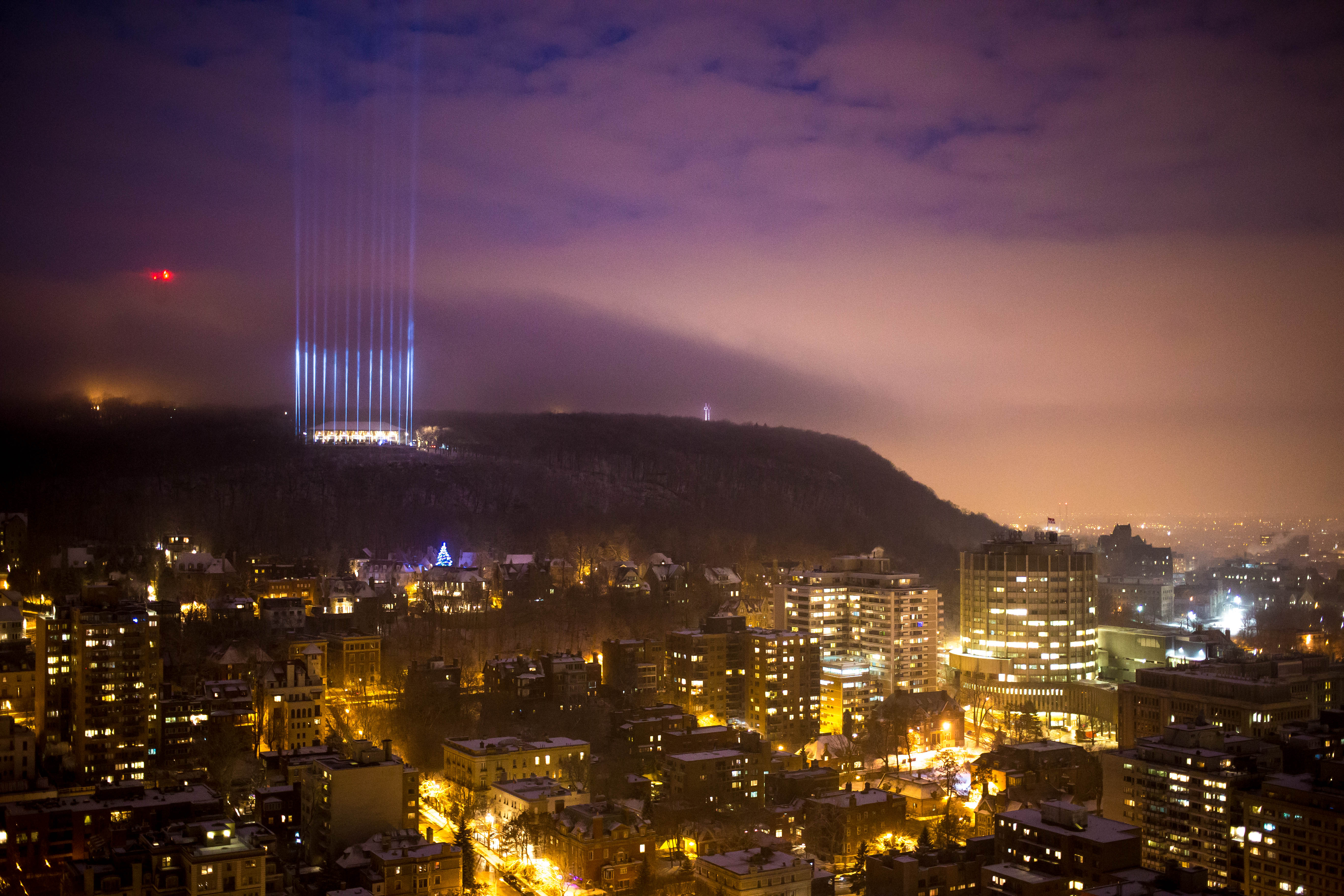
On the 25th anniversary, fourteen light beams representing the 14 victims shine from Mount Royal.

Since the commemorative ceremony on the 25th anniversary of the massacre in 2014, fourteen searchlights representing the women killed have been installed annually on the summit of Mount Royal. At 5:10 p.m., the time when the attack began, the name of each victim is read, and a light beam is projected upward into the sky. The event is attended by local and national leaders.

The Anne-Marie Edward Science Building at John Abbott College, constructed in 2013, was named in honour of one of the victims who had attended the CEGEP before going on to university. The Order of the White Rose was established in 2014 to provide a $30,000 national scholarship for female engineering graduate students. The selection committee is chaired by Michèle Thibodeau-DeGuire, the first female graduate of École Polytechnique.

== Commemoration in the arts ==
The event has also been memorialized in plays, movies and music. The widely hailed movie Polytechnique, directed by Denis Villeneuve, was released in 2009 and caused discussion over the desirability of reliving the tragedy in a mainstream film. In a play about the shootings by Adam Kelly called The Anorak, the audience are separated by gender: it was named as one of the best plays of 2004 by the Montreal Gazette. Colleen Murphy's play The December Man (L'homme de décembre) was first staged in Calgary in 2007. Wajdi Mouawad's 2007 play Forêts was inspired by and contains echoes of the tragedy. In 2009 Quebec playwright Gilbert Turp wrote Pur chaos du désir, which examined a marriage breakdown in the aftermath of the Polytechnique killings. Several songs have been written about the events, including "This Memory" by the folk duo the Wyrd Sisters, "Montreal"' by The Tragically Hip and "6 December 1989" by the Australian singer Judy Small.

== See also ==
- 2014 Isla Vista killings, a killing spree in the United States in which misogyny was cited as one of the killer's motives
- 2018 Toronto van attack, another mass killing in Canada motivated in part by misogyny
- Port Arthur massacre, a 1996 shooting in Port Arthur, Tasmania, Australia, that similarly changed opinion on gun control in that country
- Enclave: The Ottawa Women's Monument, a monument in Canada to women killed by men
- List of massacres in Canada
- List of mass shootings in Canada
- List of school shootings in Canada
