= Lövin =

Lövin is a surname. Notable people with the surname include:

- Isabella Lövin (born 1963), Swedish politician
- Björn Lövin, Swedish artist
