= Juliet Cuenco =

Philippine-born activist

Juliet Cuenco was a Philippine-born activist. She was a prominent civic leader based in Canada's capital Ottawa. She worked in the federal multiculturalism secretariat and was a former executive director of the United Council of Filipino Associations in Canada. She was killed by her husband in 1995. Her name was enshrined in the Ottawa Women's Monument.

== Biography ==
Born in Manila, she studied at the University of the Philippines, where she earned her master's degree in urban planning. Then she immigrated to Canada with her family fleeing from Marcos dictatorship. She attended the University of Toronto receiving her MA in education.

In Canada, she worked in the federal multiculturalism secretariat, promoting multiculturalism, race relations and conflict resolution. In 1985, she served as executive director of the United Council of Filipino Associations in Canada (UCFAC), the national body of Filipino groups. She became the secretary of the Canadian Ethnocultural Council in 1988.

As a women's rights advocate, she became part of movement for the rights of care workers. In 1987, she helped Filipino domestic workers in establishing a local support network, the Ottawa Multicultural Homemakers Association. She was involved in various initiatives such as fundraising activities, workshops and lobbying. In 1989, her UCFAC work also helped organize a national dialogue on domestic workers' issues.

As well, she wrote for several publications. She was the Ottawa correspondent of Toronto-based The Philippine Reporter.

== Death ==
On 13 April 1995, Juliet Cuenco was found dead in her Ottawa suburb of Orleans, Ontario. Local police found her battered body in her house following a distress call. Preliminary investigations showed she was hit several times on the head with a blunt object. Her husband Arturo ("Art") Eugenio Cuenco Sr. was also found at the scene. He was arrested immediately after being treated of his self-inflicted wounds and released from the hospital.

Following her death, Cuenco Sr. was charged with second-degree murder and was tried on court more than a year later. The jury found him “not criminally responsible” citing section 16 of the Criminal Code. The tragic assault exposed his undiagnosed clinical depression. He was given conditional discharge, permitting him to avoid jail term and allowing him to live in a supervised group home.

== Honours ==
Cuenco was an active in the Filipino-Canadian community and has been recognized for her contributions to both Canada and in the Philippines. In 1991, Juliet Cuenco was the recipient of the LINKAPIL or Lingkod sa Kapwa Pilipino (Service to Fellow Filipinos) presidential award from former Philippines president Corazon Aquino. LINKAPIL Award is conferred on overseas Filipinos for their exceptional or significant contribution to reconstruction, progress and development in the Philippines. She was also profiled in the Directory of Canadian Women specializing in global issues and was officially given honours at the book launching at the House of Commons.

Local advocacy groups working to end violence against women held vigils in her memory. Some activists believed Juliet Cuenco's name should be enshrined in the Ottawa Women's Monument on Elgin Street. However, family and few friends at the time said she was not an abused woman and posed questions whether the manner of her death merits her inclusion in the memorial site.

== Selected publications ==
- Mental health needs of immigrant women with Alma Estable, "Partneships in Health," conference proceedings of the Multicultural Health Coalition
- Domestic Workers in Canada: The Struggle, the Recognition in "The Womanist" 2,1 (1989): 40.
