= Anti-monument =

Anti-monument may refer to:

- Anti-monumentalism, an artistic theme
- Anti-monuments in Mexico, a form of protest art in public spaces
- Antimonument (album), the Merzbow album
