= Pritika Chowdhry =

Indian-born American artist, curator, and writer

- Born: Pritika Chowdhry; India
- Education: University of Wisconsin–Madison
- Notable work: Partition Anti-Memorial Project and Counter-Memory Project
- Website: pritikachowdhry.com

Pritika Chowdhry is an Indian-born American artist, curator, and writer. She is known for her work in the socio-political domain.

Pritika is the founder of Partition Anti-Memorial Project and Counter-Memory Project.

== Biography ==
Born in India, Pritika grew up in New Delhi. In 1999, she moved to the United States.

Pritika attended the University of Wisconsin–Madison and graduated with a Bachelor of Science in Art. She continued her study at the University of Wisconsin–Madison and earned a Master of Fine Arts (MFA) in Studio arts and a Master of Arts (MA) in Visual Culture and Gender studies.

Between 2009 and 2011, she was a visiting professor and taught at Macalester College and College of Visual Arts.

In 2007, she founded the Partition Anti-Memorial Project. The project consists of nine sub-projects focusing on historical events, including the 1947 Partition of India, 1971 Bangladesh War of Independence, and the 1919 Jallianwala Bagh Massacre. Her work has been exhibited at notable museums and arts galleries such as Queens Museum, Weisman Art Museum, Hunterdon Art Museum, Minnesota Museum of American Art, Sanskriti Museum & Art Gallery, and Islip Art Museum.

Pritika is the current senior curator at the South Asia Institute and is a member of the board of the Woman Made Gallery, Chicago.

== Awards and recognition ==
- 2007: David and Edith Sinaiko Frank Graduate Fellowship
- 2011: Performing and creative arts fellowship by American Institute of Indian Studies Fellowship

== Selected exhibitions ==
- Local Time, Weisman Art Museum, 2015
- Empty Time, Minnesota Museum of American Art, 2014
- Remembering the Crooked Line, Rohtas 2 Art Gallery, 2012
- Story Time, Islip Art Museum, 2010
- Retellings, Seven Art Gallery, 2010
- Erasing Borders, Queens Museum of Art, 2009
- The Master's Tongues, Woman Made Gallery, 2009

== Permanent collections ==
- American Swedish Institute
- Ukrainian Institute of Modern Art
- Weisman Art Museum

== Bibliography ==
- Chowdhry, Pritika (2007). Visceral Mappings: Transdiasporic Art Practices
