= Murder of Patricia Allen =

Murdered Canadian lawyer (1948–1991)

- Location: Ontario, Canada
- Date: November 13, 1991; Morning (EST)
- Target: Patricia Allen
- Attack type: Spousal homicide, domestic violence
- Weapon: Crossbow
- Deaths: 1
- Victim: Patricia Allen
- Perpetrator: Colin McGregor
- No. of participants: 1
- Motive: Estrangement, perceived rejection
- Verdict: Guilty
- Convictions: First degree murder
- Convicted: Yes
- Judge: Louise Charron

On November 13, 1991, Patricia Allen, a 31-year-old lawyer, was murdered by her estranged husband, Colin McGregor, with a crossbow in downtown Ottawa, Ontario, Canada. McGregor was found guilty of first degree murder and sentenced to life in prison.

The murder received national media coverage as Canada's first recorded instance of spousal homicide committed with a crossbow. The crossbow was utilized to circumvent firearm regulations.

== Background ==
=== Patricia Allen ===
Patricia Allen, the only daughter of George and Maisie Allen, grew up with two brothers. Allen earned her bachelor's degree in philosophy at university in Ottawa. Allen attended the McGill University Faculty of Law, where she graduated at the top her class in 1988 and won the prize for the highest achievement in civil law. In 1989 she moved to Ottawa with McGregor, where she worked as a lawyer for Revenue Canada.

=== Colin McGregor ===
Colin McGregor was the eldest of three sons of a Montreal business man who owned a travel agency. McGregor grew up in Westmount in Montreal. He attended Westmount High School then Marianopolis College he was valedictorian and student union president. McGregor competed as a debater at McGill University.

=== Allen's relationship with McGregor ===
The pair met at McGill University while Allen was studying law and McGregor was studying philosophy. After graduation they married and moved to Ottawa. Their relationship was described as rocky by family and friends, as they frequently fought and McGregor was perceived as jealous and possessive. By 1990, they bought a home and Allen was working as a lawyer with Revenue Canada.

During this period, McGregor frequently changed jobs. He worked as a reporter in Halifax and Montreal, as a media spokesperson for the Canadian Pharmaceutical Association and within the federal government. In the fall of 1990, McGregor started a Master of Public Administration at Carleton University while Allen supported him financially. In the summer of 1991 he was able to secure a co-op position as an auditor at the Department of National Defence.

Later in 1990, when Allen was promoted to senior policy adviser on the Goods and Services Tax, McGregor felt a shift in their relationship. At that time McGregor started acting bizarrely, complaining about pains in his throat, liver, eyes, pancreas and brain. He was convinced he was dying from a herpes infection, believing that swallowing a cold sore had triggered the dormant virus to spread throughout his body. After visiting a number of specialists no physical ailment was discovered. The doctors suggested his complaints were psychological. During this time, the neighbours heard the couple constantly arguing, often loudly.

McGregor was admitted to a psychiatric ward for one week in the spring of 1991. Following his release, his mental condition deteriorated, and he ceased working at National Defence. After threatening suicide in August 1991, McGregor was readmitted to the psychiatric ward for three weeks. It was determined that his physical symptoms were the result of stress, and he was quite probably using them to control and manipulate others. Doctors noted McGregor was very angry, full of resentment and hostility towards people. During his stay in the psychiatric ward, Allen told McGregor that she wanted a divorce.

Before the second week of September 1991, McGregor was discharged from the psychiatric ward and a close friend picked him up, with whom he lived for a short period. He would frequently call friends and ramble on topics such as suicide, his recent separation, his ailments and how his situation was unfair. After his release and up until her murder, McGregor harassed Allen incessantly. He called her repeatedly and tried to enter their former matrimonial home without her permission. During this time Allen kept a "diary of threats" and had a friend stay with her.

Leading up to the murder they met several times to divide their possessions as the divorce neared completion. In October 1991, McGregor managed to enter the house through a bathroom window using a pair of garden shears. On October 23, 1991, McGregor bought a crossbow and a pack of steel-tipped hunting bolts. In the following weeks he would use the walls of his room as a target practice, filling them with holes and continuing until the bolts were dull. A few days prior to the murder he bought a new set of bolts.

== Murder ==
On the morning of November 13, 1991, Allen drove to a dentist appointment on Argyle Avenue in downtown Ottawa. McGregor had been monitoring her movements and covertly followed her to the dentist's office. After Allen finished and was leaving McGregor got out of his vehicle and approached Allen while she was unlocking her vehicle, with a crossbow concealed by a garbage bag. Surprised, she asked him why he was there, at which point McGregor shot her in the chest with a steel-tipped hunting bolt, killing her.

McGregor went to a police station shortly after the attack and confessed to killing his wife. During questioning, which began approximately 45 minutes after the incident, he admitted that he had intentionally killed her. In his police interview, McGregor expressed extreme distress, stating that he felt suicidal and describing himself as “a monster.” He said he wanted to die and had previously considered killing both his wife and himself. He also disclosed that he believed he was terminally ill due to systemic herpes. McGregor further explained that he had purchased the crossbow with the original intention of using it to take his own life, noting that it was easier to obtain than a firearm.

After being charged with first degree murder and making an initial appearance in court, McGregor was sent to the Royal Ottawa Hospital for a 30-day psychiatric assessment. He later pleaded not guilty by reason of insanity. During McGregor's trial it was discovered that he informed his psychiatrist, weeks before Allen's murder, that he had wanted to kill her. In March 1993, Justice Louise Charron delivered her 149-page judgement rejecting McGregor's claim of insanity. He was sentenced to life in prison.

McGregor was released from prison after 29 years behind bars.

== Legacy and Consequences ==
=== Colin McGregor ===
McGregor was sentenced to life imprisonment and served 29 years. He was granted day parole to a halfway house in 2020 and full parole in 2022. While incarcerated, he learned French and became a bilingual writer. He contributed articles and maintained a blog for the online magazine The Social Eyes, co-authored two books with Raymond Viger (including the Quebec Suicide Prevention Handbook), and tutored other inmates. In one of his Social Eyes posts, he stated that prison had not made him bitter, citing his ability to help fellow prisoners, attend church services, and read extensively.

Regarding the murder of his wife, Patricia Allen, McGregor has written, “I will never live down what I did.” In a later French-language interview (translated), he said: “It took me years to become aware of this, but I decided not to blame others and to look at myself in the mirror … I reflected on the crime, I committed the crime, and I am guilty.” McGregor has not publicly apologized for the killing.

=== Remembering Patricia Allen ===
Patricia Allen's murder has a legacy that lives on today in several different ways and memorials.

In 1992 a scholarships fund was created at Carleton University in her honour called the Patricia Allen Memorial Fund. At first it started with private donations but later made use of other fundraising such as bingo nights and an annual golf tournament. By 1996 it had raised over $220,000 CAD to fund scholarships for graduate students who conduct research into spousal violence.

Also in 1992 the McGill University Faculty of Law Class of 88 created an annual guest lecture in her honour named the Patricia Allen Memorial Lecture, which consists of a yearly lecture (or two) "devoted to sensitizing and educating the legal community and others about pressing social and legal issues related to violence, especially against women."

In 1994, the Patricia Allen Memorial Fund supported a study with the Institute for Clinical Evaluative Sciences to explore when would it be necessary for doctors to report threats made by their patients. The results of the study assisted medical professionals to make several recommendations, such as compelling doctors to report their patient's serious threats concerning harming a person to the police or risk disciplinary action under professional misconduct regulations.

Patricia Allen's name is engraved on Enclave, a monument commemorating the lives of Ottawa women who were murdered by men from 1990 to 2000.
