= Minto Park =

Park in Ontario, Canada

Coordinates: 45.4167°N 75.6883°W

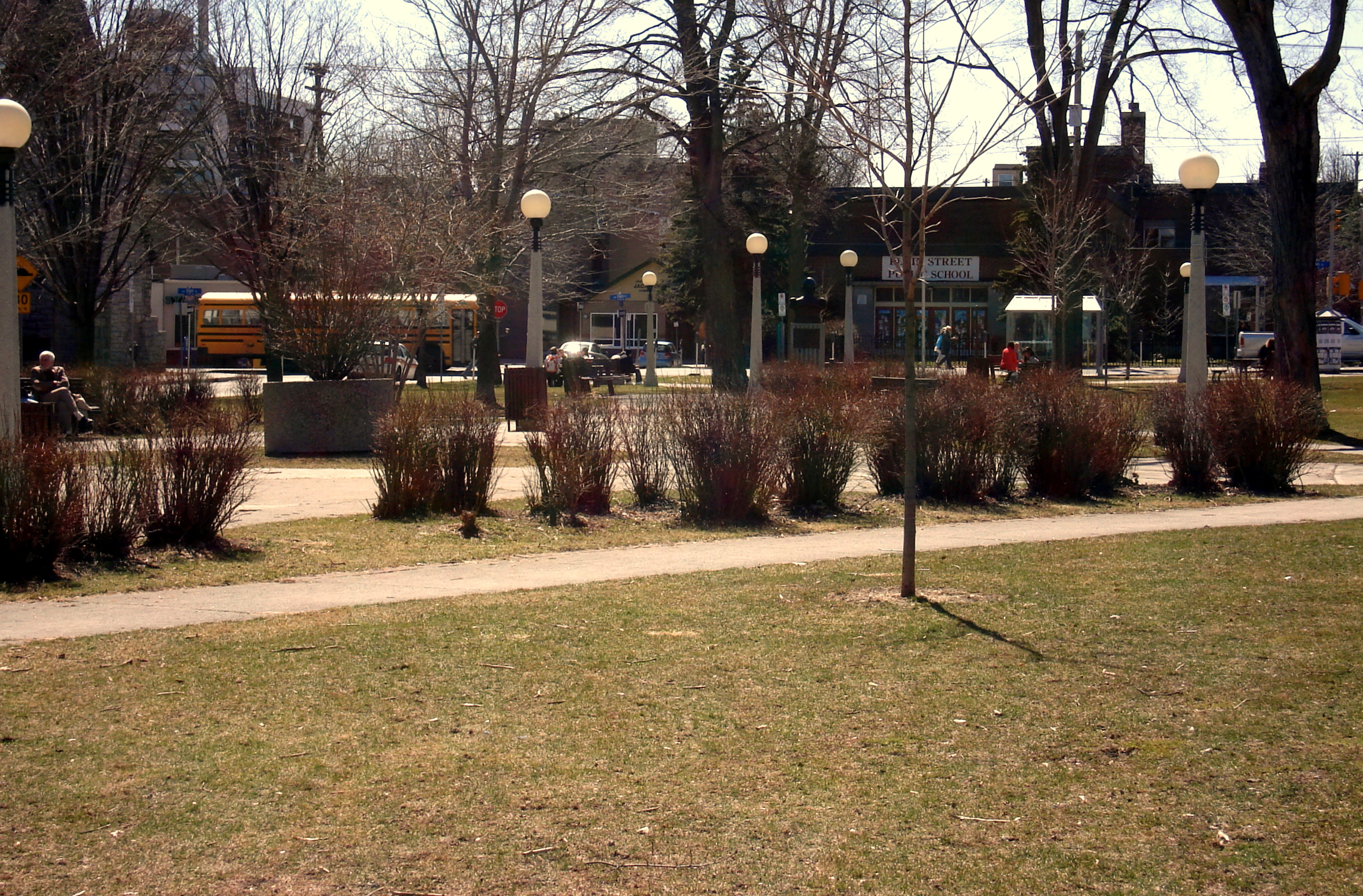
The west end of the park meeting Elgin Street

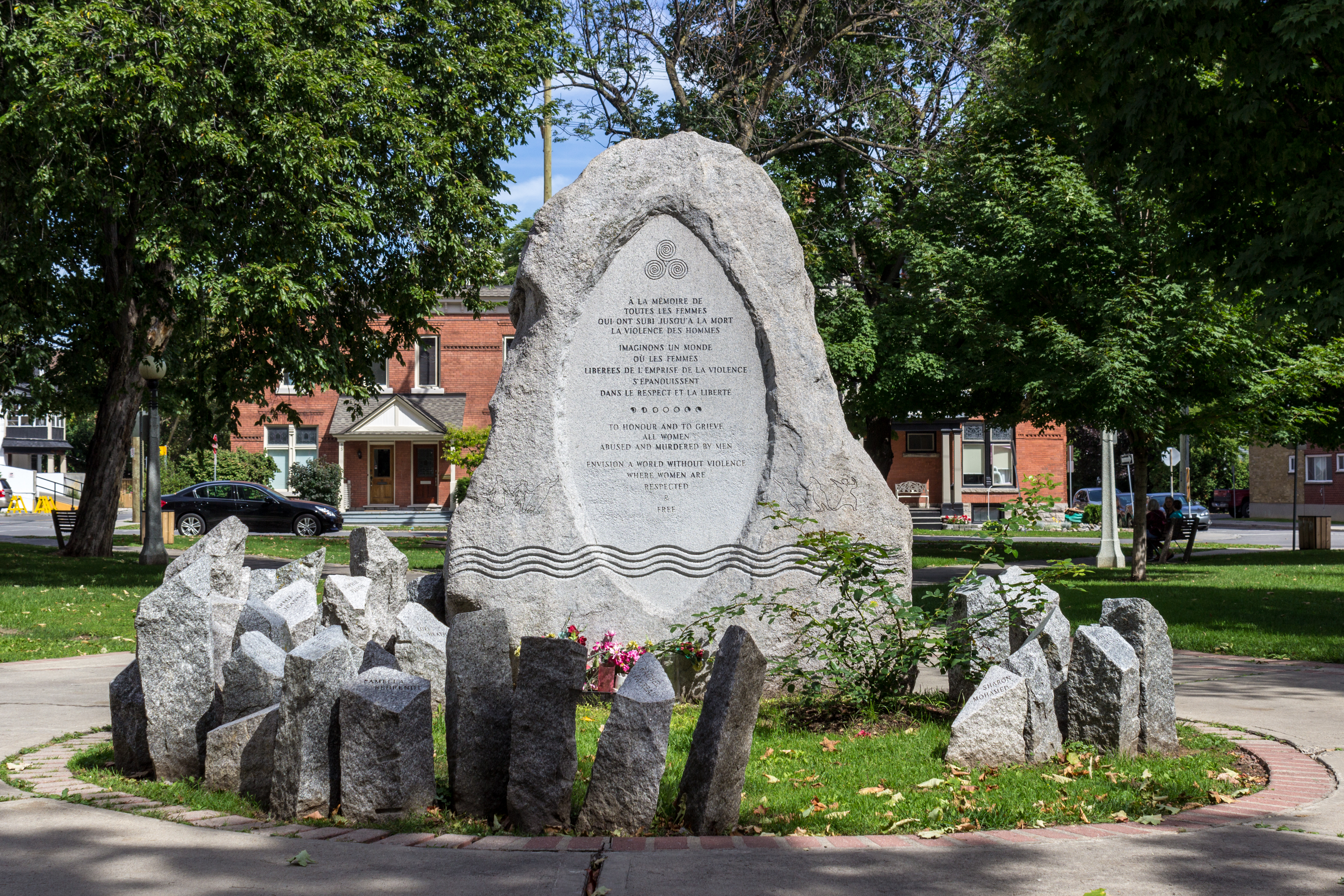
Memorial "To honour and to grieve all women abused and murdered by men" referring to the 1989 École Polytechnique massacre

Minto Park is a park in downtown Ottawa, Ontario, Canada. It occupies a full city block, meeting Elgin Street on the park's west side, Gilmour Street on the north, Cartier Street on the east, and Lewis Street on the south. It contains picnic benches, street lights and several monuments, including Enclave: The Ottawa Women's Monument (a memorial to women who were murdered and abused by men) and a bust of Argentinian general José de San Martín.

It was first purchased by the city corporation in 1899, for $7700, from J. R. Booth. It was named after the Earl of Minto, then Governor General.

Memorial events commemorating the anniversary of the École Polytechnique massacre have been held there, for example on December 6, 2022.

== See also ==
- List of Ottawa, Ontario parks
