= The Detectives (2018 TV series) =

Canadian television docudrama series

- Genre: True crime
- Country of origin: Canada
- Original language: English
- No. of seasons: 3
- No. of episodes: 24

Production
- Executive producer: Petro Duszara; Scott Bailey; Jennifer Gatien; Hans Rosenstein; Debbie Travis
- Production company: WAM Media GRP

Original release
- Network: CBC Television
- Release: January 10, 2018 – February 27, 2020

The Detectives is a Canadian television docudrama series, which premiered on CBC Television on January 10, 2018. Covering true crime stories, the series blends interviews with real police detectives who investigated the crimes with scripted dramatic reenactments.

The series was a continuation of the earlier one-season Netflix series Real Detective.

== Episodes ==
=== Season 1 (2018) ===
| No. overall | No. in season | Title | Original release date |
|---|---|---|---|
| 1 | 1 | "The Wells Gray Gunman" | January 10, 2018 |
1982. How did six people disappear off the face of the earth? One of the largest mass murders in Canada is committed in Wells Gray Park, British Columbia, as three generations of a family are killed on a camping trip. For Detective Mike Eastham (played by John Pyper-Ferguson), it’s a mission that takes him across the country and back again as he harnesses the powers of TV, radio and print media to catch the gunman. See Wells Gray Provincial Park murders.
| 2 | 2 | "Project Hitchhiker" | January 17, 2018 |
1990. Detective Herb Curwain (played by Eric Johnson) is promoted to the Homicide Unit and with this comes the assignment of an unsolved case he knows well — the disappearance of a young woman in Pickering, Ontario. There’s evidence this may be connected to one man and a string of serial killings. When red tape gets in the way, Curwain understands that if they are going to catch the killer, different agencies and jurisdictions will need to work together. In the process, they change the way serial killers are investigated in Canada to this day.
| 3 | 3 | "Trick or Treat" | January 24, 2018 |
2008. When a man goes missing after meeting someone from an online dating site, homicide investigator Bill Clark (played by Lochlyn Munro) finds himself in one of the largest cases in Edmonton, Alberta history. Clark goes deep into the world of internet homicide and faces the sickening potential that the murder was filmed and for sale to the highest bidder.
| 4 | 4 | "Father's Day" | January 31, 2018 |
2000. A three-year-old boy is found wandering the streets in Hamilton, Ontario. Two dead bodies are discovered inside an apartment. Detective Don Forgan (played by Aidan Devine) forms a close bond with the young witness of a horrific double murder. “I'm gonna try and catch the bad man,” he promises. Looking back on the most disturbing case of his career, he says, "it nearly broke me.”
| 5 | 5 | "Stranger Calling" | February 7, 2018 |
1982. Detective Rod Piukkala (played by Hugh Dillon) faces a gruesome crime scene in Mississauga, Ontario, a bomb threat, and a killer threatening to strike again. The victim’s family helps change Canadian parole laws forever.
| 6 | 6 | "Burning Season" | February 14, 2018 |
2011. A massive fire destroyed a 19th century heritage building and threatened Toronto's downtown core. The high-profile case still haunts Detective Debbie Harris (played by Amy Price-Francis). “This is someone who had gone leaps and bounds beyond that typical arsonist. There was an evil side of him.”
| 7 | 7 | "She Said" | February 14, 2018 |
2010. "Some people don't see a sex trade worker as a human being." When Nadine Taylor goes missing after an attack in Halifax, Nova Scotia, Nova Scotia, Sergeant Penny Hart (played by Jewel Staite) works to build trust between police and sex trade workers to solve the case.
| 8 | 8 | "Home" | February 14, 2018 |
2011. Within a month of arriving in Calgary, Alberta from the Philippines, Joel Zalsos was murdered in his home. Detective Thomas Barrow (played by Paul Popowich) prides himself on his ability to read suspects but is haunted when his instincts fail him.

=== Season 2 (2018) ===
| No. overall | No. in season | Title | Original release date |
|---|---|---|---|
| 9 | 1 | "The Walk Home" | September 20, 2018 |
2005. Like most nights, 18-year-old Jennifer Teague walked home from her late shift at work in Barrhaven. But this time, she never made it home. As the missing persons case turns into a homicide, Detective Greg Brown (played by Currie Graham) chases down one lead after another until he’s left with nothing but the knowledge that the killer is a local. Brown’s only hope is to put pressure on the town until the killer emerges. But will it work?
| 10 | 2 | "The Second Chance" | September 27, 2018 |
1995. When Louise Ellis fails to return home in Ottawa after going to visit her ex-boyfriend, her husband, Brett Morgan goes to great lengths to try and find her. Her car is abandoned on the side of the road with all her belongings still inside, but she’s nowhere to be found. Is she alive or dead? Did she run away? Was she kidnapped? Was she murdered? With no body, no signs of foul play, and no evidence left behind, Detective Bob Pulfer (played by David James Elliott) makes an unorthodox decision to have a civilian go undercover to figure out what happened to Louise.
| 11 | 3 | "Nine Shots" | October 4, 2018 |
1991. The small town of Chatham, Ontario is stunned by a vicious multiple murder. Two generations of a family are brutally killed. Detective Peter Baker (played by Gil Bellows) struggles to find a motive for the senseless slaying until a trail of missing guns leads to a shocking discovery. What terrible secrets are being hidden in Chatham, and why did they cost the lives of an elderly couple and their grandson?
| 12 | 4 | "Jackie" | October 11, 2018 |
1995. When Detective Mike Richard’s nephew was the prime witness to the abduction of an 8-year-old girl, he was immediately thrown into the middle of Fredericton’s worst crime in decades. With nothing to go on but a child’s description of a burly, bearded man, Richard (played by Kenneth Mitchell) took a big risk and sacrificed protocol to find a suspect before it was too late for Jackie. "I felt it was more important to try to find her than it was to follow some sort of judicial procedure." The DNA warrant legislation of June 1995 changed during the middle of the Jackie Clark case. The DNA warrant used in this case was the first of its kind in Canada and has been used as a reference in following criminal investigations.
| 13 | 5 | "Small Town Murder" | October 18, 2018 |
1995. When Detective Ken Leppert (played by Adam Harrington) transferred to the quaint village of Killaloe, Ontario, Ontario, he expected things to be peaceful. He was barely settled in with the OPP before he found himself immersed in a highly inflammatory case. He was sought out by a local woman with a bizarre allegation: that the death of mild-mannered Scott Dell more than a year earlier had not been a suicide, as had been determined by Leppert's colleagues — it was murder. And she could prove that it was her own ex-girlfriend, Cherrylle Dell, who was behind it. With an unconventional murder weapon, a highly vulnerable key witness and eyes of the entire town following his every move, this complex investigation tested Leppert and his team’s ability to dig deep and leave no stone unturned in the search for answers.
| 14 | 6 | "The Last Fare" | October 25, 2018 |
1990. When 23-year-old cab driver Lucie Turmel was found brutally murdered, it shook the picturesque tourist town of Banff, Alberta. It had been over three decades since there was a murder in the small community, and RCMP detective Doug Morrison (portrayed by Michael Shanks) was called in to take the case. New developments in DNA technology should have been a boost for the investigation, but a town full of transient workers meant there were thousands of possible suspects and no solid leads. Solving the largest investigation in Banff’s history took the help of the entire town.
| 15 | 7 | "Hatred" | November 1, 2018 |
A man is found stomped to death in a parking lot. The crime scene leads detectives to discover a Neo-Nazi community in a quiet Calgary, Alberta neighbourhood. Detective Dave Sweet (portrayed by Vincent Walsh) wonders who would be motivated to do something so vicious. "This case brought me face to face with something terrible," says the veteran Calgary detective.
| 16 | 8 | "Master Manipulator" | November 8, 2018 |
A man with no money and no trace of a criminal history is found beaten to death inside his home. His soon-to-be ex-wife has a score to settle with him but her alibi is rock-solid. Did she have him killed? Niagara's first female homicide investigator, Detective Keri Harrison (portrayed by Maxim Roy), follows her gut instinct to pursue a suspect even though evidence suggests they have no involvement.

=== Season 3 (2020) ===
| No. overall | No. in season | Title | Original release date |
|---|---|---|---|
| 17 | 1 | "Mother and Son" | January 9, 2020 |
An RCMP detective takes on the most personal case of his career when a mother and son are found strangled to death in their rural trailer home.
| 18 | 2 | "Out of Lies" | January 16, 2020 |
Lethbridge Police Detective Ryan Stef pushes his investigative creativity to the limit as he tries to solve the vicious murder of an innocent grandmother.
| 19 | 3 | "Starting Over" | January 23, 2020 |
A Hamilton detective follows a string of intriguing evidence, hoping it will unravel the mystery of why an innocent father of four was executed.
| 20 | 4 | "Project Houston" | January 30, 2020 |
A detective's investigation into a missing man from Toronto's Gay village uncovers a bizarre international cannibal ring, but that's just the beginning...
| 21 | 5 | "Project Prism" | February 6, 2020 |
As more men go missing from the Village, the entire city is on high alert. All eyes are on Toronto Detective Hank Idsinga to bring the disappearances to an end.
| 22 | 6 | "Officer Down" | TBA |
When a young RCMP constable is found murdered in the middle of a deserted road, it's up to Detective Earl Peters to figure out who killed his colleague in cold blood.
| 23 | 7 | "The Cottage Killer" | TBA |
The investigation into the deaths of a Toronto couple leads a detective to uncover a pattern of escalating crimes that suggest a serial killer is operating in cottage country.
| 24 | 8 | "Murder on the Causeway" | February 27, 2020 |
When a missing Punjabi mother is found murdered, Delta Police Detective Harj Sidhu must take a hard look into members of his own community to find answers.
