= Murder of Louise Ellis =

Murdered Canadian journalist (1948–1995)

Louise Ellis
- Born: June 23, 1948; Ottawa, Ontario, Canada
- Died: April 22, 1995 (aged 46); Ottawa, Ontario, Canada
- Cause of death: Strangulation
- Body discovered: July 6, 1995

Louise Ellis was a 46-year-old freelance journalist who was last seen alive near her home in Ottawa, Ontario, Canada on April 22, 1995. Suspicion fell on Brett Morgan, her common law partner, whom she had met while he was imprisoned on manslaughter charges. Ellis had advocated for his release, but afterwards reported he behaved violently and stole from her. A month after Ellis's disappearance, Morgan demanded access to her estate but was blocked by lack of confirmation of her death. With the help of a private investigator who suspected Morgan killed Ellis, and who was working with police, Morgan found Ellis's body on July 6, in Sainte-Cécile-de-Masham, Quebec, about 35 km (22 miles) from Ottawa. Morgan was subsequently convicted of killing Ellis and sentenced to life with no parole possibility for 25 years, and died in prison.

== Background ==
=== Louise Ellis ===
Louise Ellis was born on June 23, 1948, in Ottawa, Ontario. She worked as a writer, illustrator, freelance journalist and archivist, offering her services to Canada Post and Canadian Geographic.

=== Brett Morgan ===
Brett Morgan grew up in Edmonton, Alberta. Morgan was married twice, with both women fearing him due to his violent tendencies. His first wife, going by the name of Sandra at the preliminary inquiry of his murder trial, described how she married Morgan at the age of sixteen when she was seven months pregnant with his child. She believed that Morgan was 18 at the time, but he was only 15. Sandra revealed that she had been abused by Morgan, including a time when he suffocated her by pressing a pillow to her face. She suffered a miscarriage while pregnant with their second child after he repeatedly punched her in the stomach during a fight. Sandra decided to leave Morgan and made plans to fly to Inuvik, Northwest Territories to live with her grandmother. When Morgan became aware of her plans, he physically assaulted her and threatened her with a gun. Sandra and her son flew to Inuvik the following day.

In 1975, Brett Morgan met his second wife, going by the name of Christine, in Edmonton. They moved into a house together to save money and they became intimate shortly after. He and Christine got married after wanting to split his aunt's inheritance with her, stating he could not get the inheritance unless they got married. Christine decided to leave the relationship when her landlord informed her that Morgan had not been paying their rent. While driving together, Christine revealed to Morgan that she wanted to end the relationship. He pulled over the car and began choking her. Christine managed to jump out of the car and escape. Christine left shortly after to live with her mother in Florida. She later got an uncontested divorce.

On November 3, 1978, Morgan murdered 21-year-old prostitute Gwen Telford in a hotel room by strangling her to death. Morgan was convicted of manslaughter and was sentenced to 10 years in prison. By this time, Morgan had also accumulated charges of possession of stolen property, false pretenses, forgery, break and enter and theft.

=== Ellis's relationship with Morgan ===
In 1992, Louise began covering the wrongful conviction of David Milgaard, who was accused and convicted of the murder of Gail Miller. She met Morgan at the hearing of the case in 1993 as he was testifying against his former cellmate, Larry Fisher, who was the real perpetrator of the crime. After hearing Morgan testify, she was touched by his willingness to speak up against his cell mate and decided to tell him so before he left the courtroom. They started corresponding while Morgan was still incarcerated, and Ellis started visiting him in prison and he subsequently moved in with her after his release. Two months after living together, Ellis wrote in her diary about physical fights that she and Morgan got into. The abusive behaviour included Morgan pouring beer over her head, and punching a hole through a door. Morgan moved out to a basement suite in January 1995. After the upstairs unit was broken into that February, Morgan was asked to move out. He temporarily moved back in with Ellis, having plans to move out by May 1.

Ellis noticed that money was missing from her personal line of credit and her chequing account. A cheque of $7,000 was forged on Ellis's personal line of credit by Morgan in January 1995. Another $5,400 was forged by Morgan in February.

== Murder ==
On April 22, 1995, Ellis was planning on spending the night at an ex-boyfriend's home to celebrate his daughter's birthday. Police believe Ellis had confronted Brett Morgan and demanded him to pay her back, and a fight ensued. Morgan then suffocated Ellis in the bathroom of her home. Morgan wrapped Ellis's body in a shower curtain and used her car to drive to Sainte-Cécile-de-Masham, where her body was dumped in a wooded area. This location was close to the property of Ellis's ex-partner, John Maisonneuve, which Morgan purposefully chose in an attempt to frame him for murder. Morgan then drove Ellis's car near Wakefield, where he abandoned it before biking back to Ottawa.

The next day, Morgan said he received a call from the ex-boyfriend saying that she had never made it to the house.

Ellis's car was found on April 24, abandoned on the side of the road with her purse and overnight bag locked inside. The car was in good mechanical shape and had plenty of gasoline still in the tank. Morgan spoke to the media pleading for the return of his spouse. He had also organized search parties, which failed to come up with any new leads. Approximately a month after Ellis disappeared without a trace, Morgan requested access to her estate.

== Investigation ==
Marie Parent was studying to be a private detective and decided to take a look at Louise Ellis's missing person case for her final assignment. After seeing Morgan speak on television, Parent decided to offer her private investigator services in the search for his girlfriend. After several conversations, Parent noticed inconsistencies in Morgan's story and started to suspect he was involved in Ellis's disappearance. This is when Parent decided to work with Ottawa police.

On June 24, Parent and Morgan started searching for Ellis's remains in the Gatineau Hills. They began their search near Maisonneuve's home. They spent hours traveling along dirt roads and walking through forests. Parent described the search as "more of a nature walk", as they never went deep into the woods to search for Ellis. On July 5, 1995, the police instructed Parent to get Morgan out of the house so they could plant a covert listening device in his truck. Parent went to a restaurant with Morgan, where he started to make advances towards her. After arriving at Morgan's home, they agreed to meet the following day to continue their search for Ellis. Morgan and Parent found Ellis's remains on July 6. After walking through a dense patch of forest, Parent thought she spotted something approximately 30 feet away. She noted her observations to Morgan about what she spotted, and he stated that he believed it was Louise. Parent questioned Morgan, and he said that he had spotted her running shoe about 40 feet away. When they came upon the scene, they discovered Ellis's decomposed body. The police arrested Morgan later that day.

== Aftermath ==
The trial started in the fall of 1997 and lasted six months with more than 90 witnesses testifying. In March 1998, Brett Morgan was convicted of the first-degree murder of Louise Ellis and was sentenced to life in prison with no possibility for parole for 25 years. He died in prison due to hepatitis C two months into his sentence.

Police said that Morgan was a suspect of two unsolved murders in Alberta in the 1970s.

Ellis's name is featured on Enclave, a monument commemorating the lives of Ottawa women who were murdered by men from 1990 to 2000.

== In media ==
Louise Ellis's case was featured in several television shows. It was the pilot episode on Murder She Solved: True Crime aired September 11, 2010, then it was later that year featured on season one of Hardcover Mysteries, episode seven: "Kathy Reichs" on November 22, 2010. On September 27, 2018, her story was shown on season two of The Detectives, episode two: "the Second Chance". Then again on September 7, 2019, her story was featured on season two of The Case That Haunts Me, episode four, called "Second Chance".

Ellis's story is also the inspiration of two loosely based novels about her story but both are entirely fictional. D'Amour Road was written by Sigrid Macdonald, who was an acquaintance of Ellis's through the David Milgaard Support group. Macdonald stated that her book is not the story of Ellis, but she did have Ellis in mind while writing it.
