= Platz des Unsichtbaren Mahnmals =

Public square in Saarbrücken, Germany

Coordinates: 49.2305°N 6.9916°E

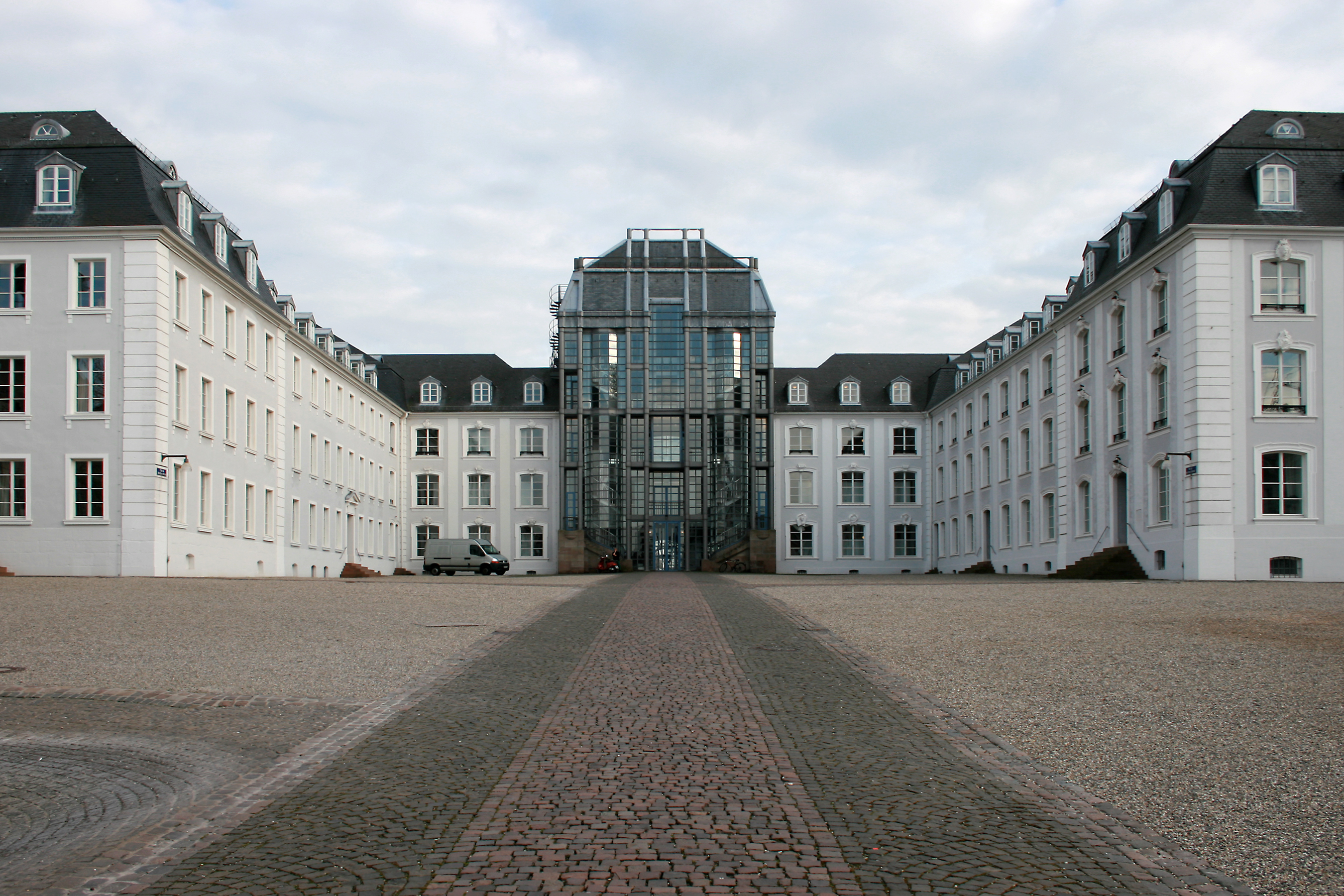
The invisible memorial in front of the castle

The Platz des Unsichtbaren Mahnmals – or in English, the Place of the Invisible Memorial (Note: The moment is sometimes also called 2146 Stones: Monument Against Racism) – is a memorial to Jewish cemeteries. It is located in Saarbrücken, capital of the German state of the Saarland. To the visitor, the memorial is completely invisible – it only appears as a sign at the place, reading "Platz des Unsichtbaren Mahnmals".

Beginning in April 1990, art professor Jochen Gerz and several of his students started, in secrecy, to dig up cobblestones from the place in front of the Saarbrücken castle. The underside of the stones were then engraved with the names of German Jewish cemeteries, and afterwards they were returned to the place, with the inscription facing downwards. They chose the forecourt of Saarbrücken Castle because a regional center of the Secret State Police, or Gestapo, was located in the castle during the time of national socialism.

In August 1991, the idea was taken up by the city council of Saarbrücken, and it decided to implement it legally. In the end, a total of 2146 location names of Jewish cemeteries, which had existed until their destruction by the Nazi regime in 1933, were engraved into the cobblestones, and again placed back into the forecourt of the castle. The memorial intends to portray the neglect of the German past.

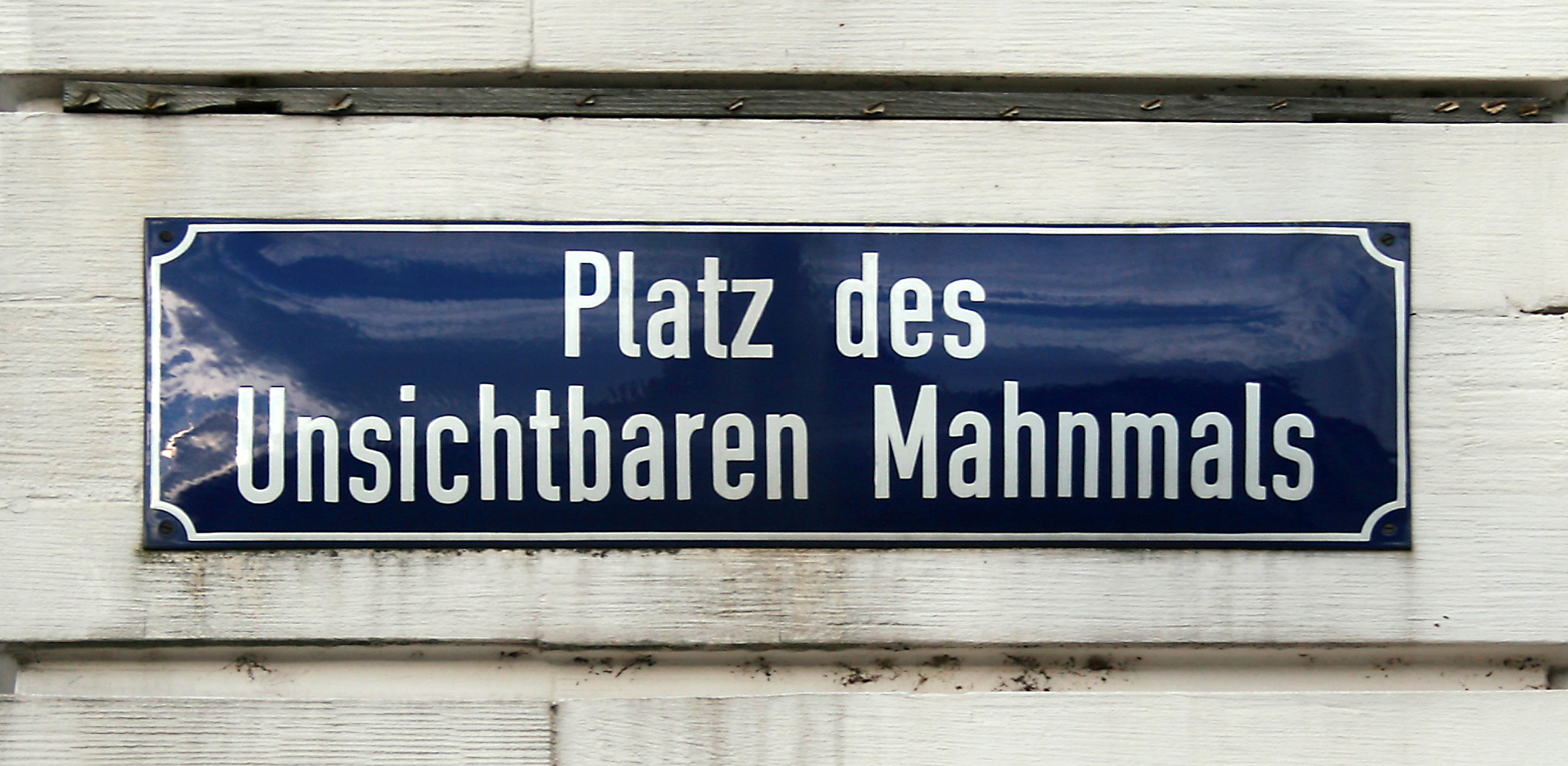
A plaque denoting the memorial was unveiled on May 23, 1993.

Gerz viewed the memorial as a way of undermining the "glorification" of an event that traditional monuments evoke, saying:

If you are representing absence you should create absence. That same absence also permits each person to become the author of his/her own memorial work.

== See also ==
- Anti-monumentalism
