= Anti-monumentalism =

Contemporary public monument movement

Anti-monumentalism (or counter-monumentalism) is a tendency in contemporary art that intentionally challenges every aspect (form, subject, meaning, etc.) of traditional public monuments. It has been defined as art designed "not to uphold but negate sacred values". Anti-monumentalism claims to deny the presence of any imposing, authoritative social force in public spaces.

It developed in Germany as an opposition to monumentalism whereby authorities (usually the state or dictator) establish monuments in public spaces to symbolize themselves or their ideology, and influence the historical narrative of the place. The Vietnam Veterans Memorial (1982), or Jochen Gerz's 2146 Stones (1993) can be considered examples of anti-monumentalism.

== History ==
The term counter-monumentalism first appeared through the compositions of, linguist and Jewish studies scholar, James E. Young in describing the works of German artists dealing with the memory of the Holocaust. According to Young, anti-monumentalism stems from “a deep distrust of monumental forms in light of their systematic exploitation by the Nazis, and a profound desire to distinguish their generation from that of the killers through memory.” Young considers these counter-monuments to go against the traditional principles of monuments, for example, by challenging "prominence and durability, figurative representation and the glorification of past deeds." Anti-monuments challenge "the power of traditional monuments to suggest completeness, or a false sense of closure" or ideals like beauty by purposefully creating alternate public experiences and forms. According to artist Rafael Lozano-Hemmer, anti-monumentalism also "refers to an action, a performance, which clearly rejects the notion of a monument developed from an elitist point of view as an emblem of power." Art historian Mechtild Widrich has discussed the performative aspects of contemporary monuments and also the limits of counter-monuments in many of her publications. On the current status of counter-monuments in the 21st century, Widrich writes: "In the last decades of the twentieth century, a revolution seemed to sweep art and architecture’s relation to the past. The term 'counter-monument,' seemed to fittingly describe a more democratic ethos of engaging individuals subjectively rather than authoritatively instilling moral lessons. The postmodern breakdown of historical master narratives encouraged such a changed notion of commemoration. From a twenty-first-century point of view, however, the memorial landscape looks more complex: personal interaction, while still at the center of commemoration, has been reassessed, and is not necessarily seen as the best or only tool to engage humans with their history. Indeed, new epochal concepts, like the Anthropocene, stress that humans live their lives in a world that both impacts and is impacted by their presence: this has resulted in a more inclusive, but also a more sober view of memorials as geographical and ideological landscapes."

== Characteristics ==
Young wrote that the counter-monument is “ethically certain of their duty to remember, but aesthetically skeptical of the assumptions underpinning traditional memorial forms.” As such, anti-monumental works possess their own characteristics that consciously differentiate them from traditional monuments:

=== Subject ===
Anti-monumental works usually address the more obscure and distressing parts of history and wrongful ideologies. Whereas traditional monuments tend to glorify these specific events, people and periods of history.

=== Form ===
The form presented by anti-monumentalism fundamentally opposes the traditional monument. This is notable in terms of their conception, utilisation, materials used, duration, size, etc. It is fitting for their form to be contradicting conventional monuments as they convey troubling issues. Often, an element of traditional monumentalism is present in order to demonstrate the stark contrast of the message coming from the anti-monument, such as the empty traditional monument pedestal by Do-Ho-Suh.

=== Inversion ===
In Counter-monuments: the anti-monumental and the dialogic the authors write:

"Possibly the most notable and most common feature of anti-monumentality is its opposition to conventional monumental form and the employment of alternative, contrasting design techniques, materials and duration. Fundamental inversions also include voids instead of solids, absence instead of presence (as with the Aschrott Fountain and Harburg’s disappearing Monument against Fascism), dark rather than light tones, and an emphasis on the horizontal rather than the vertical. Forms may be sunken rather than elevated (as in the Vietnam Veterans Memorial), shifted off-axis, or dispersed or fragmented rather than unified in a single, orderly composition at a single location..."

=== Site ===
Traditional monuments are portrayed in a glorified manner and are very apparent in the space they are in. Anti-monumentalism is discreet in nature, it is not obvious to the eye and is presented nonchalantly in everyday journeys along the area it is in. Some anti-monuments are entirely invisible to the eye, which in itself is part of the message that the anti-monument is attempting to convey.

=== Public experience ===
Anti-monumentalism questions, surprises and engages the visitor instead putting up distance, insisting on sobriety and respect from the spectator such as what conventional works do.

=== Meaning ===
The meaning of traditional works is usually instructive and coherent. In contrast, anti-monumentalism portrays abstract meanings and are generally unclear in their response. Their interpretation would be reliant on the visitors' common understandings and additional details provided by signs.

== Examples ==
The movement of anti-monumentalism has progressed into a movement of challenging difficult and controversial historical individuals or events. Examples include Krzysztof Wodiczko's Bunker Hill Monument Projections (1998), The Fourth Plinth Commissions – especially Marc Quinn’s Alison Lapper Pregnant (2005) and Mark Wallinger’s Ecce Homo (1999), John Latham's Five Sisters (1976), Braco Dimitrijević's Obelisk 11 March, Björn Lövin's Lenin Monument April 13th 1917 (1977), Kori Newkirk's Prime (2016), and Aria Dean's New Monument for Franska Tomten (2020). Other notable examples include:

=== 2146 Stones – Monument against Racism / The Invisible Monument by Jochen Gerz ===
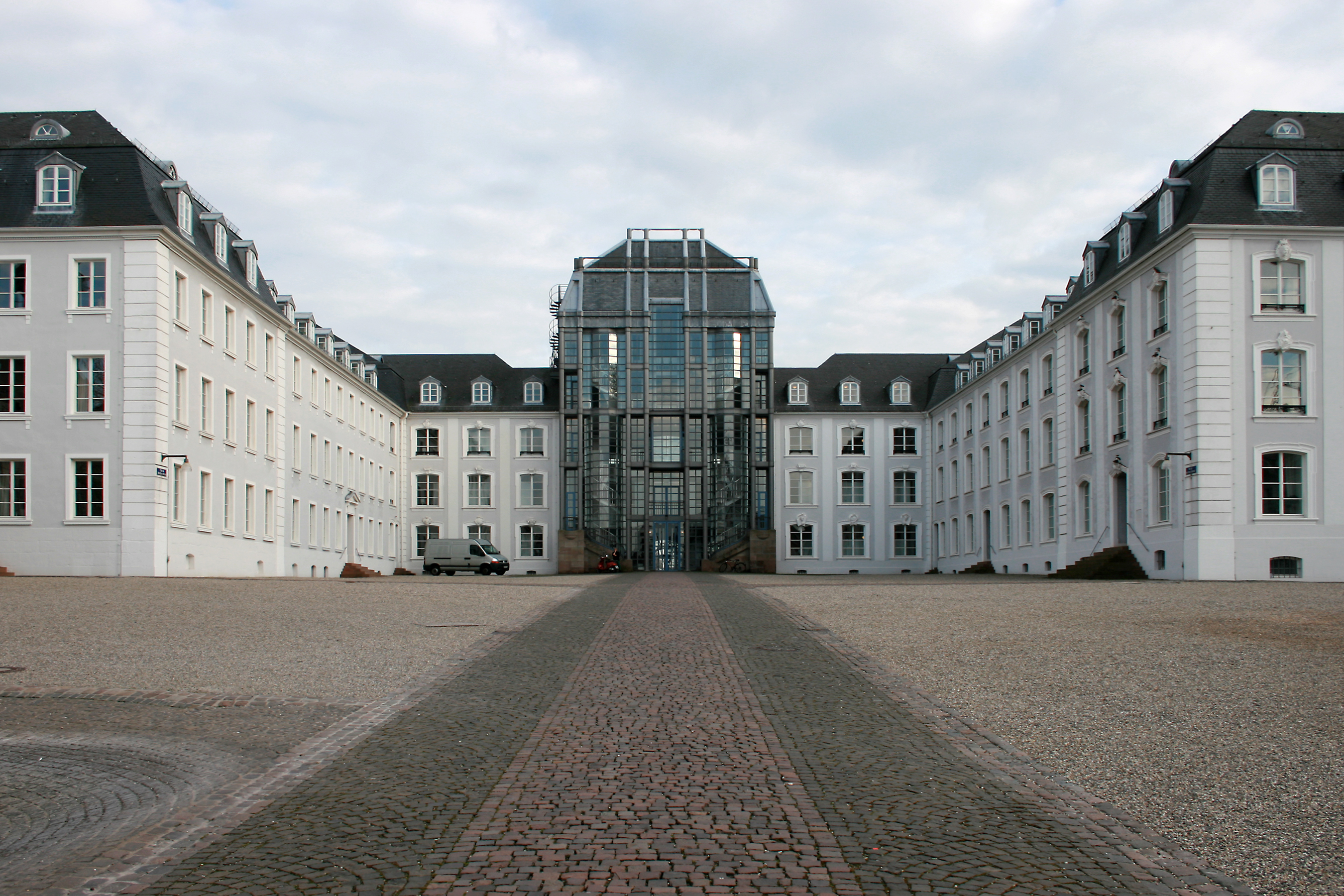
View of 2146 Stones. The cobblestones in the plaza bear the names of Jewish cemeteries underneath.

Jochen Gerz's work 2146 Stones (1993), is considered to be one of the first examples of anti-monumentalism. Referred to as the 'Invisible Monument', this anti-monument exists to highlight the crimes against Jewish people committed by the Nazis and is situated in the eponymous Platz des Unsichtbaren Mahnmals (English: Place of the Invisible Memorial) in Saarbrücken, Germany. It consists of around 8000 paving stones with the names of Jewish cemeteries engraved on the underside of the stones.

=== Public Figures by Do-Ho Suh ===
Do-Ho Suh's Public Figures (1998), brings attention to the purpose of monuments and statues. The artists has created a traditional monument, that is constructed with hundreds of miniature figures, both male and female, holding up an empty pedestal. Do-Ho Suh's traditional monument, is 'turned upside down' by drawing attention to the idea that the focus should not be on top of the pedestal, but instead to the masses below.

=== Shadow on the land, an excavation and bush burial by Nicholas Galanin ===
Nicholas Galanin's Shadow on the Land (2020) is an excavation in the form of the shadow cast by the monument of Captain Cook in Sydney, Australia. The purpose of this anti-monument was to highlight the dark side of Cook's colonial enterprises and shed light onto the indigenous inhabitants who suffered upon Cook's arrival. The excavation could be interpreted as either a past or future burial of the long-standing monument which still serves to praise the heroics of colonialism.

=== Vietnam Veterans Memorial by Maya Lin ===
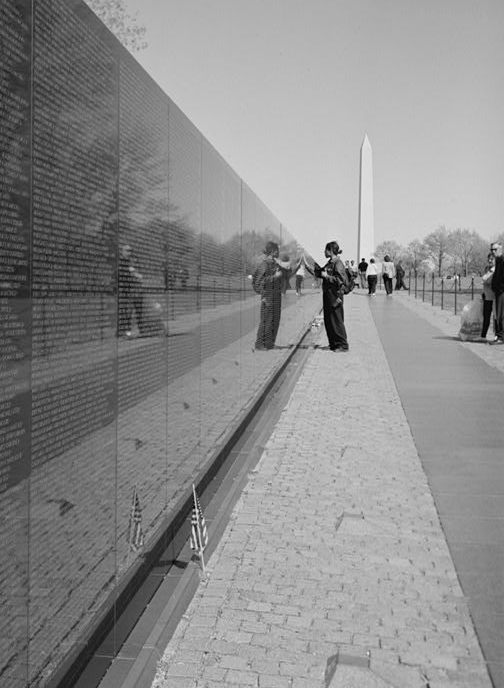
Vietnam War Memorial by Maya Lin, 1982, Washington D.C.

The Vietnam Veterans Memorial in Washington, D.C., was designed by Maya Lin and dedicated in 1982. Lin, an architect and graduate of Yale University, won the competition for the design at the age of 21. It consists of large chevron shaped, polished black granite walls descending into the landscape. It was a controversial design at the time of its dedication. Senator Jim Webb expressed shock: “I never in my wildest dreams imagined such a nihilistic slab of stone.” James Watt, secretary of the interior under President Ronald Reagan, initially refused to issue a building permit for the memorial due to the public outcry about the design.

The Vietnam Veterans Memorial, despite its official title, works as an anti-monument as it is essentially conceptual art in its minimalism. Catesby Leigh writes in her book Anti-Monument: The Vietnam Veterans Memorial and Its Legacy that it is a "hyper-reductionist strand of modernist art that takes abstraction to an extreme" It is also without ornament, nor explanation. It inverts monumentality in its sunken-ness. The non-representational form of the work allows for multiple interpretations, and that it is "dialogical" in nature as it contrasts to the prevalent forms of memorialization in D.C.

== South Asia ==
Pritika Chowdhry is an artist of South Asian descent who presents her work as anti-memorials depicting inhuman violence taken place specially in South Asian history at various points of time. Chowdhry presented latex casts of the Jallianwala Bagh memorial in Punjab, India; the Minar-e-Pakistan memorial in Lahore, Pakistan; and the Martyred Intellectuals memorial in Rayer Bazar, Dhaka, Bangladesh together as anti-memorial about violence and rape against women in the ethnic conflict during the Partition of India and the Bangladesh Liberation War. Similarly she created an anti-memorial depicting the Gujarat Pogrom riots in Gujarat state of India.

== Usage in Mexico and other Hispanic American countries ==
In Spanish-speaking world, especially Mexico, the parallel term antimonumento has developed a different meaning. It is the equivalent to political guerilla sculpture, or simply, an illegal installation of a politically themed sculpture. They are used to denounce the inaction of the state and reclaim public space. Normally an antimonumento is installed during a demonstration and, as Márcio Seligmann-Silva writes, "corresponds to a desire to actively recall the (painful) past." Some of the issues commemorated are disappearances, massacres, migration, and the killing of women.

== See also ==
- Anti-monuments in Mexico
- Enclave: The Ottawa Women's Monument
- Glorieta de las mujeres que luchan
- Mattress Performance (Carry That Weight)
