= Enclave: The Ottawa Women's Monument =

Public monument in Ottawa, Canada

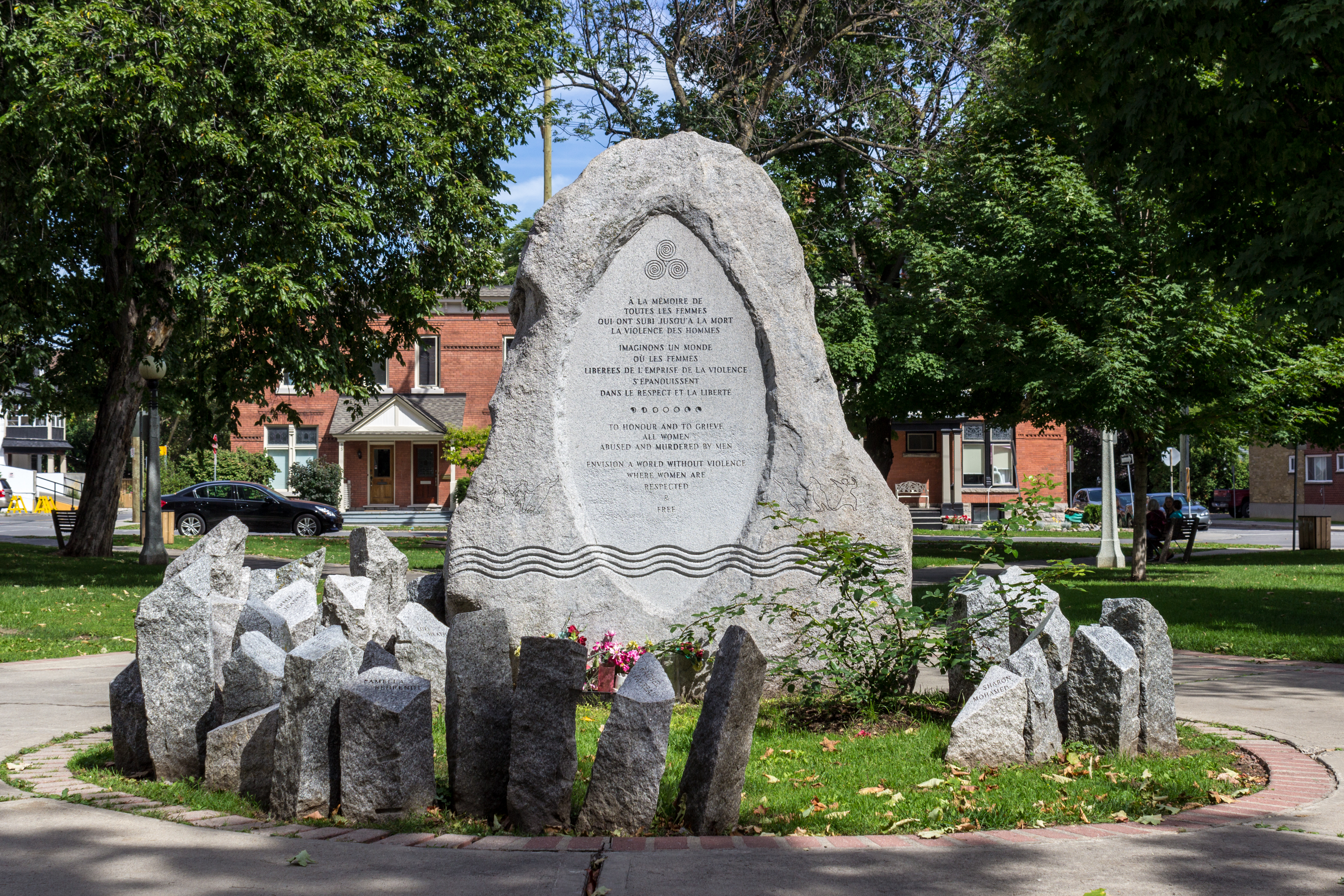
Enclave in 2014, Minto Park, Ottawa

Enclave: The Ottawa Women's Monument is a public monument that honours the lives of local women and girls murdered by men between 1990 and 2000. It is located in Minto Park, off of Elgin Street, in Ottawa, Ontario, Canada. It was built in 1992 by the Women's Urgent Action Committee in reaction to the Montreal Massacre of December 6, 1989, and a patriarchal climate of violence against women.

== History ==
Unveiled December 6, 1992, on the National Day of Remembrance and Action on Violence Against Women, Enclave was created by artist C. J. Fleury and landscape architect Mary Leigh Faught, led by the Committee.

Upon the brutal murder of Pamella Behrendt by her husband in 1990, the Women's Urgent Action Committee was created. They decided to use Minto Park as a spot for Behrendt's vigil in summer 1990.

They commissioned a monument to memorialize the victims of the École Polytechnique massacre in December 1989, and of other violence against women. It was unveiled on the anniversary of the massacre in 1992. The group continues to hold vigils for Ottawa women at the memorial. It also conducts annual gatherings on the December 6 anniversary. The Committee has planted trees at the park in memorial of murdered and abused women and girls.

The last engraving of a victim was made in 2000, when the name of Sandra Campbell was replaced with "Jane Doe" due to legal issues, causing controversy and contributing to the dissolution of the committee. Since then, no official changes have been made to the monument though many people wish to have more names added.

== Description ==
The central piece of the monument is a 2-metre-long (6.6 ft) uncut upright granite stone. On its rough surface is a smooth indented double-pointed oval, or yoni, containing engravings. The main engraving consists of the same text in English and French. In English it reads:

To honour and to grieve
all women
abused and murdered by men
envision a world without violence
where women are
respected
&
free.

Illustrations of a three-swirl symbol (or triskele), the phases of the moon, waves, and female figures also appear on the stone's face. Surrounding this central stone are 37 smaller stones, placed in an open spiral, each engraved with the name of a woman killed by an act of violence perpetrated by a man. The Ottawa Women's Monument is located in the middle of Minto Park, in line with the bust of Argentinian general José de San Martín, which is situated on the Elgin Street side of the park.

=== Symbolism ===
Enclave: The Ottawa Women's Monument is an instalment that incorporates feminine symbolic imagery. The boulder was chosen to call to mind the visual of hips without having to cut or modify in stone to make it look a particular way. This was important in its design so as to be easily identifiable as naturally female and not sculpted to fit certain ideas of femininity. The triskele spiral engraved at the top is a Neolithic symbol that signifies continuity and references ancient divine femininity. The round arrangement of the stones is meant to evoke a sense of cyclical life, death and rebirth, openness, and to encourage people to enter the walls of the enclave and engage with the memories of the women mourned there. The shape of the boulder and the polished pointed oval also reflects yonic imagery. Additionally, the memorial's geographical location between Ottawa's courthouse and the police station can act to remind visitors of the systemic issues at play in violence against women and the lack of attention given to addressing them.

== Women honoured ==
The women and girls memorialized are:

- Patricia Allen, 31, was murdered in November 1991 by her husband while they were in the process of a divorce. Shot with crossbow in a downtown Ottawa street.
- Carole Poulin Begley, 51, was murdered in March 1996. Stabbed 14 times by husband. Police were often called by neighbours but no action was taken.
- Pamella Behrendt, 55, was murdered in June 1990 by her husband with a chainsaw then killing himself. She had wanted a divorce. Mother of three.
- Sylvie Boucher, 38, was murdered in November 1996 by her husband. Double-murder suicide with her 12-year-old son. She had left her husband a week before her murder.
- Reva Bowers, 30, was murdered in April 1991. Shot by estranged husband outside her home. He then shot himself in front of a group of schoolchildren. Bowers had a restraining order against him that her husband had already been jailed for violating.
- Esther Carlisle, 80, was murdered in 1997. She was discovered with her head partly severed by a number of stab wounds. Police theorized that she was the victim of murder-suicide by her neighbour and close friend, a 57-year-old man who was found deceased in the Ottawa River the same day.
- Juliet Cuenco, stone removed. Choked and beaten to death in April 1993 by husband.
- Micheline Cuerrier, 26, was murdered in 1998. Throat slashed by boyfriend and left on the side of the road.
- Kelli Davis, 33, was strangled to death in 1996 by her husband.
- Victoria Debes, 58, murdered 1998. Stabbed and struck with a rolling pin by her husband who also stabbed their son. The husband showed no remorse for his actions, when police informed him that his wife was dead he stated "I don't care".
- Melanie Desroches, 13, murdered in summer 1993. Beaten to death with a wrench, she was hit 68 times by a 14-year-old from her school. He lured her into the woods while waiting for the two children she was babysitting were taking their swim lessons.
- Jane Doe, previously the marker for Sandra Campbell.
- Louise Ellis, 46, was murdered by her partner in 1995. Was missing for three months before her remains were found.
- Rachel Favreau, 21, shot by her common-law husband. Mother of an infant.
- Sophie Filion, 23, was found in garbage bags in a parking lot in Westboro in December 1993. Died of strangulation. She was the mother of two young children. No arrest was made but police have stated that they have narrowed it down to a single suspect.
- Thelma Fokuhl, 66, was beaten to death by her common-law partner in December 1992. The coroner stated it was the worst beating he had ever seen in his profession.
- Lori Goodfellow, was murdered in September 1992 by her husband who also killed his second wife.
- Sherri Lee Guy, 20, murdered in April 1995, shot by her ex-common-law partner after she had left him with her baby two weeks before her murder. The day of her murder she had called the police three times to report feeling threaten.
- Lori Heath, 34, was murdered in September 1993, throat cut by her partner whom she was separating from. Mother of two teenage daughters.
- Bernita Herron, 36, body found in a duffel bag in a parking garage. No arrest was made.
- Fengzhi Huang, 36, was killed in 2000.
- Karena Janveau, 24, was murdered by her boyfriend in 1999. Perpetrator attempted to conceal the body in garbage bags in the basement.
- Carmen Jeannot, 43, was murdered in 1995. Shot by husband alongside their 12-year-old daughter.
- Barbara Lanthier, 46, was murdered in 1994 by her husband. She drowned her common-law husband's truck after he drove it in Mississippi River.
- Anne Laurin, 37, was murdered in 1997 by gunshot.
- Marie Fernande Levesque, 70, was murdered in 1994 by her husband in a murder-suicide.
- Carrie Mancuso, 32, was murdered in September 1995. Strangled to death with her own cross necklace. No arrest was made, it is still an unsolved case.
- Sharon Mohamed, 14, was murdered in June 1991 by her mother's boyfriend who threw boiling water on and stabbed her and her mother as her mother refused to lend him money. Her mother survived the attack.
- Mary Ann Paquette, 39, was murdered on December 25, 1995. Strangled by husband. She had been planning on leaving her husband.
- Lillian Pilon, 42, was murdered in July 1990. Stabbed to death by husband. Mother to one.
- Tammy Proulx, 34, was murdered in 1997 by a man she had a tremulous relationship with. She was a mother to two children.
- Vanessa Ritchie, 24, triple-murder suicide of Vanessa and her two children by her husband in 1995.
- Melinda Sheppitt, 16, was murdered while pregnant in September 1990. She was being exploited as a sex-worker.
- Joan St. Jean, 53, was murdered in April 1998 in a suspected murder-suicide. She had a son.
- Barbara Teske, 38, was murdered by her husband in 1998. He struck her and left her to bleed out on their basement floor. He attempted to cover up the murder by burning her body in their backyard.
- Charmaine Thompson, 23, was murdered by her boyfriend while pregnant. She was visiting Ottawa from Jamaica.
- Angela Tong, 22, was murdered winter of 1997. Lured under false pretenses, she was stabbed to death by an acquaintance that was obsessed with her, put in a hockey bag and left in the snow.
- Cornelia Wyss, 24, murdered in 1998, strangled by her husband in Switzerland after she planned to return to Canada with her two sons.

== Controversy ==
In 2000, legal issues surrounding the accusation of one of the women's alleged murderers took place. This resulted in the Committee being required to remove the name of Sandra Campbell because her husband's murder charges were stayed. Instead of removing the stone, they replaced her name with "Jane Doe" to reflect the countless women who have disappeared, and the people responsible who have not been brought to justice by the legal system.

Another controversy surrounding the monument is the claim that it is sexist in its targeting of men as perpetrators. Some feminists and members of the Committee were also concerned with its specifying men as agents of violence against women because they thought it could direct attention away from the victims.

The essentialized female imagery is also a subject of debate as it is seen by some as exclusionary in its portrayal of a particular kind of womanhood and its erasure of the specific struggles with gendered violence faced by indigenous women and girls.

== See also ==
- Anti-monumentalism
