= The Philippine Reporter =

Canadian online and print newspaper

The Philippine Reporter is an online and paper print media outlet based in Toronto, Ontario, Canada that has been publishing since March 1989. It carries Philippine news and community news and feature stories about Filipinos in Philippines, Canada, and the U.S. The Philippine Reporter is widely read in the Greater Toronto Area and is usually distributed in Filipino Canadian stores.

== Awards ==
- 2003 “Best Editorial and Design Award” by National Ethnic Press and Media of Council Canada
- 2009 “Best Editorial and Visual Presentation” award from National Ethnic Press and Media Council of Canada through Prime Minister Stephen Harper on Nov. 21, 2009

== See also ==
- List of newspapers in Canada
