= Björn Lövin =

Swedish artist

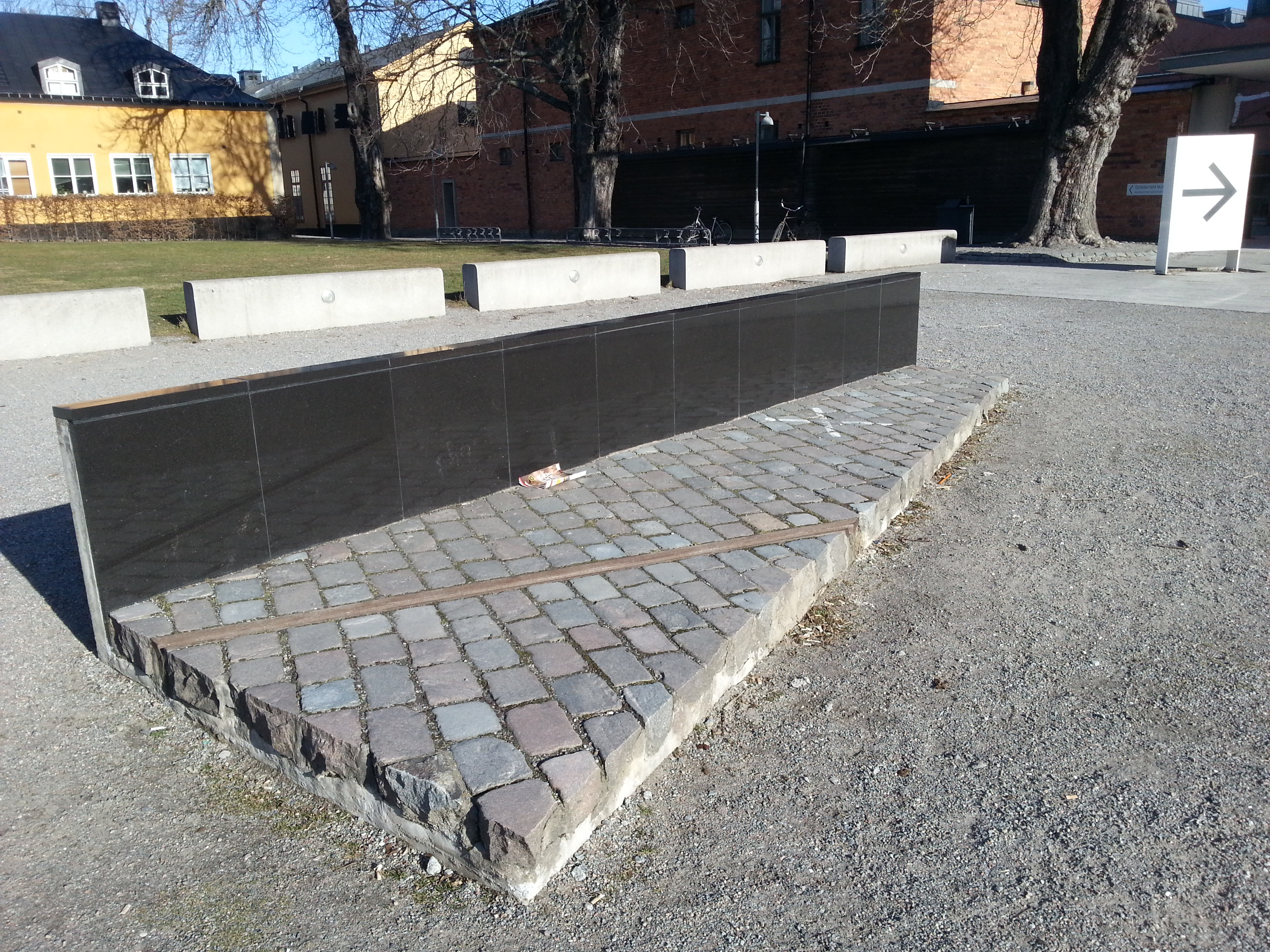
- Born: December 17, 1937; Falun, Sweden
- Died: March 6, 2009 (aged 71); Avesta, Sweden
- Notable work: Lenin Monument 1917

Björn Lövin (17 December 1937 – 6 March 2009) was a Swedish painter, sculptor and installation artist. During his lifetime he had solo exhibitions at Moderna Museet, Göteborgs Konsthall, Liljevalchs konsthall, Kulturhuset and in Paris at the Centre Pompidou.

One of Lövin's most significant work is Lenin Monument April 13th 1917, an outdoor anti-monument that can be viewed outside Moderna Museet in Stockholm.

Björn Lövin was the father of politician and former Deputy Prime Minister of Sweden, Isabella Lövin.
