= Woman Made Gallery =

Feminist art gallery

Coordinates: 41°53′39.1″N 87°39′6.5″W

The Woman Made Gallery (WMG) is a Chicago based non-profit gallery known for elevating women and non-binary artists through exhibitions, membership, and community dialogue programs. Woman Made's vision is to ensure the equal placement of women's art in the art world. WMG is Chicago's longest-operating feminist art gallery and one of the leading organizations promoting women's art in the US.

Founded in 1992, by Kelly Hensen and Beate Minkovski, Woman Made Gallery has hosted nearly 400 exhibitions and has exhibited more than 9,000 women artists.

The gallery has been associated with artists like Judy Chicago and Faith Ringgold.

== Development ==
Woman Made Gallery was originally housed in Ravenswood Manor on Chicago's Northside (4646 N Rockwell St), from 1992 until August 1997. WMG then moved to Prairie Avenue (1900 S. Prairie Ave), south of downtown Chicago from 1997–2003. This location was more centrally located and closer to more diverse neighborhoods of people. The new location also had more exhibition space and allowed WMG to display works form their Permanent Collection. In early 2003 WMG moved again to Humboldt Park (2418 W Bloomingdale Ave)), where they remained until November 2005. WMG moved to 685 N. Milwaukee Ave, nearby to Intuit: The Center for Intuitive and Outsider Art and the former location of ARC Gallery. This space is 3,000 square feet with two levels. In 2017, WMG moved to the Lacuna Lofts (2150 S. Canalport Ave, Suite 4A3). They are now located in the Pilsen-UIC neighborhood at 1332 S. Halsted Ave.

== Mission ==
The gallery's founder, Beate Minkovski, stated in an interview that the gallery's priority is to provide a platform for women artists' perspective. She added, “Woman Made fills a niche that is important, not just now, but also for the future,” states Minkovski. “It’s almost like saying, African American galleries: are they necessary or not? Will they ever not be necessary? When men say, ‘Why? It’s all the same? Why can’t I show my work?’ we used to say ‘You have the whole world where you can show.’”

== Logo ==
WMG's current logo was designed in 2012 by a team at Firebelly University. The logo, an intertwined "W" and "M" symbolizes how women in the arts support one another.
