= Axel Malmström =

Swedish photographer (1872–1945)

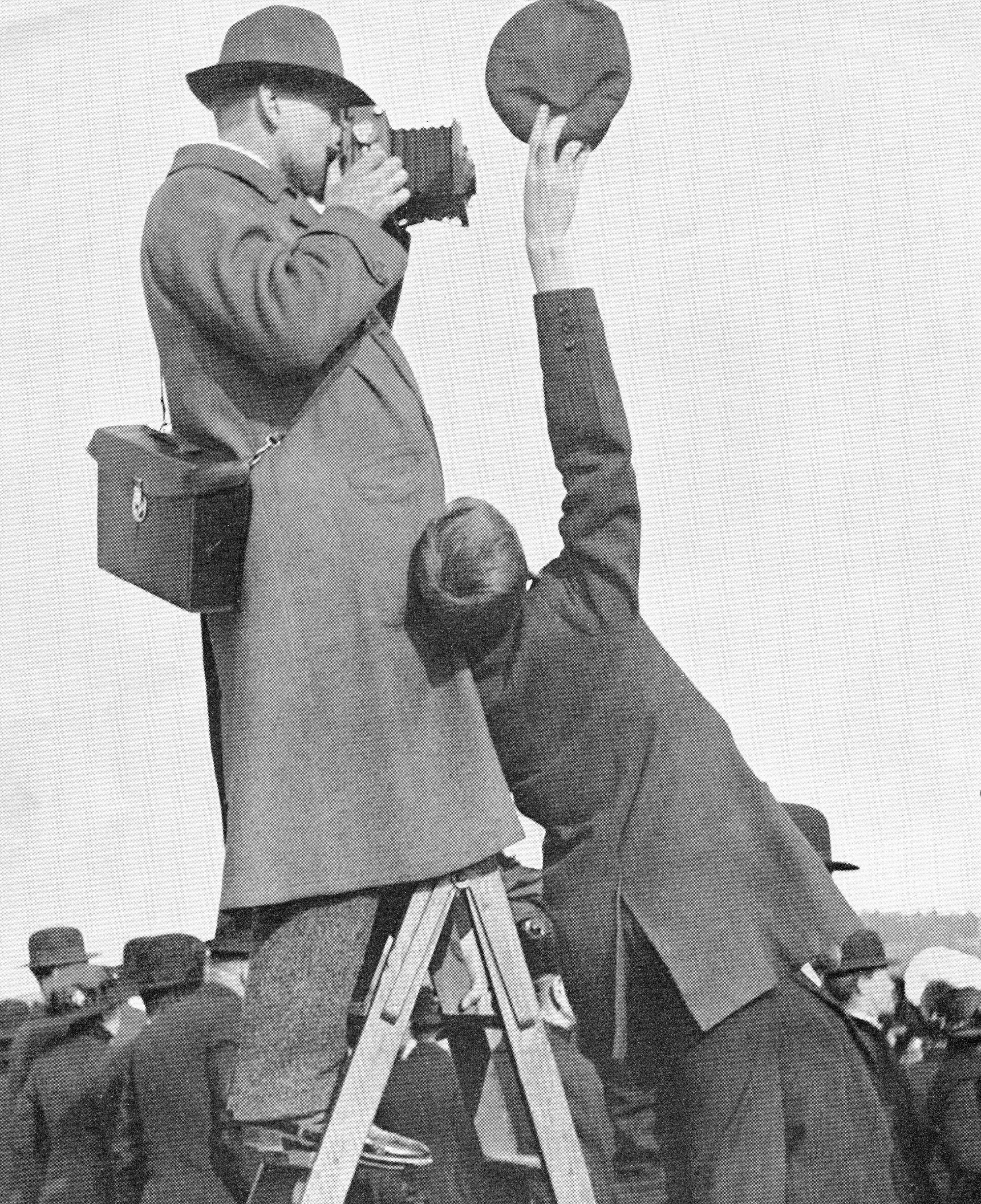
- Axel Malmström in 1915 at Gärdet, Stockholm, Sweden
- Born: January 13, 1872; Linköping, Sweden
- Died: July 7, 1945 (aged 73); Nacka, Sweden

Axel Valentin Malmström (13 January 1872 – 7 July 1945) was a Swedish photographer known for his pioneering photojournalistic work in Stockholm during the first third of the 20th century. Besides daily life, social protests, fires and accidents, Malmström also documented major official events such as the 1912 Summer Olympics and the 1930 funeral of the members of the Andrée Expedition.

== Biography ==
A young typographer in his native Linköping, Malmström moved to Stockholm in 1894. Initially, photography was his hobby. In 1902 he opened a small studio and became a full-time photographer, specializing in portraits and photojournalism. His pictures were mainly published by Stockholm newspapers Dagens Nyheter and Social-Demokraten as well as in the weekly magazine Hvar 8 Dag. His photographs are, according to Per Anders Fogelström, crucial to fully understand the history of Stockholm. 11,000 of Malmström's negatives are in the collection of Stockholm City Museum.

== Gallery ==
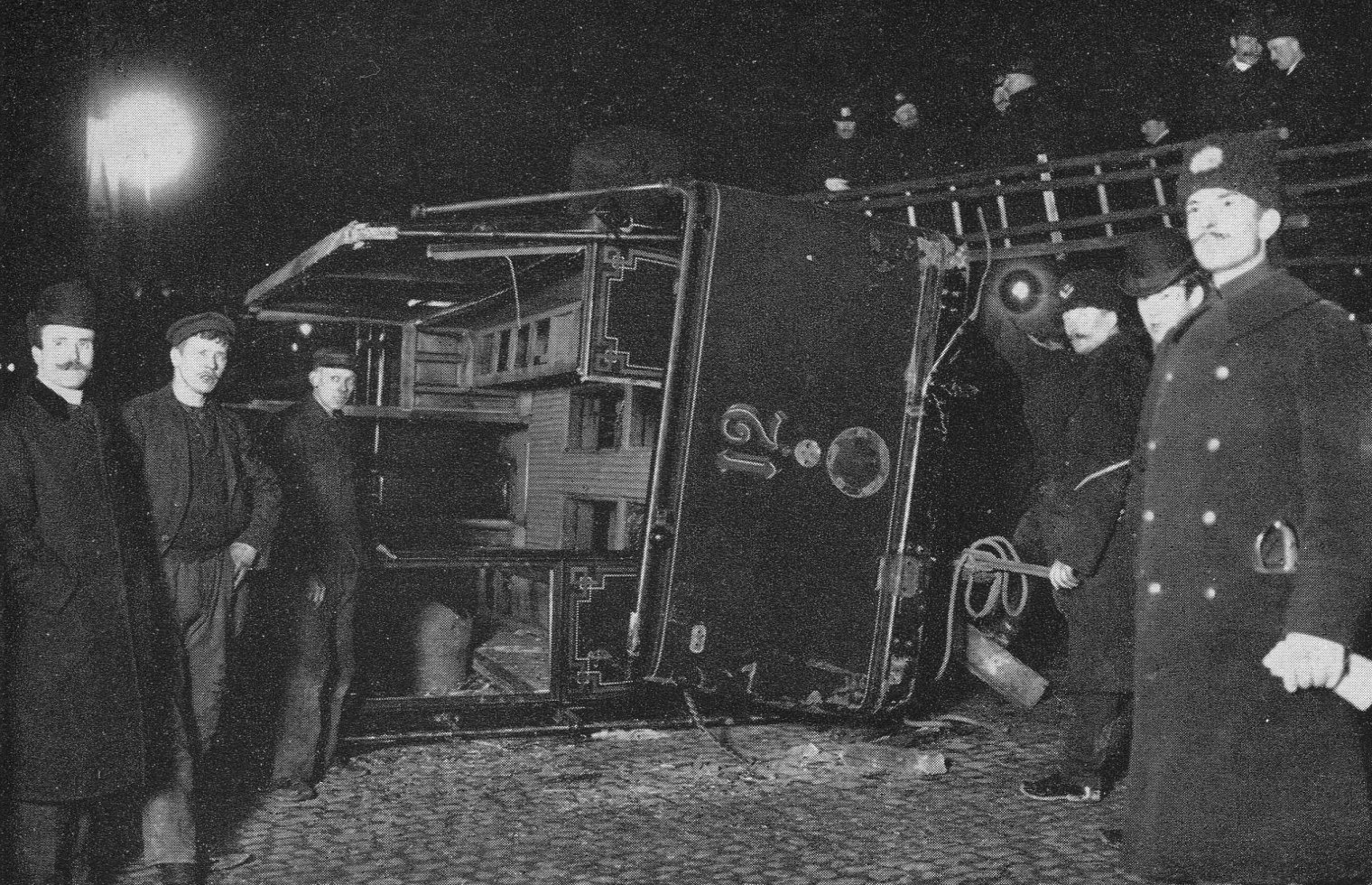
Derailed tram, Slussen, 1905.

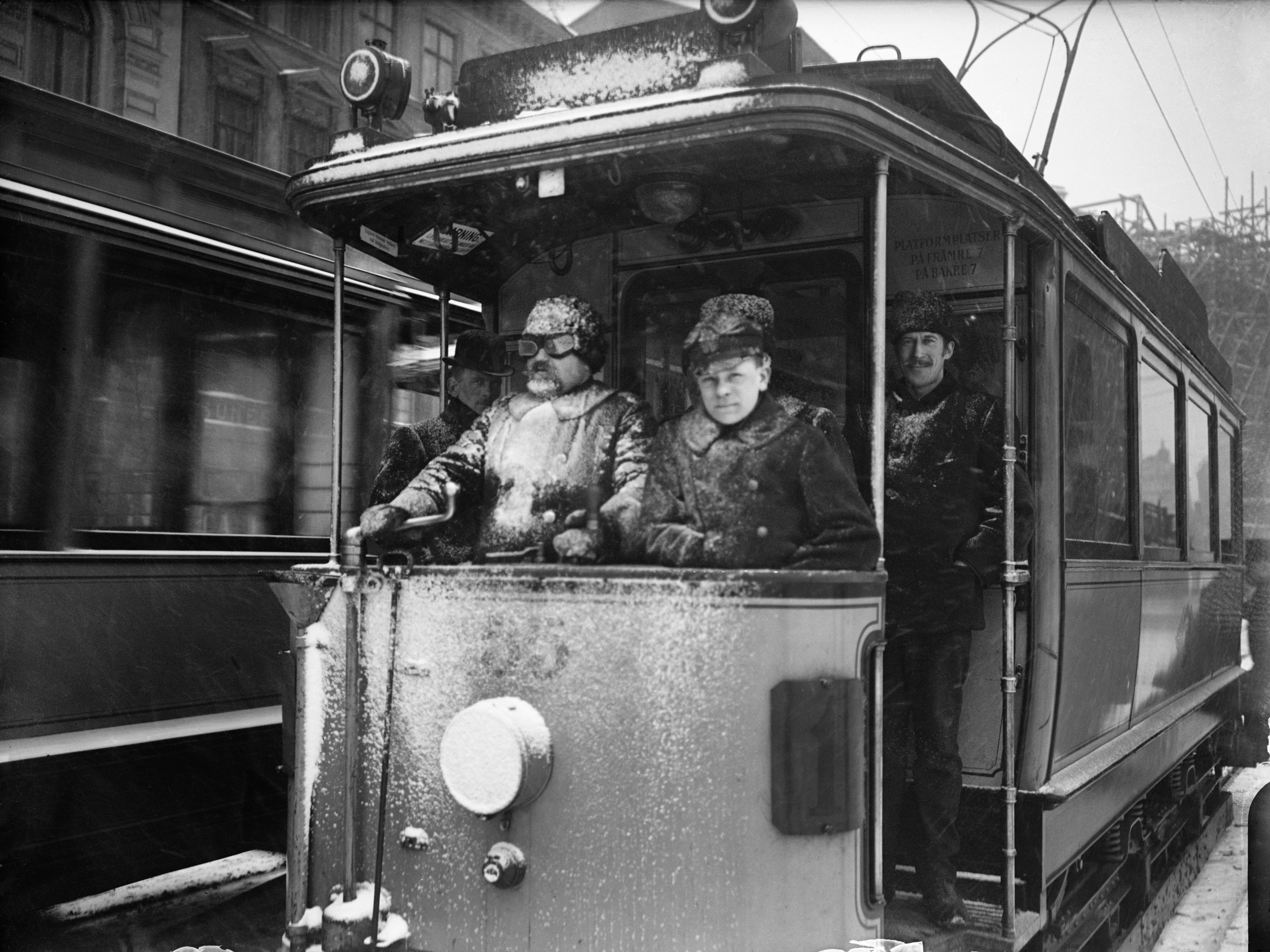
Stockholm tram, winter 1908.

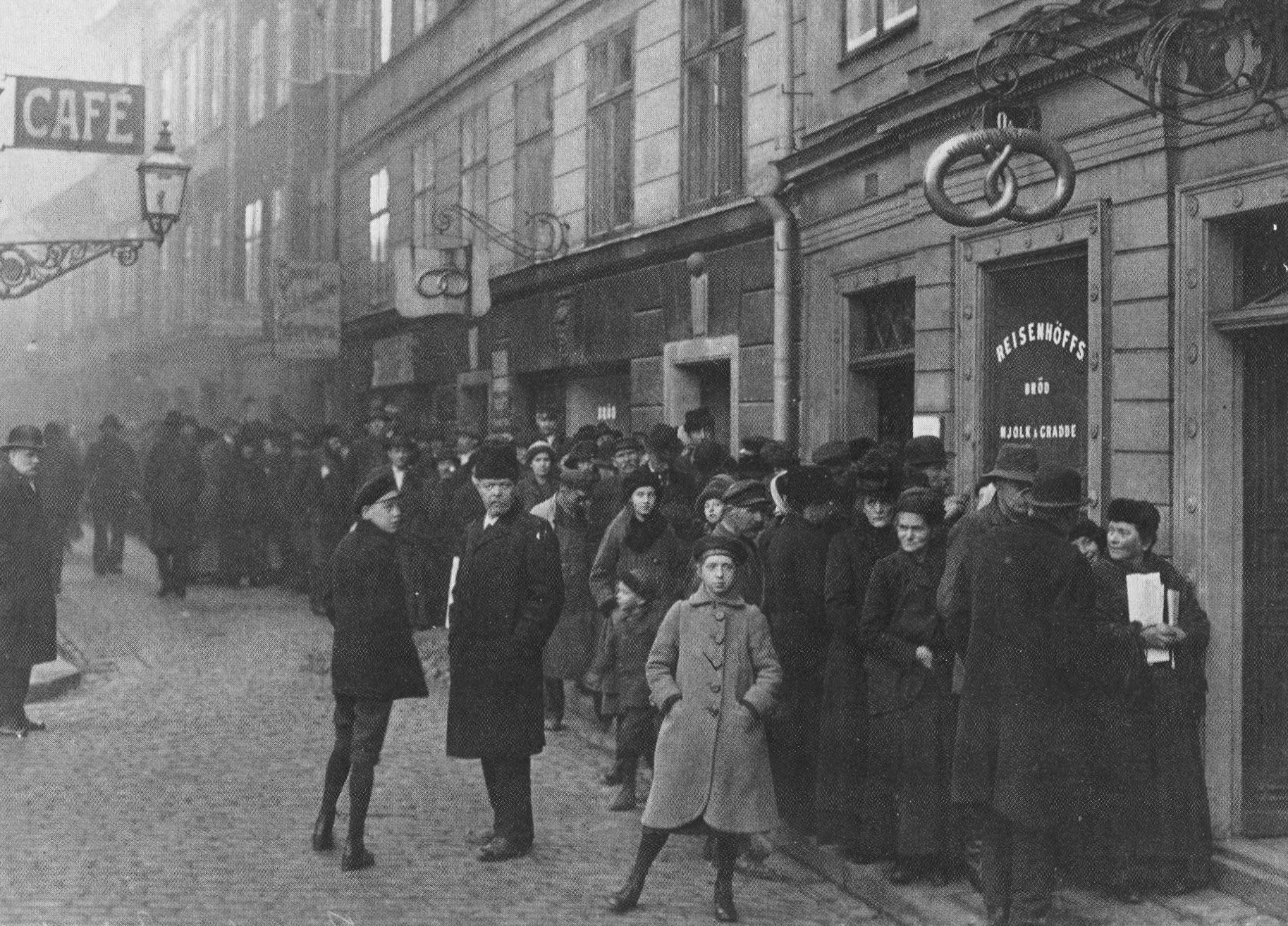
Bread line, Stortorget, 1917.

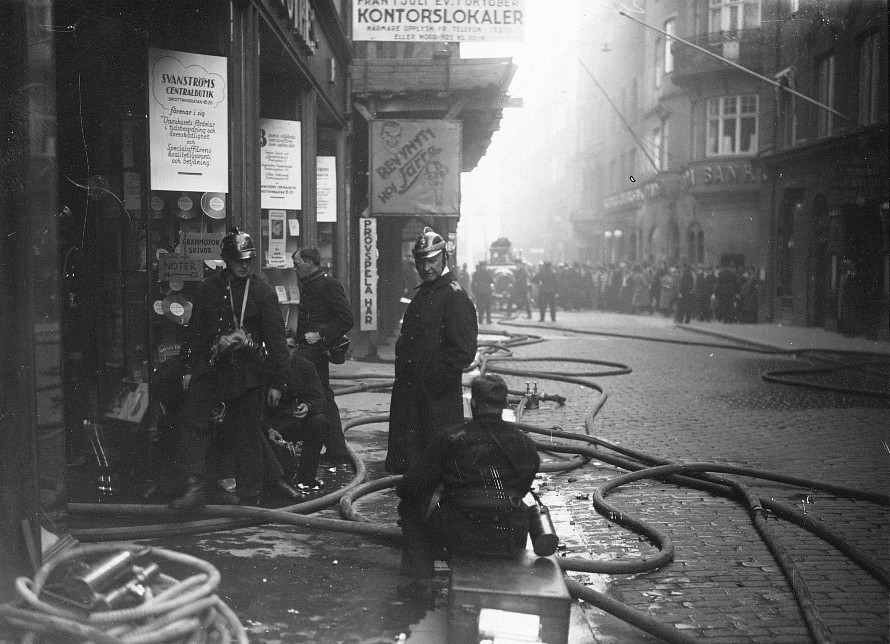
House fire, Herkulesgatan, 1929.
